= Code page 915 =

Computer character set for Eastern European languages

Code page 915 (CCSID 915) (also known as CP 915, IBM 00915) is a code page used under IBM AIX and DOS to write the Bulgarian, Belarusian, Russian, Serbian and Macedonian languages, but was never widely used. It would also have been usable for Ukrainian in the Soviet Union from 1933 to 1990, but it is missing the Ukrainian letter ge, ґ, which is required in Ukrainian orthography before and since, and during that period outside Soviet Ukraine. As a result, IBM created Code page 1124. It is an extension of ISO/IEC 8859-5. Code page 915 matches ISO/IEC 8859-5 directly from 0xA0 through 0xFF.

== Code page layout ==
In the following table characters are shown together with their corresponding Unicode code points. Only the second half is shown, code points 0-127 are the same as code page 437.

Code Page 915
	0	1	2	3	4	5	6	7	8	9	A	B	C	D	E	F
8x	░	▒	▓	│	┤	┘	┌	█	©	╣	║	╗	╝	¢	¥	┐
9x	└	┴	┬	├	─	┼	▄	▀	╚	╔	╩	╦	╠	═	╬	¤
Ax	NBSP	Ё	Ђ	Ѓ	Є	Ѕ	І	Ї	Ј	Љ	Њ	Ћ	Ќ	SHY	Ў	Џ
Bx	А	Б	В	Г	Д	Е	Ж	З	И	Й	К	Л	М	Н	О	П
Cx	Р	С	Т	У	Ф	Х	Ц	Ч	Ш	Щ	Ъ	Ы	Ь	Э	Ю	Я
Dx	а	б	в	г	д	е	ж	з	и	й	к	л	м	н	о	п
Ex	р	с	т	у	ф	х	ц	ч	ш	щ	ъ	ы	ь	э	ю	я
Fx	№	ё	ђ	ѓ	є	ѕ	і	ї	ј	љ	њ	ћ	ќ	§	ў	џ
