= ISO-IR-153 =

Encoding for Cyrillic Alphabet

- Languages: Russian, Bulgarian
- Standard: ST SEV 358-88, GOST R 34.303-92 (see below)
- Classification: Extended ASCII
- Based on: Main code page
- Extensions: ISO-8859-5, IBM-1124, ISO-IR-200, ISO-IR-201
- Preceded by: KOI8-B

ISO-IR-153 (ST SEV 358-88) is an 8-bit character set that covers the Russian and Bulgarian alphabets. Unlike the KOI encodings, this encoding lists the Cyrillic letters in their correct traditional order. This has become the basis for ISO/IEC 8859-5 and the Cyrillic Unicode block.

== Standards and Naming ==
The name ISO-IR-153 refers to this set's number in the ISO-IR registry, and marks it as a set which may be used within ISO/IEC 2022.

ISO-IR-153 is a subset of ISO/IEC 8859-5 (synchronised with ECMA-113 since 1988). The ISO-IR-153 documentation cites ST SEV 358-88 as the source standard. While it also cites the earlier GOST 19768-74 (which defines KOI-8 and was conformed to by the first version of ECMA-113, i.e. ISO-IR-111), it does not follow the KOI-8 layout (rather using a close modification of the letter layout from the Main code page) so this appears to be in error. The ISO-IR-153 encoding was intended to replace GOST 19768-74, and is sometimes referred to as GOST-19768-87. This confusion has led to a common misconception that ISO-8859-5 was defined in or based on GOST 19768-74.

Notwithstanding the extents of their accuracy, the IANA lists GOST_19768-74, ST_SEV_358-88 and iso-ir-153 as labels which may be used for the ISO-IR-153 encoding on the Internet, with reference to RFC 1345, which assigns it those labels.

GOST R 34.303-92 includes the ISO-IR-153 code page and dubs it KOI-8 V1 (in addition to using KOI-8 N1 and KOI-8 N2 for two Alternative code page/Code page 866 variants).

== Character set ==
The following table shows the ISO-IR-153 encoding. Each character is shown with its equivalent Unicode code point.

The encoding closely resembles the letter subset of the Cyrillic part of the Main code page, apart from the relocation of the uppercase Ё from 0xF0 to 0xA1. ISO-8859-5 is a superset.

ISO-IR-153
	0	1	2	3	4	5	6	7	8	9	A	B	C	D	E	F
8x																
9x																
Ax	NBSP	Ё 0401												SHY		
Bx	А 0410	Б 0411	В 0412	Г 0413	Д 0414	Е 0415	Ж 0416	З 0417	И 0418	Й 0419	К 041A	Л 041B	М 041C	Н 041D	О 041E	П 041F
Cx	Р 0420	С 0421	Т 0422	У 0423	Ф 0424	Х 0425	Ц 0426	Ч 0427	Ш 0428	Щ 0429	Ъ 042A	Ы 042B	Ь 042C	Э 042D	Ю 042E	Я 042F
Dx	а 0430	б 0431	в 0432	г 0433	д 0434	е 0435	ж 0436	з 0437	и 0438	й 0439	к 043A	л 043B	м 043C	н 043D	о 043E	п 043F
Ex	р 0440	с 0441	т 0442	у 0443	ф 0444	х 0445	ц 0446	ч 0447	ш 0448	щ 0449	ъ 044A	ы 044B	ь 044C	э 044D	ю 044E	я 044F
Fx		ё 0451														

== See also ==
- ISO-IR-111
