= Code page 1124 =

Computer character set for Ukrainian

IBM-1124
- Language(s): Ukrainian and others
- Classification: Extended ASCII
- Extends: ISO-IR-153
- Based on: ISO-8859-5

Code page 1124 (CCSID 1124), also known as CP1124, is a modified version of ISO 8859-5 that was designed to cover the Ukrainian language. It is identical to ISO 8859-5 except for replacing the Macedonian characters Ѓ and ѓ with the Ukrainian Ґ and ґ.

== Code page layout ==
Differences from ISO 8859-5 have the equivalent Unicode code point below the character.

Code page 1124
	0	1	2	3	4	5	6	7	8	9	A	B	C	D	E	F
Ax	NBSP	Ё	Ђ	Ґ 0490	Є	Ѕ	І	Ї	Ј	Љ	Њ	Ћ	Ќ	SHY	Ў	Џ
Bx	А	Б	В	Г	Д	Е	Ж	З	И	Й	К	Л	М	Н	О	П
Cx	Р	С	Т	У	Ф	Х	Ц	Ч	Ш	Щ	Ъ	Ы	Ь	Э	Ю	Я
Dx	а	б	в	г	д	е	ж	з	и	й	к	л	м	н	о	п
Ex	р	с	т	у	ф	х	ц	ч	ш	щ	ъ	ы	ь	э	ю	я
Fx	№	ё	ђ	ґ 0491	є	ѕ	і	ї	ј	љ	њ	ћ	ќ	§	ў	џ
