= Main code page (Russian) =

The Main code page (Russian: Основная кодировка) is an 8-bit code page used in DOS. It was devised in 1986 by a research group at the Academy of Science of the USSR. The other code page by the same group is known as the "Alternative code page" (Russian: Альтернативная кодировка) which is nearly identical to code page 866. Unlike the latter, the "Main code page" does not preserve the code points of the pseudographic symbols of code page 437. However, the majority of software at that period were made to be compatible with code page 437, as a result the Main code page has never gained any wide use. With the introduction of the Russian version of MS-DOS in 1990 which by default uses code page 866, the Main code page has become obsolete. Neither IBM nor Microsoft have ever supported this code page, so it has not been given its code page number by any vendor.

The Main code page was hardwired in some Soviet IBM PC clones such as ES PEVM or Iskra-1030 (however, other Soviet computers such as UKNC generally used KOI-7 or KOI-8).

The cells B0–EF seem to be the origin for the same rows in ISO/IEC 8859-5.

Main code page
	0	1	2	3	4	5	6	7	8	9	A	B	C	D	E	F
0x	NUL	☺	☻	♥	♦	♣	♠	•	◘	○	◙	♂	♀	♪	♫	☼
1x	►	◄	↕	‼	¶	§	▬	↨	↑	↓	→	←	∟	↔	▲	▼
2x	SP	!	"	#	$	%	&	'	(	)	*	+	,	-	.	/
3x	0	1	2	3	4	5	6	7	8	9	:	;	<	=	>	?
4x	@	A	B	C	D	E	F	G	H	I	J	K	L	M	N	O
5x	P	Q	R	S	T	U	V	W	X	Y	Z	[	\	]		_
6x	`	a	b	c	d	e	f	g	h	i	j	k	l	m	n	o
7x	p	q	r	s	t	u	v	w	x	y	z	{	|	}	~	⌂
8x	╧	╨	╤	╡	╢	╖	╕	╥	╙	╘	╒	╜	╛	╞	╟	╓
9x	╔	╗	╝	╚	═	║	╦	╣	╩	╠	╬	░	▒	▓	╫	╪
Ax	┌	┐	┘	└	─	│	┬	┤	┴	├	┼	█	▄	▌	▐	▀
Bx	А	Б	В	Г	Д	Е	Ж	З	И	Й	К	Л	М	Н	О	П
Cx	Р	С	Т	У	Ф	Х	Ц	Ч	Ш	Щ	Ъ	Ы	Ь	Э	Ю	Я
Dx	а	б	в	г	д	е	ж	з	и	й	к	л	м	н	о	п
Ex	р	с	т	у	ф	х	ц	ч	ш	щ	ъ	ы	ь	э	ю	я
Fx	Ё	ё	╭	╮	╯	╰	→	←	↓	↑	÷	±	№	¤	■	NBSP
