= ISO/IEC 8859-5 =

ISO 8859 standard character encoding for Cyrillic

ISO-8859-5
- Alias(es): ISO-IR-144, Cyrillic, csISOLatinCyrillic
- Languages: Russian, Bulgarian, Belarusian, Macedonian, Serbian, Ukrainian (partial)
- Standard: ISO/IEC 8859-5, ECMA-113 (since 1988 edition)
- Classification: Extended ASCII, ISO 8859
- Extends: US-ASCII, ISO-IR-153
- Based on: Main code page
- Extensions: IBM-915
- Preceded by: ECMA-113:1986 (ISO-IR-111)
- Other related encoding: IBM-1124

ISO/IEC 8859-5:1999, Information technology — 8-bit single-byte coded graphic character sets — Part 5: Latin/Cyrillic alphabet, is part of the ISO/IEC 8859 series of ASCII-based standard character encodings, first edition published in 1988. It is informally referred to as Latin/Cyrillic.

It was designed to cover languages using a Cyrillic alphabet such as Bulgarian, Belarusian, Russian, Serbian and Macedonian but was never widely used. The 8-bit encodings KOI8-R and KOI8-U, IBM-866, and also Windows-1251 are far more commonly used. In contrast to the relationship between Windows-1252 and ISO 8859-1, Windows-1251 is not closely related to ISO 8859-5. However, the main Cyrillic block in Unicode uses a layout based on ISO-8859-5.

ISO 8859-5 would also have been usable for Ukrainian in the Soviet Union from 1933 to 1990, but it is missing the Ukrainian letter ge, ґ, which is required in Ukrainian orthography before and since, and during that period outside Soviet Ukraine. As a result, IBM created Code page 1124.

ISO-8859-5 is the IANA preferred charset name for this standard when supplemented with the C0 and C1 control codes from ISO/IEC 6429. The Windows code page for ISO-8859-5 is code page 28595 a.k.a. Windows-28595. IBM assigned code page 915 to ISO-8859-5 until that code page was extended.

== Code page layout ==
Differences from ISO 8859-1 are shown with its Unicode equivalent code point.

ISO/IEC 8859-5
	0	1	2	3	4	5	6	7	8	9	A	B	C	D	E	F
0x																
1x																
2x	SP	!	"	#	$	%	&	'	(	)	*	+	,	-	.	/
3x	0	1	2	3	4	5	6	7	8	9	:	;	<	=	>	?
4x	@	A	B	C	D	E	F	G	H	I	J	K	L	M	N	O
5x	P	Q	R	S	T	U	V	W	X	Y	Z	[	\	]		_
6x	`	a	b	c	d	e	f	g	h	i	j	k	l	m	n	o
7x	p	q	r	s	t	u	v	w	x	y	z	{	|	}	~	
8x																
9x																
Ax	NBSP	Ё 0401	Ђ 0402	Ѓ 0403	Є 0404	Ѕ 0405	І 0406	Ї 0407	Ј 0408	Љ 0409	Њ 040A	Ћ 040B	Ќ 040C	SHY	Ў 040E	Џ 040F
Bx	А 0410	Б 0411	В 0412	Г 0413	Д 0414	Е 0415	Ж 0416	З 0417	И 0418	Й 0419	К 041A	Л 041B	М 041C	Н 041D	О 041E	П 041F
Cx	Р 0420	С 0421	Т 0422	У 0423	Ф 0424	Х 0425	Ц 0426	Ч 0427	Ш 0428	Щ 0429	Ъ 042A	Ы 042B	Ь 042C	Э 042D	Ю 042E	Я 042F
Dx	а 0430	б 0431	в 0432	г 0433	д 0434	е 0435	ж 0436	з 0437	и 0438	й 0439	к 043A	л 043B	м 043C	н 043D	о 043E	п 043F
Ex	р 0440	с 0441	т 0442	у 0443	ф 0444	х 0445	ц 0446	ч 0447	ш 0448	щ 0449	ъ 044A	ы 044B	ь 044C	э 044D	ю 044E	я 044F
Fx	№ 2116	ё 0451	ђ 0452	ѓ 0453	є 0454	ѕ 0455	і 0456	ї 0457	ј 0458	љ 0459	њ 045A	ћ 045B	ќ 045C	§ 00A7	ў 045E	џ 045F

== History and related code pages ==
The ECMA-113 standard has been equivalent to ISO-8859-5 since its second edition, its first edition (ISO-IR-111) having been an extension of the earlier KOI-8 (defined by GOST 19768-74), which lays out the Russian letters in the same way as their ASCII Roman equivalents where possible. The initial draft of ISO-8859-5 (DIS-8859-5:1987) followed ISO-IR-111, but was revised after GOST 19768-74 was replaced by the new ISO-IR-153 in 1987, which re-arranged the Russian letters into alphabetical order (except for Ё). ISO-IR-153 contains the Russian letters, including Ё, and the non-breaking space and soft hyphen, whereas the full Cyrillic set of ISO-8859-5 is also called ISO-IR-144.

Possibly as a consequence of this confusion, RFC 1345 erroneously lists yet another code page as "ISO-IR-111", combining the letter order and case order of ISO-8859-5 with the row order of ISO-IR-111 (and consequently compatible with neither in practice, but in practice partially compatible with Windows-1251).

IBM Code page 915 is an extension of ISO/IEC 8859-5, adding some semigraphic and other symbols in the C1 area. IBM Code page 1124 is mostly identical to ISO-8859-5, but replaces ѓ with ґ for Ukrainian use.

ISO-IR-200, "Uralic Supplementary Cyrillic Set", was registered in 1998 by Everson Gunn Teoranta (which Michael Everson was a director of, prior to the founding of Evertype in 2001), and changes several of the non-Russian letters in order to support the Kildin Sami, Komi and Nenets languages, not supported by ISO-8859-5 itself. Michael Everson also introduced Mac OS Barents Cyrillic for the same languages on classic Mac OS. FreeDOS calls it code page 59283.

ISO-IR 200 (differences from ISO-8859-5)
	0	1	2	3	4	5	6	7	8	9	A	B	C	D	E	F
Ax	NBSP	Ё	Ӈ 04C7	Ӓ 04D2	Ӭ 04EC	Ҍ 048C	І	Ӧ 04E6	Ҋ 048A	Ӆ 04C5	Ӊ 04C9	« 00AB	Ӎ 04CD	SHY	Ҏ 048E	ʼ 02BC
Fx	№	ё	ӈ 04C8	ӓ 04D3	ӭ 04ED	ҍ 048D	і	ӧ 04E7	ҋ 048B	ӆ 04C6	ӊ 04CA	» 00BB	ӎ 04CE	§	ҏ 048F	ˮ 02EE

ISO-IR-201, "Volgaic Supplementary Cyrillic Set", was similarly introduced by Everson Gunn Teoranta in order to support the Chuvash, Komi, Mari and Udmurt languages, spoken in the titular republics of Russia. FreeDOS calls it code page 58259.

ISO-IR 201 (differences from ISO-8859-5)
	0	1	2	3	4	5	6	7	8	9	A	B	C	D	E	F
Ax	NBSP	Ё	Ӑ 04D0	Ӓ 04D2	Ӗ 04D6	Ҫ 04AA	І	Ӧ 04E6	Ӥ 04E4	Ӝ 04DC	Ҥ 04A4	Ӹ 04F8	Ӟ 04DE	SHY	Ӱ 04F0	Ӵ 04F4
Fx	№	ё	ӑ 04D1	ӓ 04D3	ӗ 04D7	ҫ 04AB	і	ӧ 04E7	ӥ 04E5	ӝ 04DD	ҥ 04A5	ӹ 04F9	ӟ 04DF	§	ӱ 04F1	ӵ 04F5
