= Ukrainian I =

Ukrainian I may refer to:

- Dotted I
- Yi (letter)
