= Semisoft sign =

Cyrillic letter used in Kildin Sami

- Ҍ ҍ

Usage
- Writing system: Cyrillic
- Type: Alphabetic
- Language of origin: Kildin Sámi language
- Sound values: /ʲ/

The semisoft sign (Ҍ ҍ; italics: Ҍ ҍ) is a letter of the Cyrillic script.

The semisoft sign is used in the alphabet of the Kildin Sami language, where it indicates palatalization (sometimes also called "half-palatalization") of the preceding stop, /nʲ/, /tʲ/, or /dʲ/.

It has a similar shape to the yat (ѣ) but the horizontal stroke across the upright is shorter.

== Computing codes ==
Character information
Preview	Ҍ		ҍ	
Unicode name	CYRILLIC CAPITAL LETTER; SEMISOFT SIGN		CYRILLIC SMALL LETTER; SEMISOFT SIGN	
Encodings	decimal	hex	dec	hex
Unicode	1164	U+048C	1165	U+048D
UTF-8	210 140	D2 8C	210 141	D2 8D
Numeric character reference	&#1164;	&#x48C;	&#1165;	&#x48D;

== See also ==
- Ѣ ѣ : Cyrillic letter Yat
- Cyrillic characters in Unicode
