= Lje =

Cyrillic letter representing /ʎ/ in Macedonian, Serbian, and other languages

- Љ љ

Usage
- Writing system: Cyrillic
- Type: Alphabetic
- Language of origin: Macedonian, Bosnian, Montenegrin, Serbian Itelmen
- Sound values: [ʎ], [ɫ]

History
- Development: ЛЬ ль: Љ љ
- Transliterations: Ll ll

Lje, or Lle (Љ љ; italics: Љ љ; also called lye) is a letter of the Cyrillic script.

The letter Lje in serif and italic styles

Lje represents a palatal lateral /ʎ/, a sound similar (but not identical) to the palatalized alveolar lateral approximant /lʲ/, which is in some languages represented by the digraph ⟨ль⟩ and pronounced /lʲ/ like the ⟨ll⟩ in "million". Compare Latvian ⟨ļ⟩, Slovak ⟨ľ⟩, Hungarian ⟨ly⟩, Portuguese ⟨lh⟩, Spanish ⟨ll⟩ and Italian ⟨gl⟩.

Lje is a ligature of ⟨л⟩ and ⟨ь⟩. It was invented by Vuk Stefanović Karadžić for use in his 1818 dictionary, replacing the earlier digraph ⟨ль⟩. It corresponds to the digraph ⟨ǈ⟩ in Gaj's Latin alphabet for Serbo-Croatian.

It is today used in Macedonian, variants of Serbo-Croatian when written in Cyrillic (Bosnian, Montenegrin and Serbian), and Itelmen.

It was also once used in the Udege language, in the Lithuanian Cyrillic alphabet, and in the Albanian Cyrillic alphabet.

Lje is commonly transliterated as lj but can also be transliterated as ľ, or ļ.

== Related letters and other similar characters ==
- Л л : Cyrillic letter El
- Ь ь : Cyrillic letter Soft sign
- Ll : Spanish double L in the absence of Yeísmo
- Ľ ľ : Latin letter L with caron - a Slovak letter
- Ĺ ĺ : Latin letter L with acute - another Slovak letter
- Ļ ļ : Latin letter L with cedilla - a Latvian letter
- Ly : Hungarian ly
- Њ њ : Cyrillic letter Nje
- Ǉ ǈ ǉ : Compatibility Unicode characters
- Ԉ ԉ : Komi Lje - corresponding character formerly used in Komi

== Computing codes ==
Character information
Preview	Љ		љ	
Unicode name	CYRILLIC CAPITAL LETTER LJE		CYRILLIC SMALL LETTER LJE	
Encodings	decimal	hex	dec	hex
Unicode	1033	U+0409	1113	U+0459
UTF-8	208 137	D0 89	209 153	D1 99
Numeric character reference	&#1033;	&#x409;	&#1113;	&#x459;
Named character reference	&LJcy;		&ljcy;	
Code page 855	145	91	144	90
Windows-1251	138	8A	154	9A
ISO-8859-5	169	A9	249	F9
Macintosh Cyrillic	188	BC	189	BD
