= Yi (Cyrillic) =

Cyrillic letter

- Ї ї

Usage
- Writing system: Cyrillic
- Type: Alphabetic
- Sound values: [ji]

History
- Development: Ι ι: Ϊ ϊ; Ї ї
- Sisters: Ï ï

Other
- Associated numbers: 10 (Cyrillic numerals)

Yi or Ji (Ї ї; italics: Ї ї) is a letter of the Cyrillic script. Yi is derived from the Greek letter iota with two dots.

It was the initial variant of the Cyrillic letter І/і, which saw change from two dots to one in the 18th century, possibly inspired by similar Latin letter i. Later two variants of the letter separated to become distinct letters in the Ukrainian alphabet.

It is used in the Ukrainian alphabet, the Pannonian Rusyn alphabet, and the Prešov Rusyn alphabet of Slovakia, where it represents the iotated vowel sound /ji/, like the pronunciation of ⟨yea⟩ in "yeast". As the historical variant of the Cyrillic Іі, it represented either /i/ (as i in pizza) or /j/ (as y in yen).

In various romanization systems of Ukrainian, ї is represented by Latin letters i or yi (word-initially), yi, ji, or even simply ï.

It was formerly also used in the Serbian Cyrillic alphabet in the late 18th and early 19th century, where it represented the sound /j/; in this capacity, it was introduced by Dositej Obradović but was eventually replaced with the modern letter ј by Vuk Stefanović Karadžić.

In Ukrainian, the letter was introduced as part of the Zhelekhivka orthography, in Yevhen Zhelekhivsky's Ukrainian–German dictionary (2 volumes, 1885–86).

== Russo-Ukrainian war ==
As the letter Ї appears in Ukrainian but not Russian Cyrillic, it has become a symbol of Ukrainian resistance in Russian-occupied Ukraine during the Russo-Ukrainian war. Residents of occupied cities and regions such as Mariupol, Melitopol, Sevastopol, and Kherson (before its liberation) have written the letter in chalk in public places or displayed it on paper.

== Related letters and other similar characters ==
- Ӥ ӥ : Cyrillic letter I with diaeresis
- Ï ï : Latin letter I with diaeresis
- Ι ι : Greek letter Ι
- Ј ј : Cyrillic letter J

== Computing codes ==
Character information
Preview	Ї		ї	
Unicode name	CYRILLIC CAPITAL LETTER YI		CYRILLIC SMALL LETTER YI	
Encodings	decimal	hex	dec	hex
Unicode	1031	U+0407	1111	U+0457
UTF-8	208 135	D0 87	209 151	D1 97
Numeric character reference	&#1031;	&#x407;	&#1111;	&#x457;
Named character reference	&YIcy;		&yicy;	
KOI8-U	183	B7	167	A7
Code page 855	141	8D	140	8C
Code page 866	244	F4	245	F5
Windows-1251	175	AF	191	BF
ISO-8859-5	167	A7	247	F7
Macintosh Cyrillic	186	BA	187	BB
