= Tse (Cyrillic) =

Cyrillic letter

Tse (ци)
- Ц ц
- Ꙡ ꙡ

Usage
- Writing system: Cyrillic
- Type: Alphabetic
- Language of origin: Old Church Slavonic
- Sound values: [t͡s]
- In Unicode: U+0426, U+0446, U+A660, U+A661

History
- Development: Ⱌ: Ц ц
- Transliterations: Ts ts, C c
- Variations: Ꙡ ꙡ

Other
- Associated numbers: 900 (Cyrillic numerals)

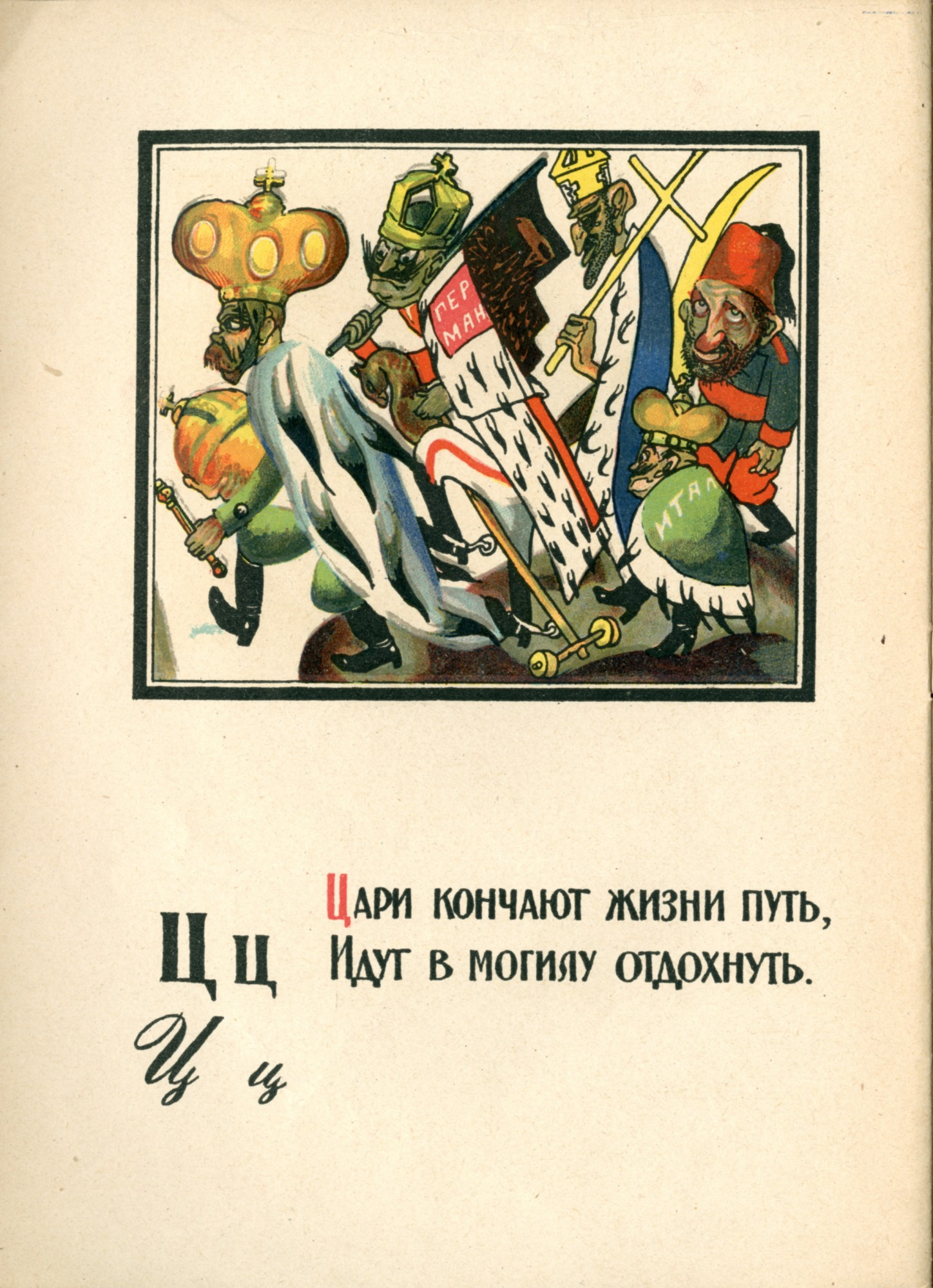
Tse, from the Alphabet Book оf the Red Army Soldier (1921)

Tse (Ц ц; italics: Ц ц or Ц ц; italics: Ц ц), also known as Ce, is a letter of the Cyrillic script.

It commonly represents the voiceless alveolar affricate /t͡s/, similar but not identical to the pronunciation of zz in "pizza" or ts in "cats".

In the standard Iron dialect of Ossetic, it represents the voiceless alveolar sibilant fricative /s/. In other dialects, including Digoron, it has the same value as in Russian.

Tse in the Bad Script font

In English, Tse is commonly romanized as ⟨ts⟩. However, in proper names (personal names, toponyms, etc.) and titles, it may also be rendered as ⟨c⟩ (which signifies the sound in Serbo-Croatian, Czech, Polish, Hungarian etc.), ⟨z⟩ (which signifies the sound in Italian and German), ⟨cz⟩ (which was one of the conventions to represent the sound in Medieval Latin) or ⟨tz⟩. Its equivalent in the modern Romanian Latin alphabet is ⟨ț⟩.

== History ==
Tse is thought to have come from the Hebrew letter Tsadi ⟨צ⟩ or the Arabic letter ص, via the Glagolitic letter Tsi (Ⱌ ⱌ). It is unclear what Egyptian hieroglyph originated the letter Tse, possibly derived from an image of a fish hook or a papyrus plant.

The name of Tse in the Early Cyrillic alphabet is ци (tsi). New Church Slavonic and Russian (archaic name) spelling of the name is ⟨цы⟩. In modern Russian, Ukrainian, and Belarusian, the name of the letter is pronounced [tsɛ] and spelled ⟨цэ⟩ (sometimes ⟨це⟩) in Russian, ⟨це⟩ in Ukrainian, and ⟨цэ⟩ in Belarusian.

In the Cyrillic numeral system, Tse has a value of 900. Tse may also have been derived from Sampi (based on numerical relationship) or Fai (based on shape and numerical relationship).

== Usage ==
=== Russian ===
It is the 24th (if Yo is included) letter of the Russian alphabet. It is used both in native Slavic words (and corresponds to Proto-Indo-European *k in certain positions) and in borrowed words:

- as a match for the Latin ⟨c⟩ in words of Latin origin, such as цирк (circus), центр (centre),
- for the German ⟨z⟩ and ⟨tz⟩ (which in turn both came from the High German consonant shift), in words borrowed from German, such as цинк (Zink), плац (Platz),
- ⟨ци⟩ may correspond to Latin ⟨ti⟩ (before vowels), such as сцинтилляция (scintillation).

Unlike most other consonants (but like ⟨ж⟩ and ⟨ш⟩), ⟨ц⟩ never represents a palatalised consonant in Russian (except occasionally in foreign proper names with ⟨ця⟩ or ⟨цю⟩). Since /i/ after unpalatalised consonants becomes [ɨ], the combinations ⟨ци⟩ and ⟨цы⟩ are pronounced identically: [tsɨ]. A notable rule of Russian orthography is that ⟨ц⟩ is rarely followed by ⟨ы⟩, with the following exceptions:

- the ending -⟨ы⟩ of the plural number or the genitive case (птица nominative singular → птицы nominative plural or genitive singular),
- possessive suffix -⟨ин⟩ is spelled -⟨ын⟩ after ⟨ц⟩ and only then: троицын, курицын,
  - the suffix is very popular in Russian last names, but spelling varies and both -⟨цын⟩ and -⟨цин⟩ are possible, Ельцин is an example,
- the ending of adjectives -⟨ый⟩ (that becomes -⟨ые⟩, -⟨ым⟩, -⟨ыми⟩, -⟨ых⟩ in declension) such as куцый or бледнолицый,
- conjugation of a vulgar verb сцать (сцы, сцым, сцыт, сцыте, сцышь) and its prefixed derivatives,
- a few other word roots: цыган, цык- (цыкать, цыкнуть), цып- (цыплёнок, цыпки, цыпочки, цып-цып), цыц, цыркать,
  - pre-1956 lists contain words such as цыбик, цыбуля, цыгарка, цыдулка, цыкля, цымбалы, цымес, цынга, цыновка, цынубель, цырюльня, цытварный, цыфирь, панцырь, etc. (examples taken from Ya. S. Khomutov's spelling dictionary, 1927 but now all those words are spelled with -ци-),
- Pinyin's ⟨ci⟩ becomes ⟨цы⟩, and ⟨qi⟩ becomes ⟨ци⟩.

== Related letters and other similar characters ==
- Reversed Tse (Ꙡ ꙡ)
- Tse with long left leg was used in Old Uslar's Caucasian Alphabets as is derived from Cyrillic letter Tse (Ц ц), with a longer left leg.
- צ : Hebrew letter Tsadi
- C c : Latin letter C
- С с : Cyrillic letter С
- Ț ț : Latin letter T with comma below, used in Romanian to represent the [ts] sound
- Ţ ţ : Latin letter T with cedilla, used in Gagauz to represent that very sound
- Ŧ ŧ : Latin letter T with stroke
- Ts ts ʦ: Digraph Ts
- Z z: Latin letter Z - same sound in German and Italian

== Computing codes ==
Character information
| Preview | Ц | | ц | |
|---|---|---|---|---|
| Unicode name | CYRILLIC CAPITAL LETTER TSE | | CYRILLIC SMALL LETTER TSE | |
| Encodings | decimal | hex | dec | hex |
| Unicode | 1062 | U+0426 | 1094 | U+0446 |
| UTF-8 | 208 166 | D0 A6 | 209 134 | D1 86 |
| Numeric character reference | &#1062; | &#x426; | &#1094; | &#x446; |
| Named character reference | &TScy; | | &tscy; | |
| KOI8-R and KOI8-U | 227 | E3 | 195 | C3 |
| Code page 855 | 165 | A5 | 164 | A4 |
| Code page 866 | 150 | 96 | 230 | E6 |
| Windows-1251 | 214 | D6 | 246 | F6 |
| ISO-8859-5 | 198 | C6 | 230 | E6 |
| Macintosh Cyrillic | 150 | 96 | 246 | F6 |
