= Yery =

Cyrillic letter

- Ы ы
- Ꙑ ꙑ

Usage
- Writing system: Cyrillic
- Type: Alphabetic
- Language of origin: Old Church Slavonic
- Sound values: [ɨ]; [ɯ]; [ə]; [ɤ]
- In Unicode: U+042B, U+044B, U+A650, U+A651

History
- Development: ⰟⰊ: Ы ы
- Transliterations: Y y
- Variations: Ꙑ ꙑ

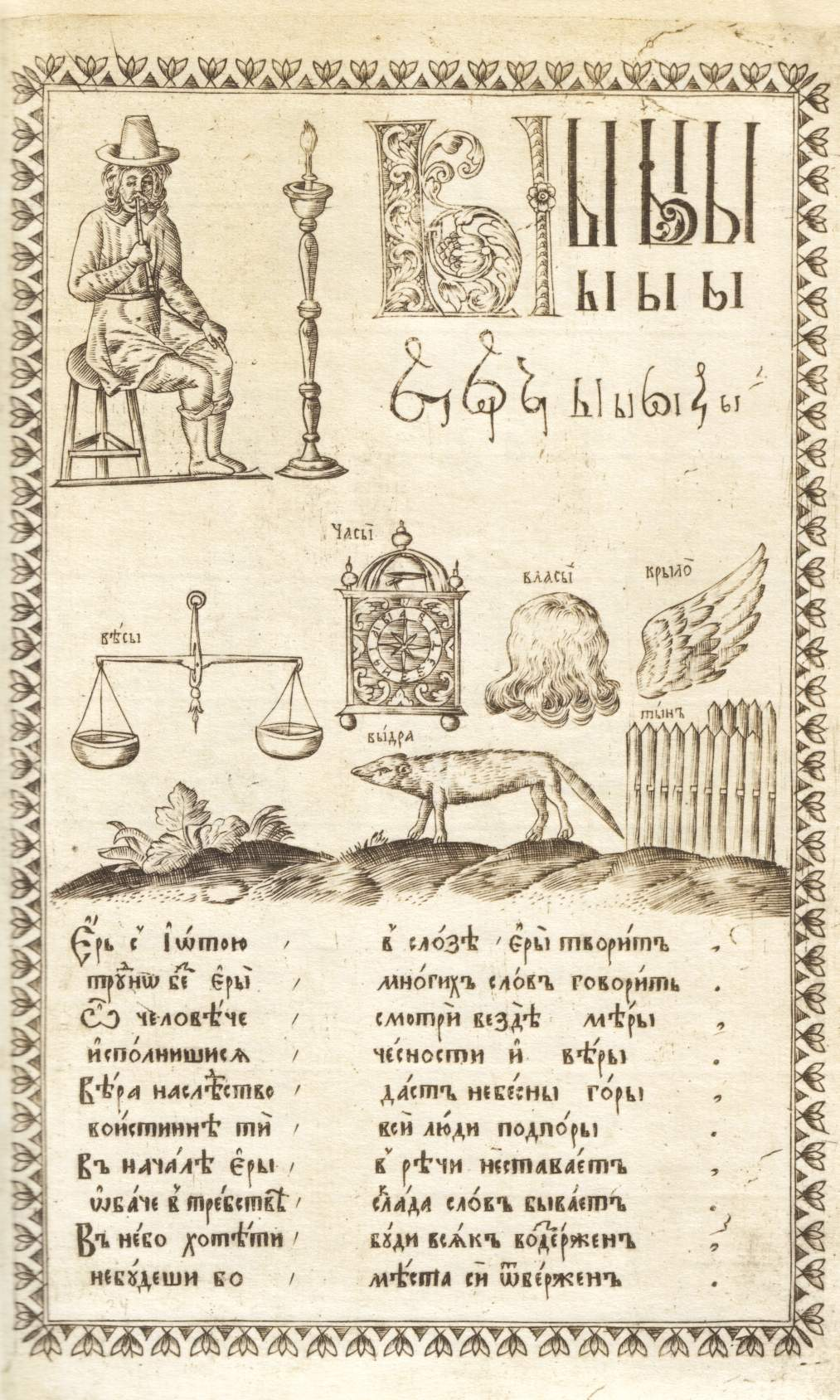
Yery, from Karion Istomin's 1694 alphabet book

Yeru or Eru (Ы ы; italics: Ы ы or Ы ы; italics: Ы ы), usually called Y [ɨ] in modern Russian or Yery or Ery historically and in modern Church Slavonic, is a letter in the Cyrillic script. It represents the close central unrounded vowel /ɨ/ (more rear or upper than i) after non-palatalised (hard) consonants in the Belarusian and Russian alphabets.

The letter is usually romanised ⟨y⟩, such that the family name Крылов is usually written Krylov in English and most other West European languages. That spelling matches the Latin alphabet used for Polish, whose letter ⟨y⟩ represents the same sound. Similarly, ⟨ы⟩ is used for ⟨y⟩ in the cyrillisation of Polish, such that the name Maryla appears as Марыля in Russian. Note, however, that the letter ⟨y⟩ also appears in romanisation of other Russian letters both in isolation (such as ⟨й⟩, y) and as part of digraphs (such as ⟨я⟩, ya).

In Rusyn, ⟨ы⟩ represents the close-mid back unrounded vowel /ɤ/. In most Turkic languages that use Cyrillic, such as Kazakh and Kyrgyz, ⟨ы⟩ is used to represent the close back unrounded vowel /ɯ/ instead.

== Origin ==
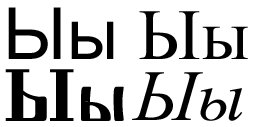
The letter Yery in several fonts

Cursive Yery

Like many other Cyrillic letters, it was originally from a ligature ꙑ (which is represented in Unicode as Yeru with Back Yer), formed from Yer ⟨ъ⟩ and Dotted I ⟨і⟩ (formerly written either dotless or with two dots) or Izhe (⟨и⟩ which formerly resembled ⟨н⟩). In Medieval manuscripts, it is almost always found as ⟨ъі⟩ or ⟨ъи⟩. The modern form ⟨ы⟩ first occurred in South Slavic manuscripts following the loss of palatalization of word-final and preconsonantal consonants, so the letters ⟨ъ⟩ and ⟨ь⟩ became confused; since the end of the 14th century, ⟨ы⟩ came to be used in East Slavic manuscripts.

== Usage ==
While vowel letters in the Cyrillic alphabet may be divided into iotated and non-iotated pairs (for example, ⟨о⟩ and ⟨ё⟩ both represent /o/, the latter denoting a preceding palatalised consonant), ⟨ы⟩ is more complicated. It appears only after hard consonants, its phonetic value differs from ⟨и⟩, and there is some scholarly disagreement as to whether or not ⟨ы⟩ and ⟨и⟩ denote different phonemes. This confusion may stem from the fact that the phonetic value of ⟨ы⟩ is sometimes attached to ⟨и⟩, particularly after certain hard consonants. Examples include words such as шить or жизнь - despite being written with ⟨и⟩, they are pronounced as if ⟨ы⟩ had been written.

=== In Russian ===
There are no native Russian words that begin with ⟨ы⟩ (except for the specific verb ыкать: "to say the ⟨ы⟩-sound"), but there are many proper and common nouns of non-Russian origin (including some geographical names in Russia) that begin with it: Kim Jong-un (Ким Чен Ын) and Ŭlchi Mundŏk (Ыльчи Мундок), a Korean military leader; and Ytyk-Kyuyol (Ытык-Кюёль), Ygyatta (Ыгыатта), a village and a river in Sakha (Yakutia) Republic respectively.

=== In Ukrainian ===
In the Ukrainian alphabet, yery is not used since the language lacks the sound /ɨ/. In the Ukrainian alphabet, yery merged with [i] and was phased out in the second half of the 19th century. According to the Ukrainian academician Hryhoriy Pivtorak, the letter was replaced with so called "Cyrillic i" ⟨и⟩, which in Ukrainian represents the sound [ɪ], which appeared by the merger of the earlier sounds [ɨ] and [i]. Ukrainian also had newly developed the sound [i] from various origins, which is represented by ⟨i⟩ ("Cyrillic dotted i"). Yery could be found in several earlier versions of the Ukrainian writing system that were introduced in the 19th century among which were "Pavlovsky writing system", "Sloboda Ukraine (New) writing system", and "Yaryzhka".

=== In Rusyn ===
In Rusyn, it denotes [ɯ], a sound that is a bit harder than [ɨ] and similar to the Romanian sound î, which is also written â. In some cases, the letter may occur after palatalised consonants (синьый "blue", which never happens in Russian), and it often follows ⟨к⟩, ⟨г⟩, ⟨ґ⟩ and ⟨х⟩.

=== In Turkic languages ===
The letter ⟨ы⟩ is also used in Cyrillic-based alphabets of several Turkic and Mongolic languages (see the list) for a darker vowel [ɯ]. The corresponding letter in Latin-based scripts are ⟨ı⟩ (dotless I), I with bowl (Ь ь), and ⟨y⟩ (in Turkmen).

In Tuvan, the Cyrillic letter can be written as a double vowel.

=== In Mongolian ===
In Mongolian, yery is called (Жаран Нэгийн Ы, "Sixty One Yery"). It is used as a suffix in a lot of words in the Mongolian language. (Кирилл монгол бичгийн дүрэм "Mongolian Cyrillic Alphabet").

== Related letters and other similar characters ==
- И и : Cyrillic letter I
- Й й : Cyrillic letter Short I
- Ъ ъ : Cyrillic letter Yer
- Ꙑ ꙑ : Cyrillic letter Yeru with back Yer
- Ь ь : Cyrillic letter Soft sign
- Ҍ ҍ : Cyrillic letter semisoft sign
- Ѣ ѣ : Cyrillic letter yat
- I ı : Latin letter Dotless I
- Ь ь : Latin letter I with bowl
- Ư ư : Latin letter U with horn, the 26th letter of the Vietnamese alphabet.
- Y y : Latin letter Y
- Ý ý : Latin letter Ý
- B b : Latin letter B (lowercase)
- L l : Latin letter L (lowercase)

== Computing codes ==
Character information
Preview	Ы		ы		Ꙑ		ꙑ	
Unicode name	CYRILLIC CAPITAL LETTER YERU		CYRILLIC SMALL LETTER YERU		CYRILLIC CAPITAL LETTER YERU; WITH BACK YER		CYRILLIC SMALL LETTER YERU; WITH BACK YER	
Encodings	decimal	hex	dec	hex	dec	hex	dec	hex
Unicode	1067	U+042B	1099	U+044B	42576	U+A650	42577	U+A651
UTF-8	208 171	D0 AB	209 139	D1 8B	234 153 144	EA 99 90	234 153 145	EA 99 91
Numeric character reference	&#1067;	&#x42B;	&#1099;	&#x44B;	&#42576;	&#xA650;	&#42577;	&#xA651;
Named character reference	&Ycy;		&ycy;					
KOI8-R and KOI8-U	249	F9	217	D9				
Code page 855	242	F2	241	F1				
Code page 866	155	9B	235	EB				
Windows-1251	219	DB	251	FB				
ISO-8859-5	203	CB	235	EB				
Macintosh Cyrillic	155	9B	251	FB				
