= Zhe (Cyrillic) =

Letter of the Cyrillic script

Zhe (живѣтє)
- Ж ж

Usage
- Writing system: Cyrillic
- Type: Alphabetic
- Language of origin: Old Church Slavonic
- Sound values: [ʐ], [ʒ], [ʑ]
- In Unicode: U+0416, U+0436
- Alphabetical position: 7

History
- Development: Ϫ ϫ (possibly): Ⰶ ⰶ; Ж ж
- Transliterations: Zh zh, J j, Ž ž, Zhe zhe, Zha zha, Zhu zhu

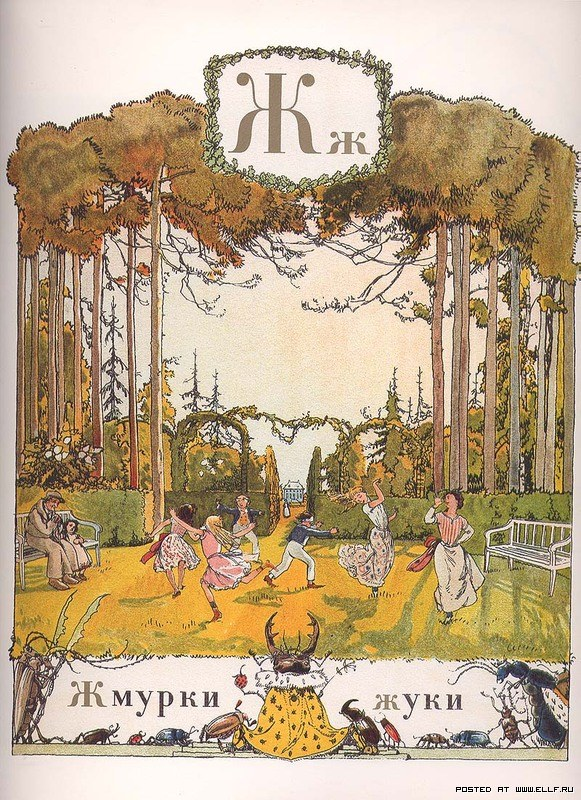
Zhe, from Alexandre Benois' 1904 Russian alphabet book. The image shows Zhmurki (blind man's buff) and zhuki (beetles).

Zhe, Zha, or Zhu, sometimes transliterated as Že (Ж ж; italics: Ж ж or Ж ж; italics: Ж ж) is a letter of the Cyrillic script. It commonly represents the voiced retroflex sibilant /ʐ/ or voiced postalveolar fricative /ʒ/, like the pronunciation of the ⟨s⟩ in "measure". It is also often used with D (Д) to approximate the sound in English of the Latin letter J with a ДЖ combination. Zhe is romanized as ⟨zh⟩, ⟨j⟩ or ⟨ž⟩.

== History ==
It is not known how the character for Zhe was derived. No similar letter exists in Greek, Latin or any other alphabet of the time, though there is some graphic similarity with its Glagolitic counterpart Zhivete ⟨Ⰶ⟩ which represents the same sound. However, the origin of Zhivete, like that of most Glagolitic letters, is unclear.

One possibility is that it was formed from the pronunciation of Hebrew letter Zayin ⟨ז⟩ combined with the Hebrew letter Shin ⟨ש⟩ letter, to eventually form the Modern Hebrew letter of Zhayin ⟨'ז⟩, with a geresh ⟨'⟩ on top for distinction.

Zhe may also be derived from the Coptic letter janjia ⟨Ϫ⟩, supported by the phonetic value (janjia represents the sound /d͡ʒ/ in Coptic) and shape of the letter, which the Glagolitic counterpart Zhivete ⟨Ⰶ⟩ resembles even more closely. The form of the letter also may be derived from an Egyptian hieroglyph depicting a drill:

U29

Some Ukrainian scholars argue that it represents the shape of a beetle, since Zhe is the first phoneme in the Slavic word жукъ (žuk), meaning "beetle".

In the Early Cyrillic alphabet the name of Zhe was живѣтє (živěte), meaning "live" (imperative).

Zhe was not used in the Cyrillic numeral system.

== Usage ==
Zhe is used in the alphabets of all Slavic languages using a Cyrillic alphabet, and of most non-Slavic languages which use a Cyrillic alphabet. The position in the alphabet and the sound represented by the letter vary from language to language.

Language	Position in alphabet	Represented sound	Romanization
Belarusian	8th	voiced retroflex fricative /ʐ/	zh
Bulgarian	7th	voiced postalveolar fricative /ʒ/	zh
Macedonian	8th	voiced postalveolar fricative /ʒ/	ž or zh
Russian	8th	voiced retroflex fricative /ʐ/	zh
Serbian	8th	voiced retroflex fricative /ʐ/	ž
Ukrainian	9th	voiced postalveolar fricative /ʒ/	zh
Uzbek (1940–1994)	8th	voiced postalveolar affricate /dʒ/ or voiced postalveolar fricative /ʒ/ (in Russian loanwords only)	j
Mongolian	8th	voiceless postalveolar affricate /tʃ/	j
Kazakh	10th	voiced alveolo-palatal fricative /ʑ/, sometimes voiced postalveolar affricate /dʒ/ in speech	j
Kyrgyz	8th	voiced postalveolar affricate /dʒ/	j
Dungan	9th	voiced retroflex fricative /ʐ/	r
other non-Slavic languages		voiced postalveolar fricative /ʒ/	

Zhe can also be used in Leet speak or faux Cyrillic in place of the letter ⟨x⟩, or to represent the symbol of the rap duo Kris Kross (a ligature of two back-to-back letter K's).

== Transliteration ==
Ж is most often transliterated as the digraph ⟨zh⟩ for English-language readers (as in Doctor Zhivago, Доктор Живаго, or Georgiy Zhukov, Георгий Жуков). In linguistics and for Central European readers, it is most often transliterated as ⟨ž⟩, with a háček. The scientific transliteration convention comes from Czech spelling and is also used in the Latin alphabets of several other Slavic languages (Slovak, Sorbian, Serbo-Croatian and Slovene). Thus, Leonid Brezhnev's surname (Леонид Брежнев) could be transliterated as "Brežnev", as it is spelled in a number of Slavic languages. Polish uses its own convention for transliteration of Cyrillic according to which ж is transliterated with the Polish letter ż (which is pronounced /ʐ/ in Polish). Ж is often transliterated ⟨j⟩ in Mongolian because of its pronunciation as [t͡ʃ].

== Related letters and other similar characters ==
- Ӂ ӂ : Cyrillic letter Zhe with breve
- Ź ź : Latin letter Z with acute
- Ž ž : Latin letter Z with caron
- Ż ż : Latin letter Z with dot above
- J j : Latin letter J - the same sound in Romanian, Turkish, Azerbaijani, French, Portuguese, and Catalan
- Ʒ ʒ : Latin letter Ezh
- Җ җ : Cyrillic letter Zhje
- Ӝ ӝ : Cyrillic letter Zhe with diaeresis

== Computing codes ==
Character information
Preview	Ж		ж	
Unicode name	CYRILLIC CAPITAL LETTER ZHE		CYRILLIC SMALL LETTER ZHE	
Encodings	decimal	hex	dec	hex
Unicode	1046	U+0416	1078	U+0436
UTF-8	208 150	D0 96	208 182	D0 B6
Numeric character reference	&#1046;	&#x416;	&#1078;	&#x436;
Named character reference	&ZHcy;		&zhcy;	
KOI8-R and KOI8-U	246	F6	214	D6
Code page 855	234	EA	233	E9
Code page 866	134	86	166	A6
Windows-1251	198	C6	230	E6
ISO-8859-5	182	B6	214	D6
Macintosh Cyrillic	134	86	230	E6

== See also ==
- Že
- Ž
