= Che (Cyrillic) =

Cyrillic letter

Che (чрьвь)
- Ч ч

Usage
- Writing system: Cyrillic
- Type: Alphabetic
- Language of origin: Old Church Slavonic
- Sound values: [tʃ], [tʃʰ], [tɕʰ], [tʂ], [tɕ]
- In Unicode: U+0427, U+0447

History
- Development: Ⱍ: Ч ч
- Transliterations: Ch ch, Č č, Ç ç

Other
- Associated numbers: 90, 60^{†} (Cyrillic numerals)

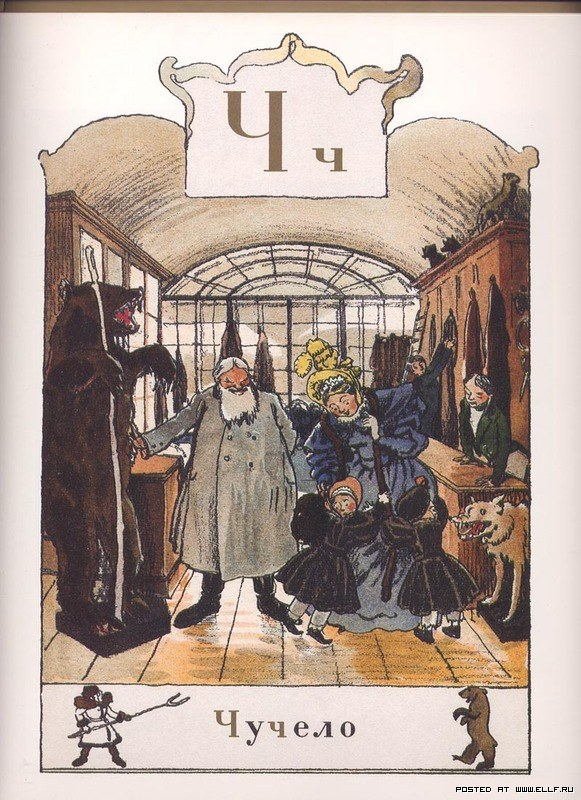
Che, from Alexandre Benois' 1904 alphabet book; it depicts a stuffed animal (chuchelo)

Che (Ч ч; italics: Ч ч) is a letter of the Cyrillic script.

It commonly represents the voiceless postalveolar affricate /tʃ/, like the ⟨tch⟩ in "switch" or ⟨ch⟩ in "choice".

In English, it is romanized typically as ⟨ch⟩ but sometimes as ⟨tch⟩, like in French. In German, it can be transcribed as ⟨tsch⟩. In Slavic languages using the Latin Alphabet, it is transcribed as ⟨č⟩ so "Tchaikovsky" (Чайковский in Russian) may be transcribed as Chaykovskiy or Čajkovskij.

== Form ==
Handwritten Che in Russian (that rarely resembles r)

The letter Che (Ч ч) resembles an upside-down lowercase Latin h, as well as resembling the digit 4, especially in digital or open-ended form. Cursive forms look like lowercase cursive forms of the letter R.

== History ==
The name of Che in the Early Cyrillic alphabet was Чрьвь (črĭvĭ), meaning "worm".

In the Cyrillic numeral system, Che originally did not have a value, however, by the 1300s it started to be used with the numeric value 90 as a replacement for Koppa, some varieties that preserved Koppa around this time used Che with the value 60 instead of the usual letter for it, Ksi. Nowadays, Koppa is not used anymore in any variety, and Che has fully replaced it as the letter with the numeric value 90.

== Usage ==
=== Slavic languages ===
Except for Russian, all Cyrillic-alphabet Slavic languages use Che to represent the voiceless postalveolar affricate /tʃ/ (the ch sound in English).

In Russian, Che usually represents the voiceless alveolo-palatal affricate /t͡ɕ/ (like the Mandarin pronunciation of j in pinyin). It is occasionally exceptionally pronounced as:

- the voiceless retroflex affricate /tʂ/ (like Mandarin pinyin zh), like in Russian: лучше, or
- the voiceless retroflex fricative /ʂ/ (like Mandarin pinyin sh), like in Russian: что, чтобы, нарочно.

=== In China ===
The 1955 draft of Hanyu pinyin adopted the Che for the sound [tɕ] (for which later the letter j was used), because of similar pronunciation and resemblance to the corresponding Bopomofo letter ㄐ.

The Latin Zhuang alphabet used a modified Hindu-Arabic numeral 4, strongly resembling Che, from 1957 to 1986 to represent the fourth (falling) tone. In 1986, it was replaced by the Latin letter X.

== Related letters and other similar characters ==
- 4 : 4 - Number that very closely resembles Che, especially in digital or open ended form
- C c : Latin letter C - the same sound in Malay, Indonesian, Italian
- Č č : Latin letter C with caron
- Ç ç : Latin letter C with cedilla - an Albanian, Azerbaijani, Kurdish, Turkish, and Turkmen letter
- Ĉ ĉ : Latin letter C with circumflex, used in Esperanto language
- Tx : Digraph Tx, used in Basque and Catalan.
- Ch : Digraph Ch
- Cs : Digraph Cs
- Cz : Digraph Cz
- Ҷ ҷ : Cyrillic letter Che with descender
- Ӵ ӵ : Cyrillic letter Che with diaeresis
- Ҹ ҹ : Cyrillic letter Che with vertical stroke
- Ӌ ӌ : Cyrillic letter Khakassian Che
- Ɥ ɥ : Latin letter turned H
- Վ վ : Armenian letter Vev
- Կ կ : Armenian letter Ken
- Ճ ճ : Armenian letter Che

== Computing codes ==
Character information
Preview	Ч		ч	
Unicode name	CYRILLIC CAPITAL LETTER CHE		CYRILLIC SMALL LETTER CHE	
Encodings	decimal	hex	dec	hex
Unicode	1063	U+0427	1095	U+0447
UTF-8	208 167	D0 A7	209 135	D1 87
Numeric character reference	&#1063;	&#x427;	&#1095;	&#x447;
Named character reference	&CHcy;		&chcy;	
KOI8-R and KOI8-U	254	FE	222	DE
Code page 855	252	FC	251	FB
Code page 866	151	97	231	E7
Windows-1251	215	D7	247	F7
ISO-8859-5	199	C7	231	E7
Macintosh Cyrillic	151	97	247	F7

== See also ==
- Che (Persian letter)
- Č
