= Ef (Cyrillic) =

Letter of the Cyrillic alphabet

Ef (фрьтъ)
- Ф ф

Usage
- Writing system: Cyrillic
- Type: Alphabetic
- Language of origin: Old Church Slavonic
- Sound values: [f]
- In Unicode: U+0424, U+0444

History
Development
O34
      - Φ φ
        - Ф ф
- Transliterations: F f

Other
- Associated numbers: 500 (Cyrillic numerals)

Ef or Fe (Ф ф; italics: Ф ф or Ф ф; italics: Ф ф) is a Cyrillic letter, commonly representing the voiceless labiodental fricative /f/, like the pronunciation of ⟨f⟩ in fill, flee or fall. The Cyrillic letter Ef is romanized as ⟨f⟩.

== History ==
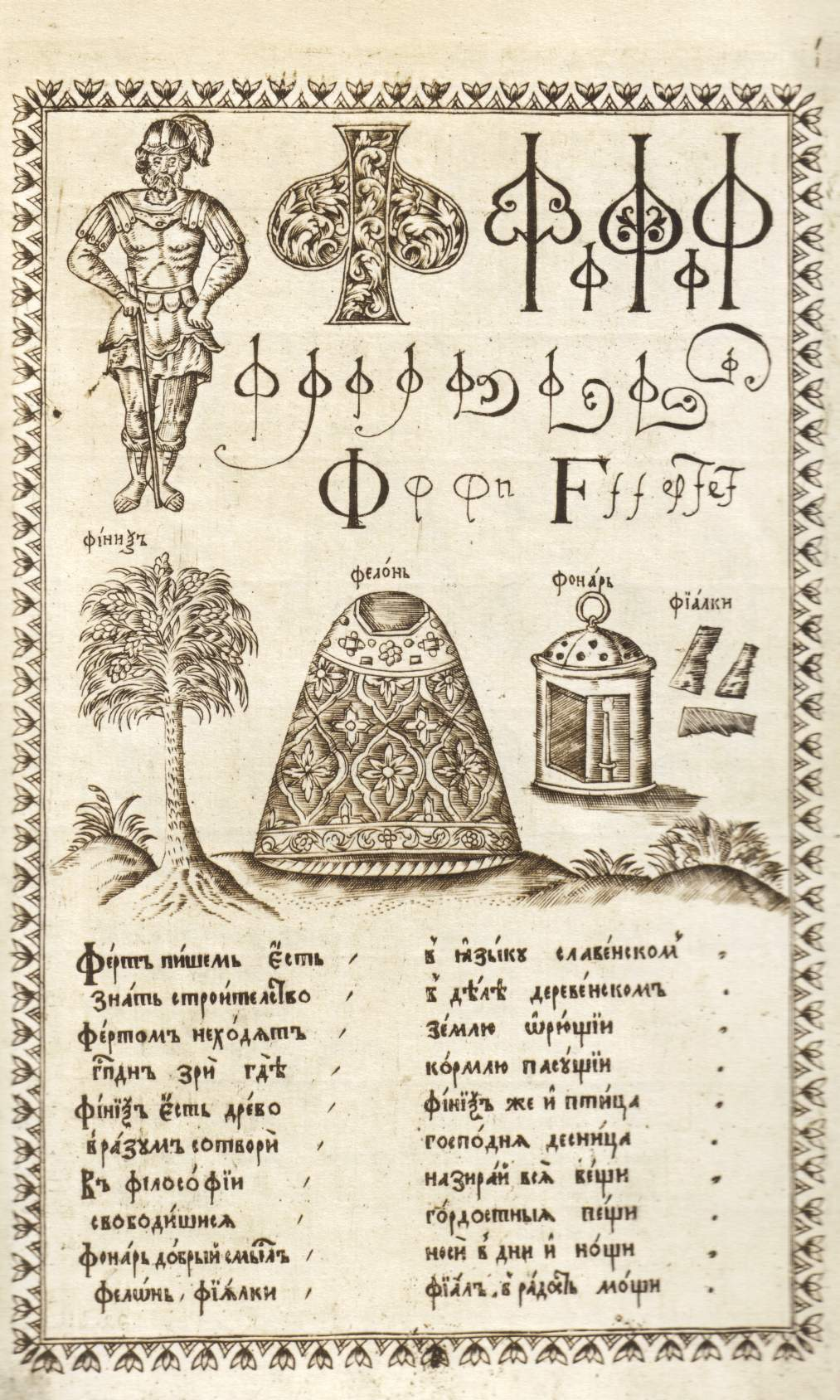
Ef, from Karion Istomin's 1694 alphabet book

The Cyrillic letter Ef was derived from the Greek letter Phi (Φ φ). It merged with and eliminated the letter Fita (Ѳ) in the Russian alphabet in 1918.

The name of Ef in the Early Cyrillic alphabet is фрьтъ (fr̥tŭ or frĭtŭ), in later Church Slavonic and Russian form it became фертъ (fert).

In the Cyrillic numeral system, Ef has a value of 500.

== Appearance and usage in Slavic languages ==
The Slavic languages have almost no native words containing /f/. This sound did not exist in Proto-Indo-European (PIE). It arose in Greek and Latin from PIE *bʰ (which yielded Slavic /b/). In some instances in Latin, it represented historical th-fronting and derived from Proto-Indo-European *dʰ. In the Germanic languages, the f sound arose from PIE *p via Grimm's law, which remained unchanged in Slavic. The letter ф is thus almost exclusively found in words of foreign origin, especially Greek (from φ and sometimes from θ), Latin, French, German, Dutch, English, and Turkic languages

Example borrowings in Russian:

- from Greek: катастрофа, "catastrophe" (from φ); Фёдор, "Theodore" (from θ; cf. Bulgarian Тодор)
- from Latin: федерация, "federation"; эффект, "effect"
- from German: картофель, "potato" (from Kartoffel); фунт, "pound" (from Pfund)
- from Dutch: флаг, "flag"
- from English: офис, "office"
- from French: Франция, "France"

The few native Slavic words with this letter (in different languages) are examples of onomatopoeia (like Russian verbs фукать, фыркать etc.) or reflect sporadic pronunciation shifts:

- from пв /pv/: Serbian уфати 'to hope' (cf. Church Slavonic уповати 'to hope')
- from хв /xv/: Macedonian сфати '(he) understands' (cf. Church Slavonic схватити 'to take, to catch'), Russian дрофа 'bustard' (cf. Ukrainian дрохва 'bustard')
- from кв /kv/: Russian филин 'eagle-owl' (cf. Ukrainian квилити 'to cry')
- from х /x/: Russian toponym Фили 'Fili' (from хилый 'sickly')

=== Slavic languages ===
Ef is the 21st letter of the Bulgarian alphabet; the 22nd letter of the Russian alphabet; the 23rd letter of the Belarusian alphabet; the 25th letter of the Serbian and Ukrainian alphabet; and the 26th letter of the Macedonian alphabet. It represents the consonant /f/ unless it is before a palatalizing vowel, when it represents /fʲ/.

== Related letters and other similar characters ==
- Φ φ/ϕ : Greek letter Phi
- Ѳ ѳ : Cyrillic letter Fita
- F f : Latin letter F
- Փ փ : Armenian letter Piwr
- Q q Latin letter Q
- Ჶ ჶ Fi (letter)

== Computing codes ==
Character information
Preview	Ф		ф	
Unicode name	CYRILLIC CAPITAL LETTER EF		CYRILLIC SMALL LETTER EF	
Encodings	decimal	hex	dec	hex
Unicode	1060	U+0424	1092	U+0444
UTF-8	208 164	D0 A4	209 132	D1 84
Numeric character reference	&#1060;	&#x424;	&#1092;	&#x444;
Named character reference	&Fcy;		&fcy;	
KOI8-R and KOI8-U	230	E6	198	C6
Code page 855	171	AB	170	AA
Code page 866	148	94	228	E4
Windows-1251	212	D4	244	F4
ISO-8859-5	196	C4	228	E4
Macintosh Cyrillic	148	94	244	F4

== Cultural references ==
The phraseologism "стоять фертом", "to stand as fert" means "to stand with arms akimbo".
