= Ze (Cyrillic) =

Letter of the Cyrillic script

Ze (зємл҄ꙗ)
- З з
- Ꙁ ꙁ

Usage
- Writing system: Cyrillic
- Type: Alphabetic
- Language of origin: Old Church Slavonic
- Sound values: [z], [zʲ] (if followed by е, и, ё, or ь, ю ,я)
- In Unicode: U+0417, U+0437, U+A640, U+A641
- Alphabetical position: 8

History
Development
Z4
        - Ζ ζ
          - З з
- Transliterations: Z z
- Variations: Ꙁ ꙁ

Other
- Associated numbers: 7 (Cyrillic numerals)

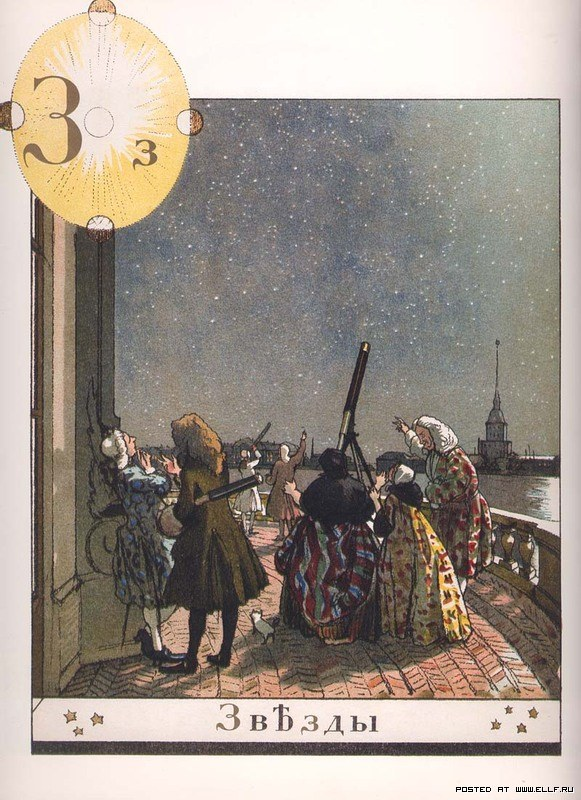
Ze, from Alexandre Benois' 1904 alphabet book, showing Zvedzy (stars)

Ze (З з; italics: З з or З з; italics: З з) is a letter of the Cyrillic script.

It commonly represents the voiced alveolar fricative /z/, like the pronunciation of ⟨z⟩ in "zulu".

Ze is romanized using the Latin letter ⟨z⟩.

The shape of Ze is very similar to the Arabic numeral three ⟨3⟩, and should not be confused with the Cyrillic letter E ⟨Э⟩.

== History and shape ==
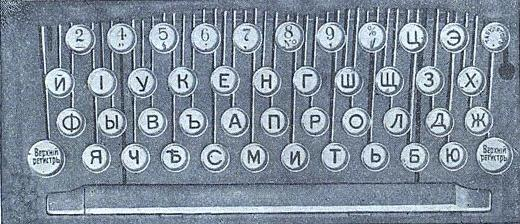
Russian typewriters like this one were manufactured without the digit 3 as the letter Ze could be used instead.

Ze is derived from the Greek letter Zeta (Ζ ζ).

In the Early Cyrillic alphabet its name was землꙗ (zemlja), meaning "earth". The shape of the letter originally looked similar to a Greek letter Ζ or Latin letter Z with a tail on the bottom (ꙁ). Though a majuscule form of this variant (Ꙁ) is encoded in Unicode, historically it was only used as caseless or lowercase.

In the Cyrillic numeral system, Zemlja had a value of 7.

Medieval Cyrillic manuscripts and Church Slavonic printed books have two variant forms of the letter Zemlja: з and ꙁ. Only the form ꙁ was used in the oldest ustav (uncial) writing style; з appeared in the later poluustav (half-uncial) manuscripts and typescripts, where the two variants are found at proportions of about 1:1. Some early grammars tried to give a phonetic distinction to these forms (like palatalized vs. nonpalatalized sound), but the system had no further development. Ukrainian scribes and typographers began to regularly use З/з in an initial position, and ꙁ otherwise (a system in use till the end of the 19th century). Russian scribes and typographers largely abandoned the widespread use of the variant ꙁ in favor of з in the wake of Patriarch Nikon's reforms. They still used the older form mostly in the case of two З's in row: ЗꙀ (the system in use till the mid-18th century).

The civil (Petrine) script knows only one shape of the letter: З/з. This shape is therefore confusing with the number 3, given that the two shapes are very similar to it. However, shapes similar to Z/z can be used in certain stylish typefaces.

In calligraphy and in general handwritten text, lowercase з can be written either fully over the baseline (similar to the printed form) or with the lower half under the baseline and with the loop (for the Russian language, a standard shape since the middle of the 20th century).

== Usage ==
The letter Ze may represent:

- /z/, the voiced alveolar sibilant (Macedonian, Bulgarian, Bosnian, Serbian, Montenegrin, Russian, Ukrainian, Rusyn and Belarusian);
- /zʲ/, if followed by ⟨ь⟩ or any of the palatalizing vowels, as in Russian зеркало [ˈzʲer.kə.ɫə] ('mirror');
- /s/, the voiceless alveolar sibilant (in final position or before voiceless consonants);
- /sʲ/, if followed by ⟨ь⟩ in final position or before voiceless consonants;
- /ʒ/ or /z̠/ (Iron dialect of Ossetian, but /z/ in Digoron and Kudairag);
- clusters ⟨зж⟩ and ⟨зш⟩ are pronounced in Russian as if they were ⟨жж⟩ and ⟨шш⟩, respectively (even if ⟨з⟩ is the last letter of a preposition, like in Russian без жены 'without wife' or из школы 'from school');
- cluster ⟨зч⟩ (sometimes also ⟨здч⟩) is pronounced in Russian as if it was ⟨щ⟩ (рассказчик 'narrator', звёздчатый 'stellar, star-shaped', без чая 'without tea');
- cluster ⟨дз⟩ can be pronounced (mostly in Ukrainian, Rusyn and Belarusian) as the voiced alveolar affricate /dz/ (Ukrainian дзеркало 'mirror') or its palatalized form /dzʲ/ (Belarusian гадзіннік 'clock'), but if ⟨д⟩ and ⟨з⟩ belong to different morphemes, then they are pronounced separately. In the standard Iron dialect of Ossetian, this cluster simply stands for /z/; other dialects treat it as the affricate /d͡z/.
- /t͡s/, the voiceless alveolar affricate in Mongolian, similar to German ⟨z⟩.

== Other related letters and similar characters ==
- 3 : Digit Three
- Ζ ζ : Greek letter Zeta
- Z z : Latin letter Z
- Ʒ ʒ : Latin letter Ezh
- Ȝ ȝ : Latin letter Yogh
- Ɜ ɜ : Latin letter reversed open E
- Ҙ ҙ : Cyrillic letter Dhe or Ze with descender
- Ӡ ӡ : Cyrillic letter Abkhazian Dze
- Ԑ ԑ : Cyrillic letter Reversed Ze

== Computing codes ==
Character information
Preview	З		з		Ꙁ		ꙁ	
Unicode name	CYRILLIC CAPITAL LETTER ZE		CYRILLIC SMALL LETTER ZE		CYRILLIC CAPITAL LETTER ZEMLYA		CYRILLIC SMALL LETTER ZEMLYA	
Encodings	decimal	hex	dec	hex	dec	hex	dec	hex
Unicode	1047	U+0417	1079	U+0437	42560	U+A640	42561	U+A641
UTF-8	208 151	D0 97	208 183	D0 B7	234 153 128	EA 99 80	234 153 129	EA 99 81
Numeric character reference	&#1047;	&#x417;	&#1079;	&#x437;	&#42560;	&#xA640;	&#42561;	&#xA641;
Named character reference	&Zcy;		&zcy;					
KOI8-R and KOI8-U	250	FA	218	DA				
Code page 855	244	F4	243	F3				
Code page 866	135	87	167	A7				
Windows-1251	199	C7	231	E7				
ISO-8859-5	183	B7	215	D7				
Macintosh Cyrillic	135	87	231	E7				
