= Te (Cyrillic) =

Cyrillic letter

Te (тврьдо)
- Т т
- ᲄ, ᲅ

Usage
- Writing system: Cyrillic
- Type: Alphabetic
- Language of origin: Old Church Slavonic
- Sound values: [t̪], [tʲ] (when followed by ь)
- In Unicode: U+0422, U+0442, U+1C84, U+1C85

History
Development
Z9
      - Τ τ
        - Т т
- Transliterations: T t
- Variations: ᲄ, ᲅ

Other
- Associated numbers: 300 (Cyrillic numerals)

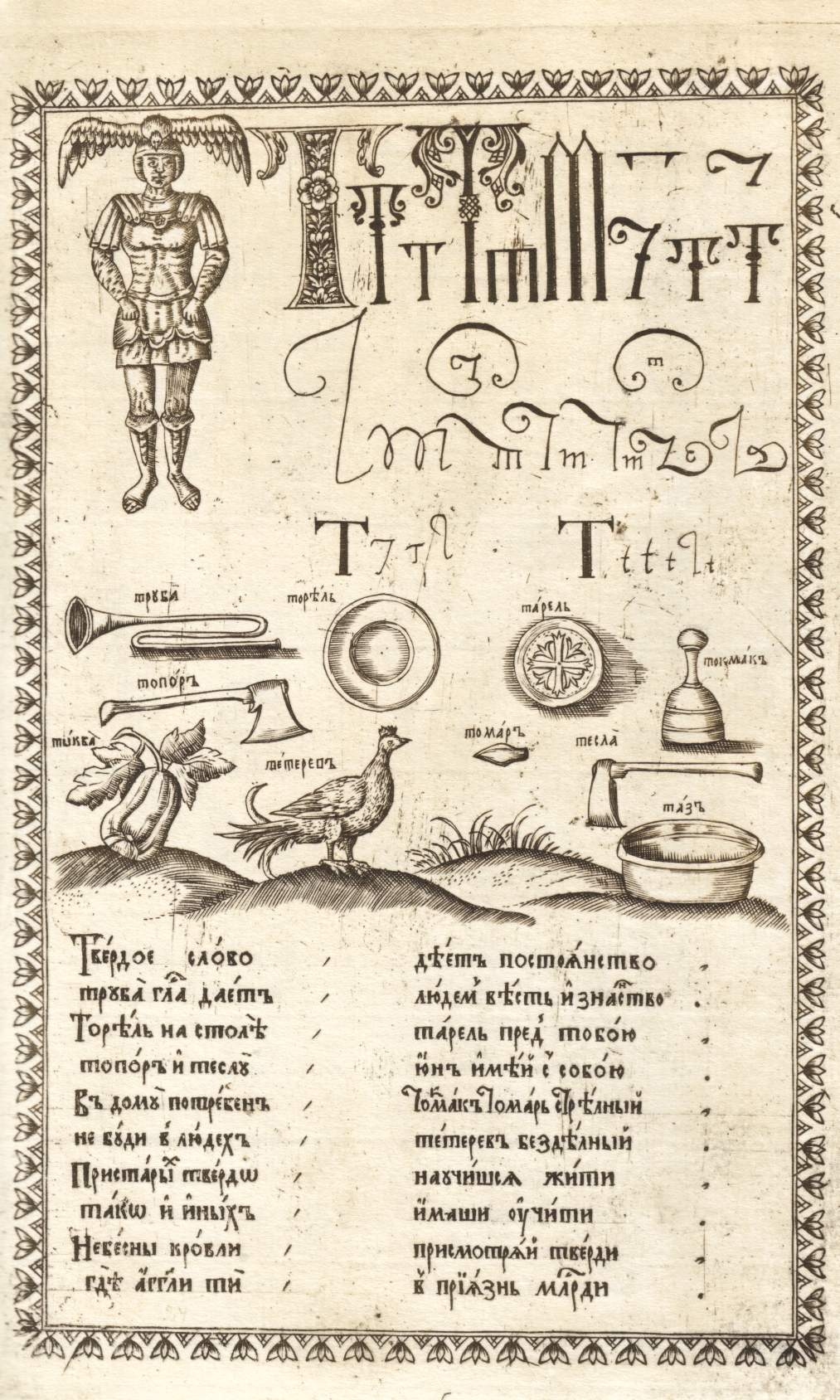
Te, from Karion Istomin's 1694 alphabet book

Te (Т т; italics: Т т or Т т; italics: Т т) is a letter of the Cyrillic script. It commonly represents the voiceless dental stop /t̪/, like the pronunciation of ⟨t⟩ in "tool". In most cursive writing, lowercase Te looks like the Latin lowercase m.

== History ==
The Cyrillic letter Te was derived from the Greek letter Tau (Τ τ).

The name of Te in the Early Cyrillic alphabet was тврьдо (tvrdo), meaning "hard" or "surly".

In the Cyrillic numeral system, Te has a value of 300.

== Form ==
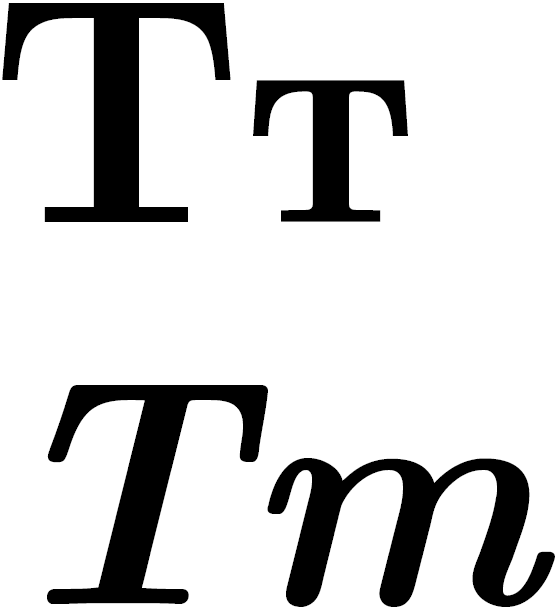
Normal and italic forms

The cursive form in Russian

The cursive form in Serbian and Macedonian

The capital Cyrillic letter Te (Т т) looks the same as the capital Latin letter T (T t) but, as with most Cyrillic letters, the lowercase form is simply a smaller version of the uppercase letter, same as М.

In italic type and cursive, the lowercase form ⟨т⟩ looks like the italic form of the lowercase Latin M ⟨m⟩, except in Serbian and Macedonian usage where it looks like an inverted lowercase Latin M, with a stroke above to distinguish it from the otherwise identical italic lowercase letter Sha ⟨ш⟩, which is sometimes written with a stroke below. Compare the 5th letter pair in the 4th row with the last letter pair of the chart.

The cursive form of the capital letter Te can also be seen in the chart following the lower case letter.

In some old materials, the lowercase form ⟨т⟩ has two variants: on the Trebnik of Metropolitan Peter and the Ostrog Bible this letter has a taller variant that looks like the number 7 (ᲄ); on some vernacular Russian publications up to the mid-19th century, this letter have been found as a variant resembling a turned Sha (ᲅ). Both of them were encoded in the Unicode Standard in June 2016 with the release of version 9.0.

== Usage ==
As used in the alphabets of various languages, Te represents the following sounds:

- voiceless alveolar plosive /t/, like the pronunciation of ⟨t⟩ in "tick"
- palatalized voiceless alveolar plosive /tʲ/

The pronunciations shown in the table are the primary ones for each language; for details consult the articles on the languages.

Language	Position in alphabet	Pronunciation
Belarusian	20th	/t/
Bulgarian	19th	/t/, /tʲ/
Macedonian	23rd	/t/
Mongolian	21st	/tʰ/, /tʰʲ/
Russian	20th	/t/, /tʲ/
Serbian	22nd	/t/
Ukrainian	23rd	/t/, /tʲ/

== Related letters and other similar characters ==
- Τ τ : Greek letter Tau
- T t : Latin letter T
- Ҭ ҭ : Cyrillic letter Ҭ
- Ԏ ԏ : Cyrillic letter Komi Tje
- Ћ ћ : Cyrillic Tshe

== Computing codes ==
Character information
Preview	Т		т		ᲄ		ᲅ	
Unicode name	CYRILLIC CAPITAL LETTER TE		CYRILLIC SMALL LETTER TE		CYRILLIC SMALL LETTER TALL TE		CYRILLIC SMALL LETTER THREE-LEGGED TE	
Encodings	decimal	hex	dec	hex	dec	hex	dec	hex
Unicode	1058	U+0422	1090	U+0442	7300	U+1C84	7301	U+1C85
UTF-8	208 162	D0 A2	209 130	D1 82	225 178 132	E1 B2 84	225 178 133	E1 B2 85
Numeric character reference	&#1058;	&#x422;	&#1090;	&#x442;	&#7300;	&#x1C84;	&#7301;	&#x1C85;
Named character reference	&Tcy;		&tcy;					
KOI8-R and KOI8-U	244	F4	212	D4				
Code page 855	230	E6	229	E5				
Windows-1251	210	D2	242	F2				
ISO-8859-5	194	C2	226	E2				
Macintosh Cyrillic	146	92	242	F2				

== See also ==
- Macedonian cursive alphabet
