= Er (Cyrillic) =

Cyrillic letter

Er (рьци)
- Р р

Usage
- Writing system: Cyrillic
- Type: Alphabetic
- Language of origin: Old Church Slavonic
- Sound values: [r], [ɾ]
- In Unicode: U+0420, U+0440

History
Development
D1
    - Ρ ρ
      - Р р
- Transliterations: R r

Other
- Associated numbers: 100 (Cyrillic numerals)

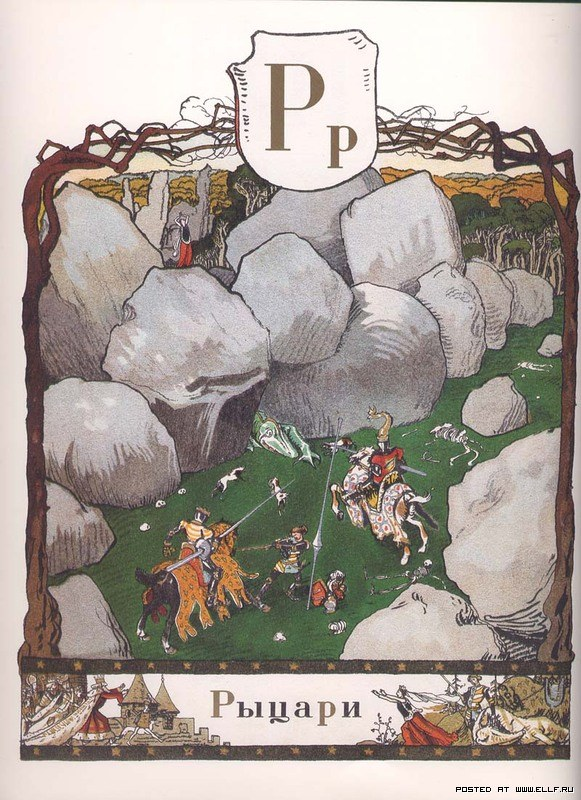
Er, from Alexandre Benois' 1904 alphabet book

Er (Р р; italics: Р р or Р р; italics: Р р) is a letter of the Cyrillic script.

It commonly represents the alveolar trill /r/, like the "rolled" sound in the Scottish pronunciation of ⟨r⟩ in "curd".

== History ==
The Cyrillic letter Er was derived from the Greek letter Rho (Ρ ρ). It has no connection to the Latin letter P (P p), which evolved from the Greek letter Pi (Π π), despite both having the same form.

The name of Er in the Early Cyrillic alphabet was рьци (rĭci), meaning "speak".

In the Cyrillic numeral system, er had a value of 100.

== Form ==
The Cyrillic letter Er (Р р) looks similar to the Greek letter Rho (Ρ ρ), and the same as the Latin letter P (P p; П in Cyrillic).

== Usage ==
As used in the alphabets of various languages, р represents the following sounds:

- alveolar trill /r/, like the "rolled" sound in the Scottish pronunciation of ⟨r⟩ in "curd"
- palatalized alveolar trill /rʲ/

The pronunciations shown in the table are the primary ones for each language; for details consult the articles on the languages.

Language	Position in alphabet	Pronunciation
Belarusian	18th	/r/
Bulgarian	17th	/r/, /rʲ/
Macedonian	21st	/r/
Russian	18th	/r/, /rʲ/
Serbian	20th	/r/
Ukrainian	21st	/r/, /rʲ/

== Related letters and other similar characters ==
- Ρ ρ/ϱ : Greek letter rho
- R r : Latin letter R
- P p : Latin letter P
- ₽ : Russian ruble sign
- П п : Cyrillic letter П
- Я я : Cyrillic letter Я

== Computing codes ==
Character information
Preview	Р		р	
Unicode name	CYRILLIC CAPITAL LETTER ER		CYRILLIC SMALL LETTER ER	
Encodings	decimal	hex	dec	hex
Unicode	1056	U+0420	1088	U+0440
UTF-8	208 160	D0 A0	209 128	D1 80
Numeric character reference	&#1056;	&#x420;	&#1088;	&#x440;
Named character reference	&Rcy;		&rcy;	
KOI8-R and KOI8-U	242	F2	210	D2
Code page 855	226	E2	225	E1
Code page 866	144	90	224	E0
Windows-1251	208	D0	240	F0
ISO-8859-5	192	C0	224	E0
Macintosh Cyrillic	144	90	240	F0
