= Sha (Cyrillic) =

Cyrillic letter

- Ш ш

Usage
- Writing system: Cyrillic
- Type: Alphabetic
- Language of origin: Old Church Slavonic
- Sound values: [ʂ], /ʃ/, /ɕ/
- In Unicode: U+0428, U+0448

History
- Development: Ⱎ: Ш ш
- Transliterations: Sh sh, Š š

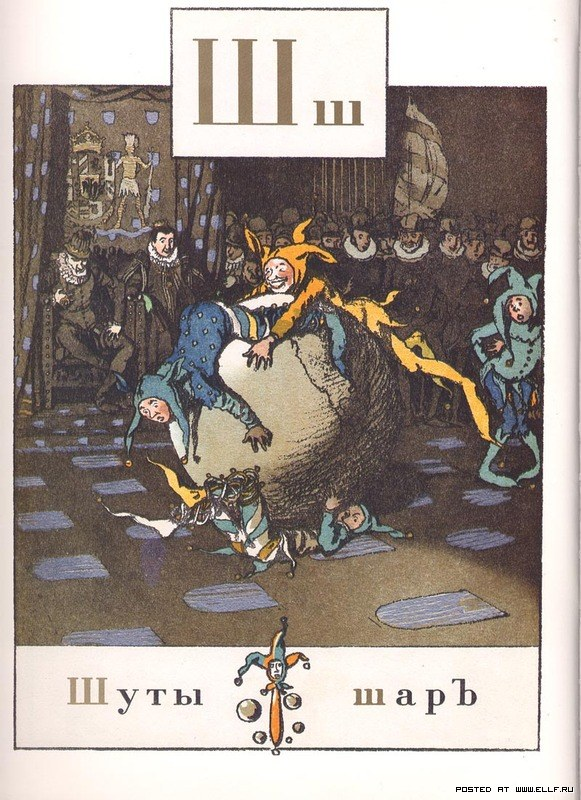
Sha, from Alexandre Benois' 1904 alphabet book. It shows Shuty ("jesters") and sharʺ ("sphere").

Sha, alternatively transliterated Ša (Ш ш; italics: Ш ш or Ш ш; italics: Ш ш) is a letter of the Glagolitic and Cyrillic scripts. It commonly represents the voiceless postalveolar fricative /ʃ/, like the pronunciation of sh in "shoe". More precisely, the sound in Russian denoted by ш is often falsely transcribed as a palatoalveolar fricative, but is actually a voiceless retroflex fricative /ʂ/. It is used in every variation of the Cyrillic alphabet for Slavic and non-Slavic languages.

In English, Sha is romanized as sh or as š, the latter being the equivalent letter in the Latin alphabets of Czech, Slovak, Slovene, Serbo-Croatian, Latvian and Lithuanian.

== History ==
Sha has its earliest origins in Phoenician Shin and is possibly linked closely to Shin's Greek equivalent: Sigma (Σ, σ, ς). (The similar form of the modern Hebrew Shin (ש), which is probably where the Cyrillic letter was actually derived from, derives from the same Proto-Canaanite source). Sha already possessed its current form in Saints Cyril and Methodius's Glagolitic alphabet. Most Cyrillic letter-forms were derived from the Greek, but as there was no Greek sign for the Sha sound (modern Greek uses simply "Σ/σ/ς" to spell the sh-sound in foreign words and names), Glagolitic Sha (Ⱎ) was adopted unchanged. There is also a possibility that Sha was taken from the Coptic alphabet, which is the same as the Greek alphabet but with a few letters added at the end, including one called "shai" (Ϣϣ) which somewhat resembles both sha and shcha (Щ, щ) in appearance.

== Usage ==
Sha is used in the alphabets of all Slavic languages using a Cyrillic alphabet, and of most non-Slavic languages which use a Cyrillic alphabet. The position in the alphabet and the sound represented by the letter vary from language to language.

Language	Position in alphabet	Represented sound	Romanization
Belarusian	27th	voiceless retroflex fricative /ʂ/	š
Bulgarian	25th	voiceless postalveolar fricative /ʃ/	sh
Macedonian	31st	voiceless postalveolar fricative /ʃ/	š or sh
Russian	26th	voiceless retroflex fricative /ʂ/	sh
Serbian	30th	voiceless retroflex fricative /ʂ/	š
Ukrainian	29th	voiceless postalveolar fricative /ʃ/	sh
Uzbek (1940–1994)	26th	voiceless postalveolar fricative /ʃ/	sh
Mongolian	28th	voiceless postalveolar affricate /ʃ/	š
Kazakh	34th	voiceless alveolo-palatal fricative /ɕ/	ş
Kyrgyz	29th	voiceless postalveolar fricative /ʃ/	ş
Dungan	31st	voiceless retroflex fricative /ʂ/	sh
other non-Slavic languages		voiceless postalveolar fricative /ʃ/	

== Use in mathematics ==
The Cyrillic letter Ш is internationally used in mathematics for several concepts:

In algebraic geometry, the Tate–Shafarevich group of an Abelian variety A over a field K is denoted Ш(A/K), a notation first suggested by J. W. S. Cassels. (Previously it had been denoted TS.) Presumably the choice comes from the first letter of Шафаре́вич = Shafarevich.

In a different mathematical context, some authors allude to the shape of the letter Sha when they use the term Shah function for what is otherwise called a Dirac comb.

The shuffle product is often denoted by ш.

== Related letters ==
- ש : Hebrew letter ש
- श: Devanagari letter श
- ष: Devanagari letter ष
- श़: Devanagari letter श़
- Ⱎ : Glagolitic letter Sha/ša
- Ⱋ : Glagolitic letter Shta/šta or Shcha/šča
- Ꚗ ꚗ : Cyrillic letter Shwe
- Щ щ : Cyrillic letter Shcha
- ⧢ : Shuffle product
- Ʃ ʃ : Latin letter Esh
- Š š : Latin letter S with caron
- Ŝ ŝ : Latin letter S with circumflex
- Ş ş : Latin letter S with cedilla
- Ș ș : Latin letter S with comma below

== Computing codes ==
Character information
Preview	Ш		ш	
Unicode name	CYRILLIC CAPITAL LETTER SHA		CYRILLIC SMALL LETTER SHA	
Encodings	decimal	hex	dec	hex
Unicode	1064	U+0428	1096	U+0448
UTF-8	208 168	D0 A8	209 136	D1 88
Numeric character reference	&#1064;	&#x428;	&#1096;	&#x448;
Named character reference	&SHcy;		&shcy;	
KOI8-R and KOI8-U	251	FB	219	DB
Code page 855	246	F6	245	F5
Code page 866	152	98	232	E8
Windows-1251	216	D8	248	F8
ISO-8859-5	200	C8	232	E8
Macintosh Cyrillic	152	98	248	F8
