= De (Cyrillic) =

Cyrillic letter

De (добро)
- Д д

Usage
- Writing system: Cyrillic
- Type: Alphabetic
- Language of origin: Old Church Slavonic
- Sound values: [d̪], [t]
- In Unicode: U+0414, U+0434, U+1C81
- Alphabetical position: 5

History
Development
O31
      - Δ δ
        - Д д
- Transliterations: D d

Other
- Associated numbers: 4 (Cyrillic numerals)

De (Д д; italics: Д д or Д д; italics: Д д) is a letter of the Cyrillic script. It commonly represents the voiced dental stop /d̪/, like the pronunciation of ⟨d⟩ in "door", except closer to the teeth. De is usually Romanized using the Latin letter D.

== History ==
The Cyrillic letter De was derived from the Greek letter Delta (Δ δ).

In the Early Cyrillic alphabet its name was добро (dobro), meaning "good."

In the Cyrillic numeral system, De had a value of 4.

== Form ==
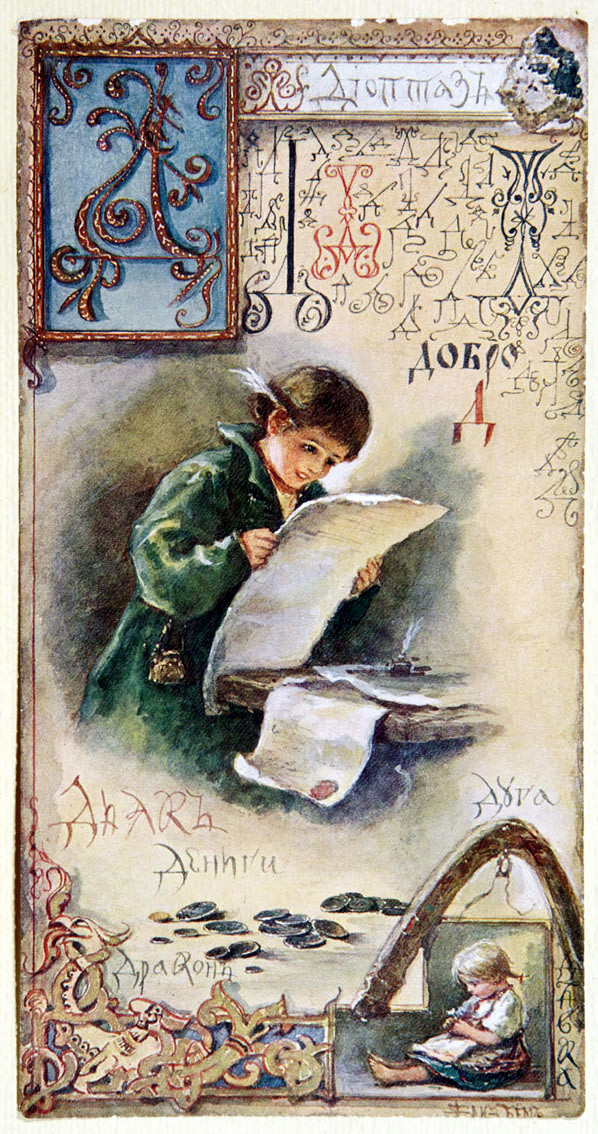
De, from Elizaveta Bem's alphabet book

The major graphic difference between De and its modern Greek equivalent lies in the two descenders ("feet") below the lower corners of the Cyrillic letter. The descenders were borrowed from a Byzantine uncial shape of uppercase Delta.

De, like the Cyrillic letter El, has two typographical variants i.e. an older variant where its top is pointed (akin to uppercase Greek letter ⟨Δ⟩) and a modern one (first used in mid-19th-century fonts) where it is square. Nowadays, almost all books and magazines are printed with fonts with the second variant of the letter — the first one is rather stylish and only a few popular text fonts use it (the best known example is "Baltika" designed in 1951-52 by V. G. Chiminova and others).

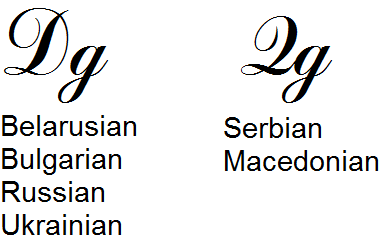
handwritten forms

In italic (Russian) type — the lowercase form looks more like the lowercase Latin ⟨d⟩, a mirrored numeral ⟨6⟩ or a partial derivative symbol ⟨∂⟩. Southern (Serbian, Bulgarian, Macedonian) typography may prefer a variant that looks like a single-storey lowercase Latin ⟨g⟩. Cursive lowercase De has the same two shapes, but with a different distribution e.g. the single-storey lowercase Latin g-shaped variant is a standard for schools in Russia, Ukraine, Belarus but also used for certain typefaces with OpenType features.

The Belarusian, Bulgarian, Russian, and Ukrainian cursive form of capital De looks like Latin ⟨D⟩ as the printed version is not comfortable enough to be written quickly. The Serbian cursive form is closer to the shape of a numeral ⟨2⟩ (akin to the form sometimes used for uppercase cursive Latin ⟨Q⟩) — this form is unknown in Russia, Ukraine, Belarus, Bulgaria.

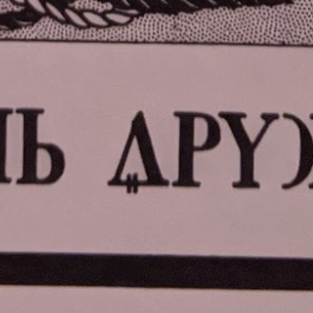
Uncommon variant of Cyrillic ⟨Д⟩ e.g. uppercase Greek letter ⟨Δ⟩ with single/two vertical strokes at the horizontal bottom.

Ukrainian diaspora have been known to write the triangle form, namely uppercase Greek letter ⟨Δ⟩ with single/two vertical strokes going through the horizontal bottom.

== Usage ==
As used in the alphabets of various languages, De represents the following sounds:

- voiced alveolar plosive /d/, like the pronunciation of ⟨d⟩ in "dire"
- palatalized voiced alveolar plosive /dʲ/
- Voiceless alveolar plosive /t/, like the pronunciation of ⟨t⟩ in "team"
- palatalized voiceless alveolar plosive /tʲ/

The pronunciations shown in the table are the primary ones for each language; for details consult the articles on the languages.

Language	Position in alphabet	Pronunciation
Belarusian	5th	/d/
Bulgarian	5th	/d/, /t/
Macedonian	5th	/d/
Mongolian	5th	/t/, /tʲ/
Russian	5th	/d/
Serbian	5th	/d/
Ukrainian	6th	/d/, /dʲ/

== Related letters and other similar characters ==
- Δ δ : Greek letter Delta
- D d : Latin letter D
- Л л : Cyrillic letter El
- Ԁ ԁ : Cyrillic letter Komi De
- G g : Latin letter G
- Ꭰ : Cherokee syllabary letter Ah
- ∂ : Partial derivative symbol
- 𐍓 : Abur letter Doi

== Computing codes ==
Character information
Preview	Д		д		ᲁ	
Unicode name	CYRILLIC CAPITAL LETTER DE		CYRILLIC SMALL LETTER DE		CYRILLIC SMALL LETTER LONG-LEGGED DE	
Encodings	decimal	hex	dec	hex	dec	hex
Unicode	1044	U+0414	1076	U+0434	7297	U+1C81
UTF-8	208 148	D0 94	208 180	D0 B4	225 178 129	E1 B2 81
Numeric character reference	&#1044;	&#x414;	&#1076;	&#x434;	&#7297;	&#x1C81;
Named character reference	&Dcy;		&dcy;			
KOI8-R and KOI8-U	228	E4	196	C4		
Code page 855	167	A7	166	A6		
Windows-1251	196	C4	228	E4		
ISO-8859-5	180	B4	212	D4		
Macintosh Cyrillic	132	84	228	E4		
