= El (Cyrillic) =

Cyrillic letter

El (людиѥ)
- Л л

Usage
- Writing system: Cyrillic
- Type: Alphabetic
- Language of origin: Old Church Slavonic
- Sound values: [l], [lʲ], [w], [ɫ], [ɮ], [ɮʲ]
- In Unicode: U+041B, U+043B

History
Development
S39
        - Λ λ
          - Л л
- Descendants: Љ љ
- Transliterations: L l

Other
- Associated numbers: 30 (Cyrillic numerals)

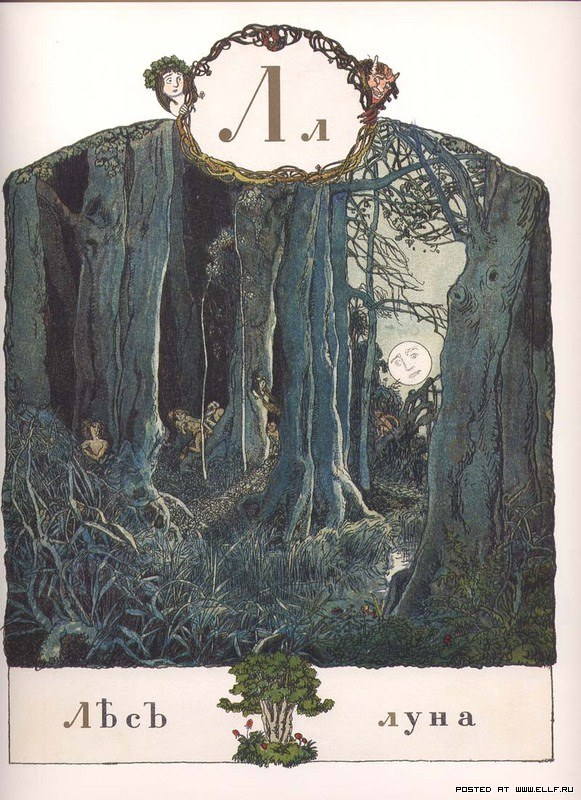
El, from Alexandre Benois' 1904 alphabet book

El (Л л; italics: Л л or Л л; italics: Л л) is a letter of the Cyrillic script.

El commonly represents the alveolar lateral approximant /l/. In Slavic languages it may be either palatalized or slightly velarized; see below.

== History ==
The Cyrillic letter El was derived from the Greek letter lambda (Λ λ).

In the Early Cyrillic alphabet its name was людиѥ (ljudije), meaning "people".

In the Cyrillic numeral system, Л had a value of 30.

== Forms ==
El has two forms: one form resembles Greek capital Lambda (Λ ʌ), and the other form resembles the Hebrew letter ת (Л л).

In some typefaces the Cyrillic letter El has a grapheme which may be confused with the Cyrillic letter Pe (П п). Note that Pe has a straight left leg, without the hook. An alternative form of El (Λ ʌ) is more common in Russian, Ukrainian, Belarusian, Bulgarian, Macedonian, and Serbian.

== Usage ==
As used in the alphabets of various languages, El represents the following sounds:

- alveolar lateral approximant /l/, like the pronunciation of ⟨l⟩ in "lip"
- palatalized alveolar lateral approximant /lʲ/
- velarized alveolar lateral approximant /ɫ/, like the pronunciation of ⟨l⟩ in "bell" and "milk"
- Labiovelar approximant /w/, like the ⟨w⟩ in "water"
- voiced alveolar lateral fricative /ɮ/ and its palatalized equivalent /ɮʲ/

The /l/ phoneme in Slavic languages has two realizations: hard ([l], [ɫ], or [lˠ], exact pronunciation varies) and soft (pronounced as [lʲ]) – see palatalization for details. Serbian and Macedonian orthographies use a separate letter Љ for the soft /l/ – it looks as a ligature of El with the soft sign (Ь). In these languages, ⟨Л⟩ denotes only hard /l/. Pronunciation of hard /l/ is sometimes given as [l], but it is always more velar than [l] in French or German.

Slavic languages except Serbian and Macedonian use another orthographic convention to distinguish between hard and soft /l/, so ⟨Л⟩ can denote either variant depending on the subsequent letter.

The pronunciations shown in the table are the primary ones for each language.

Language	Position in alphabet	Pronunciation
Belarusian	13th	/ɫ/, /lʲ/
Bulgarian	12th	/w~ɫ/, /l/
Kazakh	16th	/ɫ~l/
Macedonian	14th	/l/
Mongolian	13th	/ɮ/, /ɮʲ/
Ossetian	16th	/ɫ~l/
Russian	13th	/ɫ/, /lʲ/
Serbian	13th	/l/
Tuvan	13th	/l/
Ukrainian	16th	/ɫ/, /lʲ/

In addition, л was formerly used in Chukchi to represent the voiceless alveolar lateral fricative /ɬ/ but has since been replaced by ԓ.

=== Use in mathematics ===
El is sometimes used to represent the Clausen function, and if not, the capital greek letter Lambda is.

== Related letters and other similar characters ==
- Λ λ : Greek letter Lambda
- Љ љ : Cyrillic letter Lje
- Ӆ ӆ : Cyrillic letter El with tail
- Ԓ ԓ : Cyrillic letter El with hook
- Ԯ ԯ : Cyrillic letter El with descender
- L l : Latin letter L
- Ł ł : Latin letter L with stroke
- ת : Hebrew letter Taw

== Computing codes ==
Character information
Preview	Л		л	
Unicode name	CYRILLIC CAPITAL LETTER EL		CYRILLIC SMALL LETTER EL	
Encodings	decimal	hex	dec	hex
Unicode	1051	U+041B	1083	U+043B
UTF-8	208 155	D0 9B	208 187	D0 BB
Numeric character reference	&#1051;	&#x41B;	&#1083;	&#x43B;
Named character reference	&Lcy;		&lcy;	
KOI8-R and KOI8-U	236	EC	204	CC
Code page 855	209	D1	208	D0
Code page 866	139	8B	171	AB
Windows-1251	203	CB	235	EB
ISO-8859-5	187	BB	219	DB
Macintosh Cyrillic	139	8B	235	EB
