= Ve (Cyrillic) =

Letter of the Cyrillic script

Ve (Vědě/вѣдѣ)
- В в
- (See below)

Usage
- Writing system: Cyrillic script
- Type: Alphabetic
- Language of origin: Old Church Slavonic
- Sound values: [v] [f] [u̯] [β] [ʋ] [w] [ʷ]
- In Unicode: U+0412, U+0432, U+1C80
- Alphabetical position: 3

History
Development
O1
        - B β
          - В в
- Time period: ~900 to present
- Sisters: B b; B β; Б б; Ƃ ƃ
- Transliterations: V v
- Variations: (See below)

Other
- Associated numbers: 2
- Writing direction: Left-to-right

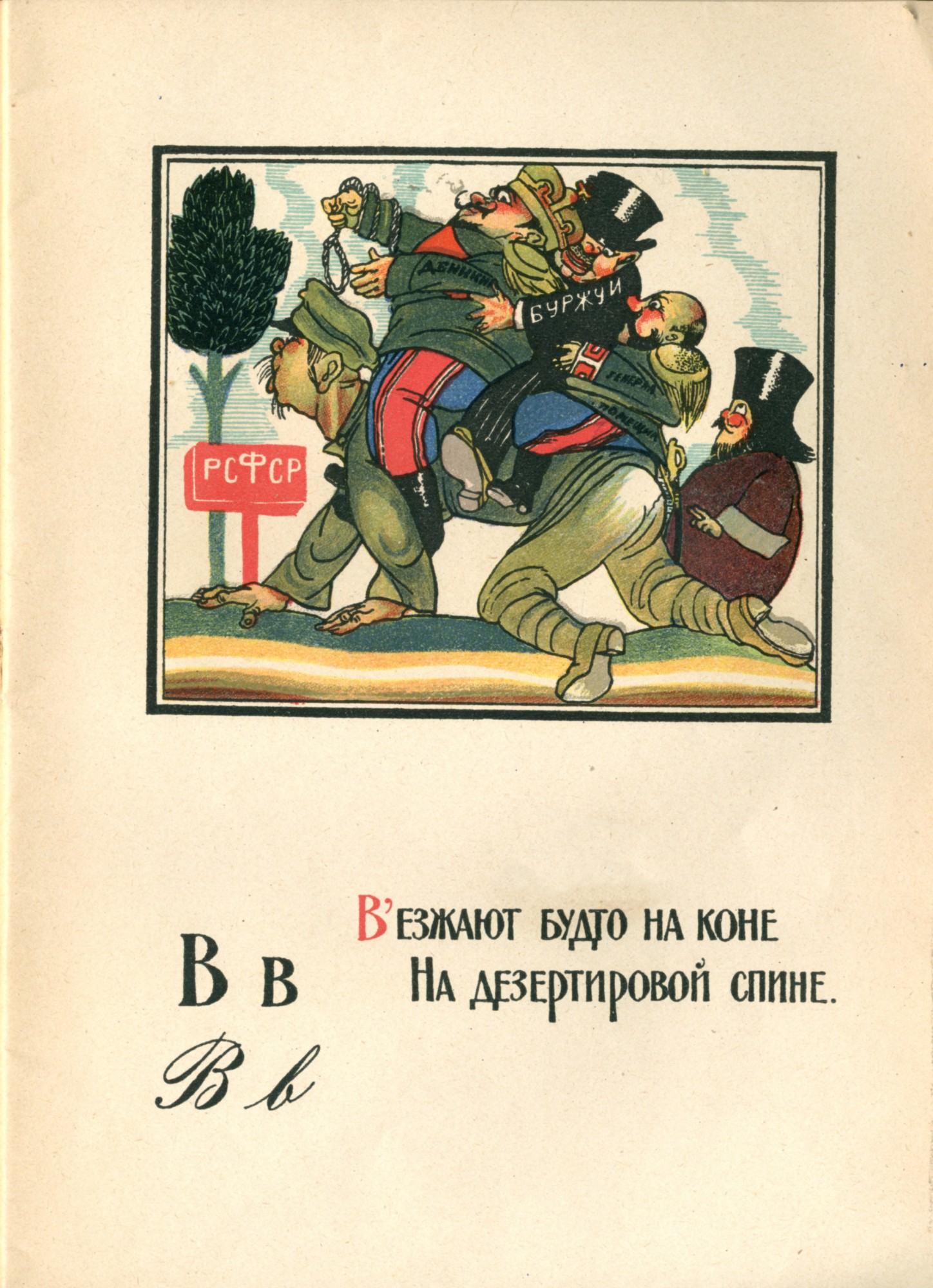
Ve, from the Alphabet Book оf the Red Army soldier (1921)

Ve (В в; italics: В в or В в; italics: В в) is a letter of the Cyrillic script. It commonly represents the voiced labiodental fricative /v/, like ⟨v⟩ in "vase". It can also represent /ʋ/.

The capital letter Ve looks the same as the capital Latin letter B, but is pronounced differently.

Ve is commonly romanized by the Latin letter V (as described by ISO 9), but sometimes the Latin letter W is used instead, such as in Polish, or by the German Duden transcription.

== History ==
Both Ve and the Cyrillic letter Be (Б б) were derived from the Greek letter Beta (Β β), which already represented /v/ in Greek by the time the Cyrillic alphabet was created.

In the Early Cyrillic alphabet, its name was вѣдѣ (vědě), meaning "I know". In the old Russian alphabet the name was vedi.

In the Cyrillic numeral system, it had the value of 2.

== Form ==
The cursive, handwritten, and italic forms look rounded like the capital letter, or the Greek letter beta (ϐ). This form is also used in Bulgarian forms.

== Usage ==
In Russian and Bulgarian, Ve generally represents /v/, but at the end of a word or before voiceless consonants, it represents the voiceless [f]. Before a palatalizing vowel or soft sign, it represents /vʲ/.

In standard Ukrainian pronunciation (based on the Poltava dialect), Ve usually represents [ʋ] in the word initial position (or preceding most vowels) and a sound like the English W ([w]) when in the word final position. Because of this, it is not uncommon to see words ending in ⟨в⟩ transcribed to end in ⟨w⟩, for example, Владислав = Vladyslaw for Vladislav.

Additionally, some Ukrainians also use this pronunciation in words where the letter is directly preceded by a consonant, while for others all occurrences of the letter Ve denote [w]. In Eastern Ukraine, the letter Ve may represent a voiceless [f], but this is considered a Russianism, as word-final devoicing does not occur in standard Ukrainian. For example, the standard Ukrainian pronunciation of the word сказав ([he] said) is /skazaw/. However, in Eastern Ukraine one is likely to hear the Russified [skazaf] (with final devoicing).

In Belarusian, the letter Ve represents only the sound /v/. In the word final position, or if directly proceeded by a consonant, it mutates to the letter Short U (Ў ў), a Belarusian letter representing the sound /w/. E.g., the Belarusian noun "language" is мова (mova), but the adjectival form is моўны (mowny), and the genitive plural of the noun (formed by removing the final ⟨а⟩) is моў (mow).

In Rusyn, the letter Ve represents the sound /v/, or /w/ if it is at the end of the word.

In Serbian and Montenegrin, the letter Ve represents only the sound /v/.

In Macedonian the letter is used for the sound /v/, but if the letter appears at the end of the word then it is pronounced as /f/. An example of this is the word бев [bɛf] ('I was').

In Tuvan, it is used for /ʋ/.

In Mongolian, Kalmyk, and Dungan, it is used for /w/.

In Bashkir, /v/ in Russian loanwords and /w/ in Arabic and Persian loanwords.

== Related letters and other similar characters ==
- Β β : Greek letter Beta
- Б б : Cyrillic letter Be
- Ѵ ѵ : Cyrillic Letter Izhitsa
- B b : Latin letter B
- V v : Latin letter V
- W w : Latin letter W
- Ԝ ԝ : Cyrillic Letter We

== Computing codes ==
Character information
Preview	В		в		ᲀ	
Unicode name	CYRILLIC CAPITAL LETTER VE		CYRILLIC SMALL LETTER VE		CYRILLIC SMALL LETTER ROUNDED VE	
Encodings	decimal	hex	dec	hex	dec	hex
Unicode	1042	U+0412	1074	U+0432	7296	U+1C80
UTF-8	208 146	D0 92	208 178	D0 B2	225 178 128	E1 B2 80
Numeric character reference	&#1042;	&#x412;	&#1074;	&#x432;	&#7296;	&#x1C80;
Named character reference	&Vcy;		&vcy;			
KOI8-R and KOI8-U	247	F7	215	D7		
CP 855	236	EC	235	EB		
Windows-1251	194	C2	226	E2		
ISO-8859-5	178	B2	210	D2		
Mac Cyrillic	130	82	226	E2		
