= Pe (Cyrillic) =

Cyrillic letter

Pe (покои)
- П п

Usage
- Writing system: Cyrillic
- Type: Alphabetic
- Language of origin: Old Church Slavonic
- Sound values: [p], [pʰ]
- In Unicode: U+041F, U+043F

History
Development
D21
        - Π π
          - П п
- Transliterations: P p

Other
- Associated numbers: 80 (Cyrillic numerals)

Pe (П п; italics: П п or П п; italics: П п) is a letter of the Cyrillic script.

It commonly represents the unaspirated voiceless bilabial plosive /p/, like the pronunciation of ⟨p⟩ in "spin".

== History ==
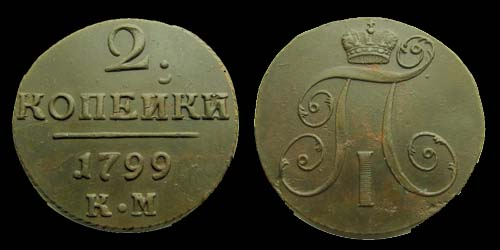
1799 coin with the monogram of Tsar Paul

The Cyrillic letter Pe was derived from the Greek letter Pi (Π π).

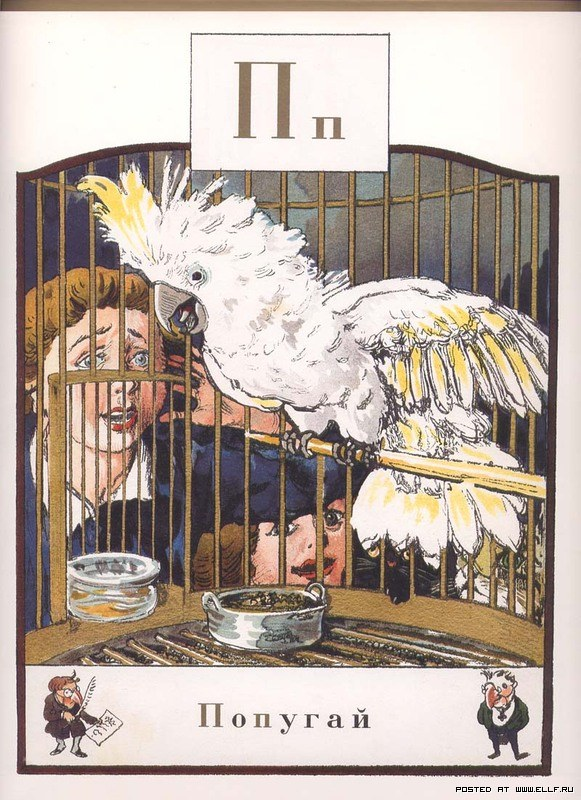
Pe, from Alexandre Benois' 1904 alphabet book

The name of Pe in the Early Cyrillic alphabet was покои (pokoi), meaning "peaceful state".

In the Cyrillic numeral system, Pe had a value of 80.

== Form ==
Handwritten Pe in Russian

The capital Cyrillic letter Pe looks exactly like the Greek capital Pi from which it is derived, and small Pe looks like a smaller version of the same, though with a less prominent horizontal bar (Greek Π π > Cyrillic П п). Pe is not to be confused with the Cyrillic letter El (Л л; italics: Л л), which has a hook on its left leg in some fonts (in others El resembles the Greek Lambda (Λ)).

In italics and handwriting, capital Pe looks identical to the Greek capital Pi in these forms. The lowercase forms, however, differ among the languages that use the Cyrillic alphabet. Small italic Cyrillic Pe ⟨п⟩ in the majority of fonts or handwritten styles looks like the small italic Latin N ⟨n⟩. In handwritten Serbian, however, it appears as a Latin U ⟨u⟩ with a bar over it ⟨ū⟩.

== Usage ==
As used in the alphabets of various languages, Pe represents the following sounds:

- voiceless bilabial plosive /p/, like the pronunciation of ⟨p⟩ in "pack"
- palatalized voiceless bilabial plosive /pʲ/

The pronunciations shown in the table are the primary ones for each language; for details consult the articles on the languages.

| Language | Position in alphabet | Pronunciation |
|---|---|---|
| Belarusian | 17th | /p/, /pʲ/ |
| Bulgarian | 16th | /p/, /pʲ/ |
| Macedonian | 20th | /p/ |
| Russian | 17th | /p/, /pʲ/ |
| Serbian | 19th | /p/ |
| Ukrainian | 20th | /p/, /pʲ/ |
| Kazakh | 22nd | /p/ |
| Abkhaz | 19th | /pʼ/ |

== Related letters and other similar characters ==
- Π π : Greek letter Pi
- Ԥ ԥ : Cyrillic letter Pe with descender
- Ҧ ҧ : Cyrillic letter Pe with middle hook
- Л л : Cyrillic letter El
- N n : Latin letter N
- P p : Latin letter P
- Р р : Cyrillic letter Er

== Computing codes ==
Character information
| Preview | П | | п | |
|---|---|---|---|---|
| Unicode name | CYRILLIC CAPITAL LETTER PE | | CYRILLIC SMALL LETTER PE | |
| Encodings | decimal | hex | dec | hex |
| Unicode | 1055 | U+041F | 1087 | U+043F |
| UTF-8 | 208 159 | D0 9F | 208 191 | D0 BF |
| Numeric character reference | &#1055; | &#x41F; | &#1087; | &#x43F; |
| Named character reference | &Pcy; | | &pcy; | |
| KOI8-R and KOI8-U | 240 | F0 | 208 | D0 |
| Code page 855 | 221 | DD | 216 | D8 |
| Windows-1251 | 207 | CF | 239 | EF |
| ISO-8859-5 | 191 | BF | 223 | DF |
| Macintosh Cyrillic | 143 | 8F | 239 | EF |
