= Es (Cyrillic) =

Cyrillic letter

Es (слово)
- С с

Usage
- Writing system: Cyrillic
- Type: Alphabetic
- Language of origin: Old Church Slavonic
- Sound values: [s], [sʲ] (if followed by е, ё, or ь)
- In Unicode: U+0421, U+0441

History
Development
Aa32
      - Σ
        - Ϲ ϲ
          - С с
- Transliterations: S s

Other
- Associated numbers: 200 (Cyrillic numerals)

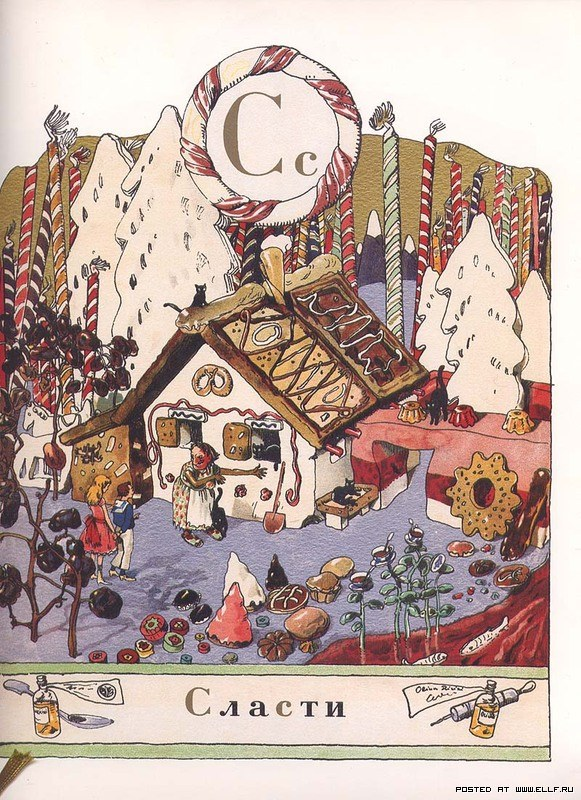
Es, from Alexandre Benois' 1904 alphabet book, with an illustration of sweetness (Slasti)

Es (С с; italics: С с) is a letter of the Cyrillic script.

It commonly represents the voiceless alveolar fricative /s/, like the pronunciation of ⟨s⟩ in "sand".

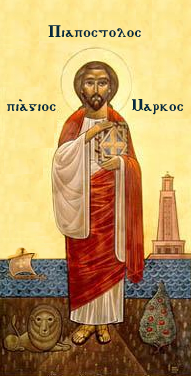
Coptic icon of St. Mark, clearly showing examples of lunate sigma from which the Cyrillic Es was derived

== History ==
The Cyrillic letter Es is derived from a variant of the Greek letter Sigma known as lunate sigma (Ϲ ϲ), in use in the Greek-speaking world in early medieval times. It has no connection to the Latin letter C (C c), which is a descendant of the Greek letter Gamma (Γ γ); however, many languages (for different reasons) apply the value of /s/ to the Latin letter C, especially before front vowels e and i (examples being English, French, Portuguese, Latin American Spanish); see hard and soft C. As its name suggests, Es is related to the Latin S.

The name of Es in the Early Cyrillic alphabet was слово (slovo), meaning "word" or "speech".

In the Cyrillic numeral system, Es had a value of 200.

== Form ==
In the modern Latinized Cyrillic fonts in use today, the Cyrillic letter Es looks exactly like the Latin letter C, being one of six letters in the Cyrillic alphabet that share appearances with Latin alphabet letters but are pronounced differently (or at least differently from the most common pronunciation). This fact has been frequently abused by plagiarism detector circumventors.

== Usage ==
As used in the alphabets of various languages, Es represents the following sounds:

- voiceless alveolar fricative /s/, like the pronunciation of ⟨s⟩ in "sand"
- palatalized voiceless alveolar fricative /sʲ/

The pronunciations shown in the table are the primary ones for each language; for details consult the articles on the languages.

Language	Position in alphabet	Pronunciation
Belarusian	19th	/s/, /sʲ/
Bulgarian	18th	/s/, /sʲ/
Macedonian	22nd	/s/
Russian	19th	/s/, /sʲ/
Serbian	21st	/s/
Ukrainian	22nd	/s/, /sʲ/
Ossetic (Iron)	23rd	/ʃ~s̠/

== Related letters and other similar characters ==
- Σ σ/ς : Greek letter Sigma
- S s : Latin letter S
- Ѕ ѕ : Cyrillic letter Ѕ
- C c : Latin letter C

== Computing codes ==
Character information
Preview	С		с		ᲃ	
Unicode name	CYRILLIC CAPITAL LETTER ES		CYRILLIC SMALL LETTER ES		CYRILLIC SMALL LETTER WIDE ES	
Encodings	decimal	hex	dec	hex	dec	hex
Unicode	1057	U+0421	1089	U+0441	7299	U+1C83
UTF-8	208 161	D0 A1	209 129	D1 81	225 178 131	E1 B2 83
Numeric character reference	&#1057;	&#x421;	&#1089;	&#x441;	&#7299;	&#x1C83;
Named character reference	&Scy;		&scy;			
KOI8-R and KOI8-U	243	F3	211	D3		
Code page 855	228	E4	227	E3		
Windows-1251	209	D1	241	F1		
ISO-8859-5	193	C1	225	E1		
Macintosh Cyrillic	145	91	241	F1		
