= A (Cyrillic) =

Letter of the Cyrillic script

А (Azǔ/Азъ)
- А а
- (See below)

Usage
- Writing system: Cyrillic script
- Type: Alphabetic
- Language of origin: Old Church Slavonic
- Sound values: [a] [ɑ] [ə] [æ] [ä]
- In Unicode: U+0410, U+0430
- Alphabetical position: 1

History
- Development: 𓃾: Α α; Ⰰ; А а
- Time period: ~900 to present
- Sisters: A a Α α א ا ܐ አ Ա ա 𐌀 Ａ ᴀ
- Transliterations: A a (Latin script)
- Variations: (See below)

Other
- Associated numbers: 1
- Writing direction: Left-to-right

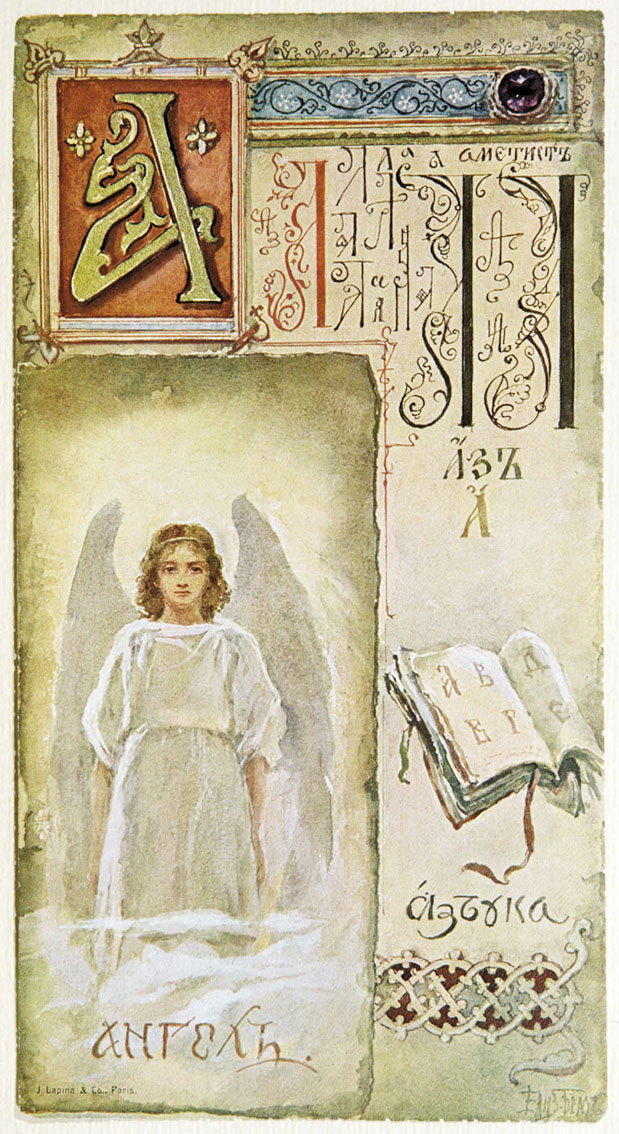
Letter А, page from Elisabeth Boehm's Azbuka

А (А а; italics: А а or А а; italics: А а) is a letter of the Cyrillic script. It commonly represents an open central unrounded vowel /ä/, halfway between the pronunciation of ⟨a⟩ in "cat" and "father". The Cyrillic letter А is romanized using the Latin letter A.

== History ==
The Cyrillic letter А was derived directly from the Greek letter Alpha (Α α). In the Early Cyrillic alphabet its name was азъ (azǔ), meaning the personal pronoun "I". In the Cyrillic numeral system, the Cyrillic letter А has a value of 1.

== Form ==
Throughout history, the Cyrillic letter А has had various shapes, but today is standardized on one that looks exactly like the Latin letter A, including the italic and lower case forms.

== Usage ==
In most languages that use the Cyrillic alphabet – such as Bulgarian, Ukrainian, Belarusian, Russian, Rusyn, Serbian, Macedonian and Montenegrin – the Cyrillic letter А represents the open central unrounded vowel /a/. In Ingush and Chechen, the Cyrillic letter А represents both the open back unrounded vowel /ɑ/ when stressed and the mid-central vowel /ə/ when unstressed. In Turkic languages that use the Cyrillic script it represents the open back unrounded vowel /ɑ/, with the exception of Volga Tatar, in which it represents the open back rounded vowel /ɒ/, and Uzbek, in which it represents the near-open front unrounded vowel /æ/. In languages that contrast vowel length the letter can be written as double vowel.

== Related letters and other similar characters ==
- A a : Latin letter A
- Á á : Latin letter A with acute
- Α α : Greek letter Alpha
- Ă ă : Latin letter A with breve
- Â â : Latin letter A with circumflex
- Ā ā : Latin letter A with macron
- Æ æ : Latin letter Ash
- À à : Latin letter A with grave

== Computing codes ==
А (Cyrillic)
Pronunciation of name of Cyrillic 'А'

- U+0410 А CYRILLIC CAPITAL LETTER A
- U+0430 а CYRILLIC SMALL LETTER A

== See also ==
- Cyrillic characters in Unicode
