= Cyrillic Extended-B =

- Range: U+A640..U+A69F (96 code points)
- Plane: BMP
- Scripts: Cyrillic
- Major alphabets: Old Cyrillic; Old Abkhazian
- Assigned: 96 code points
- Unused: 0 reserved code points

Unicode version history
- 5.1 (2008): 78 (+78)
- 6.0 (2010): 80 (+2)
- 6.1 (2012): 89 (+9)
- 7.0 (2014): 95 (+6)
- 8.0 (2015): 96 (+1)

Unicode documentation
- Code chart ∣ Web page

Cyrillic Extended-B is a Unicode block containing Cyrillic characters for writing Old Cyrillic and Old Abkhazian, and combining numeric signs for Cyrillic numerals used in early Slavic or Church Slavonic texts.

== Block ==
Cyrillic Extended-B^{[1]} Official Unicode Consortium code chart (PDF)
	0	1	2	3	4	5	6	7	8	9	A	B	C	D	E	F
U+A64x	Ꙁ	ꙁ	Ꙃ	ꙃ	Ꙅ	ꙅ	Ꙇ	ꙇ	Ꙉ	ꙉ	Ꙋ	ꙋ	Ꙍ	ꙍ	Ꙏ	ꙏ
U+A65x	Ꙑ	ꙑ	Ꙓ	ꙓ	Ꙕ	ꙕ	Ꙗ	ꙗ	Ꙙ	ꙙ	Ꙛ	ꙛ	Ꙝ	ꙝ	Ꙟ	ꙟ
U+A66x	Ꙡ	ꙡ	Ꙣ	ꙣ	Ꙥ	ꙥ	Ꙧ	ꙧ	Ꙩ	ꙩ	Ꙫ	ꙫ	Ꙭ	ꙭ	ꙮ	꙯
U+A67x	꙰	꙱	꙲	꙳	ꙴ	ꙵ	ꙶ	ꙷ	ꙸ	ꙹ	ꙺ	ꙻ	꙼	꙽	꙾	ꙿ
U+A68x	Ꚁ	ꚁ	Ꚃ	ꚃ	Ꚅ	ꚅ	Ꚇ	ꚇ	Ꚉ	ꚉ	Ꚋ	ꚋ	Ꚍ	ꚍ	Ꚏ	ꚏ
U+A69x	Ꚑ	ꚑ	Ꚓ	ꚓ	Ꚕ	ꚕ	Ꚗ	ꚗ	Ꚙ	ꚙ	Ꚛ	ꚛ	ꚜ	ꚝ	ꚞ	ꚟ
Notes: 1. As of Unicode version 16.0

== History ==
The following Unicode-related documents record the purpose and process of defining specific characters in the Cyrillic Extended-B block:

Version	Final code points (Note: Proposed code points and characters names may differ from final code points and names)	Count	L2 ID	WG2 ID	Document
5.1	U+A640..A65F, A662..A673, A67C..A697	78	L2/06-042		Cleminson, Ralph (2006-01-26), Proposal for additional Cyrillic characters
5.1	U+A640..A65F, A662..A673, A67C..A697	78	L2/06-181		Anderson, Deborah (2006-05-08), Responses to the UTC regarding L2/06-042, Proposal for Additional Cyrillic Characters
5.1	U+A640..A65F, A662..A673, A67C..A697	78	L2/06-359		Cleminson, Ralph (2006-10-31), Proposal for additional Cyrillic characters
5.1	U+A640..A65F, A662..A673, A67C..A697	78	L2/07-003	N3194	Everson, Michael; Birnbaum, David; Cleminson, Ralph; Derzhanski, Ivan; Dorosh, Vladislav; Kryukov, Alexey; Paliga, Sorin; Ruppel, Klaas (2007-01-12), Proposal to encode additional Cyrillic characters in the BMP of the UCS
5.1	U+A640..A65F, A662..A673, A67C..A697	78	L2/07-055		Cleminson, Ralph (2007-01-19), Comments on Additional Cyrillic Characters (L2/07-003 = WG2 N3194)
5.1	U+A640..A65F, A662..A673, A67C..A697	78	L2/07-015		Moore, Lisa (2007-02-08), "Cyrillic (C.13)", UTC #110 Minutes
5.1	U+A640..A65F, A662..A673, A67C..A697	78	L2/07-118R2		Moore, Lisa (2007-05-23), "111-C17", UTC #111 Minutes
5.1	U+A640..A65F, A662..A673, A67C..A697	78	L2/07-268	N3253 (pdf, doc)	Umamaheswaran, V. S. (2007-07-26), "M50.11", Unconfirmed minutes of WG 2 meeting 50, Frankfurt-am-Main, Germany; 2007-04-24/27
5.1	U+A640..A65F, A662..A673, A67C..A697	78	L2/22-002	N5170	Everson, Michael (2022-01-09), Proposal to revise the glyph of CYRILLIC LETTER MULTIOCULAR O [U+A66E]
5.1	U+A640..A65F, A662..A673, A67C..A697	78	L2/22-023		Anderson, Deborah; Whistler, Ken; Pournader, Roozbeh; Constable, Peter (2022-01-22), "1a. Cyrillic Letter Multiocular O", Recommendations to UTC #170 January 2022 on Script Proposals
5.1	U+A640..A65F, A662..A673, A67C..A697	78	L2/22-016		Constable, Peter (2022-04-21), "Consensus 170-C5", UTC #170 Minutes, "Approve a glyph change for U+A66E CYRILLIC LETTER MULTIOCULAR O from a 7-eyed glyph to a 10-eyed glyph for a change in Unicode 15.0."
6.0	U+A660..A661	2	L2/09-003R		Moore, Lisa (2009-02-12), "B.15.4", UTC #118 / L2 #215 Minutes
6.0	U+A660..A661	2	L2/09-020R	N3563R	Cleminson, Ralph; Everson, Michael (2009-03-13), Proposal to encode two Cyrillic characters in the BMP of the UCS
6.0	U+A660..A661	2	L2/09-234	N3603 (pdf, doc)	Umamaheswaran, V. S. (2009-07-08), "M54.13a", Unconfirmed minutes of WG 2 meeting 54
6.1	U+A674..A67B, A69F	9	L2/10-002	N3748	Everson, Michael; Baranov, Victor; Miklas, Heinz; Rabus, Achim (2010-01-25), Proposal to encode nine Cyrillic characters for Slavonic
6.1	U+A674..A67B, A69F	9	L2/10-015R		Moore, Lisa (2010-02-09), "C.12", UTC #122 / L2 #219 Minutes
6.1	U+A674..A67B, A69F	9		N3803 (pdf, doc)	"M56.08d", Unconfirmed minutes of WG 2 meeting no. 56, 2010-09-24
7.0	U+A698..A69B	4	L2/09-310R	N3772	Shardt, Yuri; Andreev, Aleksandr (2009-08-18), Proposal to Encode the Typikon Symbols in Unicode
7.0	U+A698..A69B	4	L2/11-016		Moore, Lisa (2011-02-15), "C.3.1", UTC #126 / L2 #223 Minutes
7.0	U+A698..A69B	4	L2/10-394R	N3974	Shardt, Yuri; Simmons, Nikita; Andreev, Aleksandr (2011-02-25), Proposal to Encode Some Outstanding Early Cyrillic Characters in Unicode
7.0	U+A698..A69B	4	L2/11-127		Anderson, Deborah (2011-05-12), Suggested Collation for Cyrillic O's (U+A698 - U+69B) from L2/10-394R
7.0	U+A698..A69B	4		N4103	"11.2.14 Some outstanding early Cyrillic characters", Unconfirmed minutes of WG 2 meeting 58, 2012-01-03
7.0	U+A69C..A69D	2	L2/10-357	N3914	Proposal to add characters used in Lithuanian dialectology to the UCS, 2010-10-29
7.0	U+A69C..A69D	2	L2/11-135		Tumasonis, Vladas; Pentzlin, Karl (2011-05-02), Revised proposal to add characters used in Lithuanian dialectology
7.0	U+A69C..A69D	2	L2/11-189		Whistler, Ken; Constable, Peter (2011-05-11), Review of Characters for Lithuanian Dialectology
7.0	U+A69C..A69D	2	L2/11-191	N4062	Constable, Peter; Whistler, Ken (2011-05-13), USNB Comments on N3914 -Characters for Lithuanian Dialectology
7.0	U+A69C..A69D	2	L2/11-116		Moore, Lisa (2011-05-17), "Consensus 127-C12", UTC #127 / L2 #224 Minutes, "Accept 14 characters for Lithuanian dialectology..."
7.0	U+A69C..A69D	2	L2/11-223	N4070	Tumasonis, Vladas; Pentzlin, Karl (2011-05-24), Second revised proposal to add characters used in Lithuanian dialectology to the UCS
7.0	U+A69C..A69D	2	L2/11-248	N4116	Pentzlin, Karl (2011-06-09), Report on the ad hoc re "Lithuanian dialectology" (SC2/WG2 N4070) held during the SC2/WG2 meeting at Helsinki
7.0	U+A69C..A69D	2		N4103	"11.1.3 Lithuanian dialectology", Unconfirmed minutes of WG 2 meeting 58, 2012-01-03
8.0	U+A69E	1	L2/13-008	N4390	Andreev, Aleksandr; Shardt, Yuri; Simmons, Nikita (2013-01-21), Proposal to Encode An Outstanding Early Cyrillic Character
8.0	U+A69E	1	L2/13-011		Moore, Lisa (2013-02-04), "C.5", UTC #134 Minutes
8.0	U+A69E	1		N4403 (pdf, doc)	Umamaheswaran, V. S. (2014-01-28), "10.3.4 One Slavonic Cyrillic character", Unconfirmed minutes of WG 2 meeting 61, Holiday Inn, Vilnius, Lithuania; 2013-06-10/14
