= Romanian Cyrillic alphabet =

1500s–1860s alphabet used to write Romanian

Romanian Cyrillic
- Script type: Alphabet
- Period: 14th–19th centuries (Note: Earlist known usage dated back to 1521 Neacșu's letter.)
- Languages: Romanian

Related scripts
- Parent systems: Phoenician alphabet: Greek alphabet; Glagolitic alphabet; Cyrillic; Romanian Cyrillic
- Sister systems: Early Cyrillic alphabet

The Romanian Cyrillic alphabet is the Cyrillic alphabet that was used to write the Romanian language and Church Slavonic as early as the 14th century, and used until the early 1860s, when it began to be gradually replaced by a Latin-based Romanian alphabet. Cyrillic remained in occasional use until the 1920s, mostly in Russian-ruled Bessarabia.

From the 1860s until the full adoption of the Latin alphabet, the Romanian transitional alphabet was in place, combining Cyrillic and Latin letters, and including some of the Latin letters with diacritics that remain in the modern Romanian alphabet. The Romanian Orthodox Church continued using the alphabet in its publications until 1881.

The Romanian Cyrillic alphabet is not the same as the Moldovan Cyrillic alphabet (which is based on the modern Russian alphabet) that was used in the Moldavian SSR for most of the Soviet era and that is still used in Transnistria.

== Orthography ==
The orthographic rules for the Romanian Cyrillic script were relatively inconsistent, especially differing from region to region.

Some of the more common (especially in the late 18th century) standards include:

1. 'ь' is placed at the end of words ending in a consonant. It represents the archaic Romanian "short asyllabic final u sound", which was denoted with 'ꙋ' or 'ꙋ꙼' in some older texts. 'ь' was eventually dropped to reduce printing cost.
2. The breve mark is used to mark a vowel as short, such as with 'й' and 'Ꙋ꙼' which are not considered separate from 'и' and 'ꙋ' respectively.
3. Є, Ѻ, Оу and Ꙗ are the initial variants of Е, О, Ꙋ, Ѧ respectively.
4. І is the equivalent of И before a vowel. It is also used in Greek loanwords and proper names.
5. Ꙟ serves as the word initial equivalent of ѫ. It can represent the sounds /ɨn/ and /ɨm/ as well.
6. Ѯ Ѱ Ѳ Ѵ are only used in Greek loanwords.
7. Ѵ usually represents the sounds /i/ when proceeding a consonant and /v/ when proceeding a vowel. Although educated speakers likely pronounced it as /y/.
8. 'іꙋ' or iotated ꙋ may be used in place of 'ю' in proper names.
1. 'ꙍ' can be used as a variation of 'ѻ' as well as replacing 'o' when stressed. It also appears in the endings of words in the genitive and dative. It rarely represents the diphthong /o̯a/ more often representing the diphthong /ŭə/.

== Table of correspondence ==
The Romanian Cyrillic alphabet was close to the contemporary version of the Early Cyrillic alphabet of the Church Slavonic liturgical language.

Letter	Numerical value	Romanian Latin equivalent	Transitional alphabet	Moldovan Cyrillic equivalent	Phoneme	Romanian name	Slavonic equiv. name
А а	1	a	A a	а	/a/	az	азъ (azŭ)
Б б		b	Б б	б	/b/	buche	бꙋкꙑ (buky)
В в	2	v	В в	в	/v/	vede	вѣдѣ (vĕdĕ)
Г г	3	gh (before e, i) g (elsewhere)	G g	г	/ɡ/	glagol	глаголи (glagoli)
Д д	4	d	D d	д	/d/	dobru	добро (dobro)
Є є, Е е (Note: Initial vs. non-initial shapes: Є/Е, Ѻ/О, Оу/Ꙋ, Ꙗ/Ѧ.)	5	e	E e	е	/e/	est	єстъ (estŭ)
Ж ж		j	Ж ж	ж	/ʒ/	juvete	живѣтє (živěte)
Ѕ ѕ	6	dz	Ḑ ḑ	дз	/d͡z/	zalu	ꙃѣло (dzělo)
З з	7	z	Z z	з	/z/	zemle	зємл҄ꙗ (zemlja)
И и	8	i	I i	и	/i/	ije	ижє (iže)
Й й (Note: Й is hardly a separate letter of the alphabet; the letters І, Ю, Ȣ and Ѡ also accept a brevity sign.)		i	Ĭ ĭ	й	/j/, /ʲ/	ije	ижє (iže)
І і (Note: In loanwords of Greek origin (or ones adopted through the Greek language), letters И and І correspond to eta and iota, respectively. In the words of Romanian origin and in Slavic loanwords, their usage follows Bulgarian alphabet, namely, І before vowels, otherwise И.) (Note: In earlier documents, Ї was preferred if no any other diacritic accepted.)	10	i	I i	и	/i/	i	и (i)
К к	20	ch (before e, i) c (elsewhere)	К к or K k	к	/k/	kaku	како (kako)
Л л	30	l	Л л	л	/l/	liude	людиѥ (ljudije)
М м	40	m	M m	м	/m/	mislete	мꙑслитє (myslite)
Н н	50	n	N n	н	/n/	naș	нашь (našĭ)
Ѻ ѻ, О о	70	o	O o	о	/o̯/	on	онъ (onŭ)
П п	80	p	П п	п	/p/	pocoi	покои (pokoi)
Р р	100	r	Р р	р	/r/	râță	рьци (rĭci)
С с	200	s	S s	с	/s/	slovă	слово (slovo)
Т т	300	t	T t	т	/t/	tferdu	тврьдо (tvrĭdo)
ОУ оу	400	u	Ꙋ ꙋ (Ȣ, ȣ, ɣ)	у	/u/	upsilon	ꙋкъ (ukŭ)
Оу Ȣ, У Ȣ		u	Ꙋ ꙋ (Ȣ, ȣ, ɣ)	у	/u/	ucu	ꙋкъ (ukŭ)
Ф ф	500	f	F f	ф	/f/	fârta	фрьтъ (frĭtŭ)
Х х	600	h	Х х	х	/h/	heru	хѣръ (xěrŭ)
Ѡ ѡ (Note: The distinction of Ѡ and О is present not only in loanwords, but in Romanian words as well.)	800	o	O o	о	/o/	omega	отъ (otŭ)
Щ щ		șt	Щ щ	шт	/ʃt/	ștea	ща (šta)
Ц ц	900	ț	Ц ц	ц	/t͡s/	ți	ци
Ч ч	90	c (before e, i) ci (elsewhere)	Ч ч	ч	/t͡ʃ/	cervu	чрьвь (črĭvĭ)
Ш ш		ș	Ш ш	ш	/ʃ/	șa	ша (ša)
Ъ ъ		ă, ŭ (Note: Letters ĭ and ŭ represent a barely spoken/heard i or u.)	Ъ ъ	э	/ə/	ier	ѥръ (jerŭ)
Ы ы, Ꙑ ꙑ		â, î	Î î	ы	/ɨ/	ierî	ѥрꙑ (jery)
Ь ь		ă, ŭ, ĭ	Ꙋ̆ ꙋ̆	ь	—	ieri	ѥрь (jerĭ)
Ѣ ѣ		ea	Ea ea	я	/e̯a/	eati(u)	ѣть (ětĭ)
Ю ю		iu	Ĭꙋ ĭꙋ	ю	/ju/	io / iu	ю (ju)
Ꙗ ꙗ		ia	Ĭa ĭa	я	/ja/	ia	ꙗ (ja)
Ѥ ѥ		ie	Ĭe ĭe	ие	/je/		ѥ (je)
Ѧ ѧ		ĭa, ea	Ĭa ĭa, Ea ea	я	/ja/	ia	ѧсъ (ęsŭ)
Ѫ ѫ		î	Î î	ы	/ɨ/	ius	ѫсъ (ǫsŭ)
Ѯ ѯ (Note: Letters Ѯ, Ѱ, Ѳ and Ѵ are used for copying Greek spelling of loanwords (especially for names and toponyms).)	60	x	Ks ks	кс	/ks/	csi	ѯи (ksi)
Ѱ ѱ	700	ps	Пs пs	пс	/ps/	psi	ѱи (psi)
Ѳ ѳ	9	th, ft	T t, Ft ft	т, фт	/t/ and approx. /θ/ or /f/	thita	фита (fita)
Ѵ ѵ	400	i, u	I i; Ꙋ ꙋ	и, у	/i/, /y/, /v/	ijița	ижица (ižica)
Ꙟ ꙟ, ↑ ↑		în îm	În în Îm îm	ын, ым	/ɨn/, /ɨm/	în	
Џ џ		g (before e, i) gi (elsewhere)	Џ џ	ӂ	/d͡ʒ/	gea	

== Unregulated transitional alphabets ==
Starting with the 1830s and ending with the official adoption of the Latin alphabet, there were no regulations for writing Romanian, and various alphabets using Cyrillic and Latin letters, besides the mid-transitional version in the table above, were used, sometimes two or more of them in a single book. The following table shows some of the many alphabets used in print.

Pre-1830	1833	1838	1846 (1)	1846 (2)	1848	1858	1860
А а	А а	А а	А а	А а	А а	A a	A a
Б б	Б б	Б б	Б б	Б б	Б б	B b	Б б
В в	В в	В в	В в	В в	В в	V v	В в
Г г	Г г	Г г	Г г	Г г	Г г	G g	Г г
Д д	Д д	Д д	D d	Д д	D d	D d	D d
Є є, Е e	Є є	Є є	E e	E ɛ	E e	E e	E e
Ж ж	Ж ж	Ж ж	Ж ж	Ж ж	Ж ж	J j	Ж ж
Ѕ ѕ	Ѕ ѕ	Дз дз	Ḑ ḑ	Дз дз	Dz dz	Dz dz	Dz dz
З з	З з	З з	Z z	З з	Z z	Z z	Z z
И и	И и	I i	I i	І і	I i	I i	I i
І і	Ї ї	I i	I i	І і	I i	I i	I i
К к	К к	К к	K k	К к	К к	K k	K k
Л л	Л л	Л л	Л л	Л л	Л л	L l	L l
М м	М м	М м	M m	М м	M m	M m	M m
Н н	Н н	Н н	N n	N ɴ	N n	N n	N n
Ѻ ѻ, О o	О о	О о	O o	О о	О о	О о	O о
П п	П п	П п	П п	П п	П п	П п	П п
Р р	Р р	Р р	Р р	Р р	Р р	R r	Р р
С с	С с	С с	S s	С с	С с	S s	S s
Т т	Т т	Т т	T t	Т т	Т т	T t	T t
Оу оу	У у (initial) Ꙋ ꙋ (mid and final)	Ȣ ȣ	Ȣ ȣ	Ȣ ȣ	Ȣ ȣ	Ȣ ȣ	Ȣ ȣ
Ꙋ, ȣ	У у (initial) Ꙋ ꙋ (mid and final)	Ȣ ȣ	Ȣ ȣ	Ȣ ȣ	Ȣ ȣ	Ȣ ȣ	Ȣ ȣ
Ф ф	Ф ф	Ф ф	Ф ф	Ф ф	Ф ф	F f	Ф ф
Х х	Х х	Х х	Х х	Х х	Х х	Х х	Х х
Ѡ ѡ	Ѡ ѡ (Note: -лѡр only)	О о	O o	О о	O o	О о	О о
Щ щ	Щ щ	Щ щ	Щ щ	Шт шт	Щ щ	Шt шt	Шt шt
Ц ц	Ц ц	Ц ц	Ц ц	Ц ц	Ц ц	Ц ц	Ц ц
Ч ч	Ч ч	Ч ч	Ч ч	Ч ч	Ч ч	Ч ч	Ч ч
Ш ш	Ш ш	Ш ш	Ш ш	Ш ш	Ш ш	Ш ш	Ш ш
Ъ ъ	Ъ ъ	Ъ ъ	Ъ ъ	Ъ ъ	Ъ ъ	Ъ ъ	Ъ ъ
Ы ы	Ꙟ ꙟ (initial); Ѫ ѫ (mid and final)	Ꙟ ꙟ (initial); Ѫ ѫ (mid and final)	Ꙟ ꙟ	Ꙟ ꙟ / Î î (transitional form)	Ꙟ ꙟ (initial); Ѫ ѫ (mid and final)	Î î	Î î
Ѣ ѣ	Ѣ ѣ	Ѣ ѣ	Ea ea	Eа εа (ligature, small letter only)	Ea ea	Ea ea	Ea ea
Ю ю	Ю ю	IꙊ iꙋ (ligature)	IȢ Iȣ iȣ (ligature)	IȢ Iȣ іȣ (ligature, small letter only)	IȢ iȣ	IȢ iȣ (ligature)	ĬȢ ĭȣ
Ꙗ ꙗ	Ꙗ ꙗ (initial); Ѧ ѧ (mid and final)	Ꙗ ꙗ	Ꙗ Iа (ligature) ꙗ	IА Iа ꙗ	Ia ia	Ĭa ĭa	Ĭa ĭa
Ѥ ѥ	Йє йє	Ĭe ĭe	Ĭe ĭe	Ĭε ĭε	Ie ie	Ĭe ĭe	Ĭe ĭe
Ѧ ѧ	Ꙗ ꙗ (initial); Ѧ ѧ (mid and final)	Ꙗ ꙗ	Ꙗ Iа (ligature) ꙗ	IА Iа ꙗ	Ia ia	Ĭa ĭa	Ĭa ĭa
Ѫ ѫ	Ꙟ ꙟ (initial); Ѫ ѫ (mid and final)	Ꙟ ꙟ (initial); Ѫ ѫ (mid and final)	Ꙟ ꙟ	Ꙟ ꙟ / Î î (transitional form)	Ꙟ ꙟ (initial); Ѫ ѫ (mid and final)	Î î	Î î
Ѯ ѯ	Кс кс	Кс кс	Ks ks	Кс кс	Кс кс	Ks ks	Ks ks
Ѱ ѱ	Пс пс	Пс пс	Пs пs	Пс пс	Пс пс	Пs пs	Пs пs
Ѳ ѳ	Т т	Т т	T t	Ѳ ѳ	Т т	T t	T t
Ѵ ѵ	И, Ꙋ	I, Ꙋ	I, ȣ	І, ȣ	І, ȣ	I, ȣ	I, ȣ
Ꙟ ꙟ	Ꙟн ꙟн Ꙟм ꙟм	Ꙟн ꙟн Ꙟм ꙟм	Ꙟн ꙟн Ꙟм ꙟм	Ꙟɴ ꙟɴ Ꙟм ꙟм	Ꙟn ꙟn Ꙟm ꙟm	În în Îm îm	În în Îm îm
Џ џ	Џ џ	Џ џ	Џ џ	Џ џ	Џ џ	Џ џ	Џ џ

== Example of Romanian Cyrillic text ==
According to a document from the 1850s, this is how the Romanian Lord's Prayer looked in Cyrillic script. Transcriptional values correspond to the above table.

Та́тъль нѡ́стрꙋ	Tatăl nostru
Та́тъль но́стрꙋ ка́реле є҆́щй ꙟ҆ че́рюрй: сфн҃цѣ́скъсе нꙋ́меле тъ́ꙋ: Ві́е ꙟ҆пъръці́ѧ та̀: Фі́е во́ѧ та̀, пре кꙋ́мь ꙟ҆ че́рю, шѝ пре пъмѫ́нть. Пѫ́йнѣ ноа́стръ, чѣ̀ де то́ате зи́леле, дъ́неѡ но́аѡ а҆́стъзй. Шѝ не ꙗ҆́ртъ но́аѡ даторі́йле ноа́стре, пре кꙋ́мь шѝ но́й є҆ртъ́мь дато́рничилѡрь но́щрй. Шѝ нꙋ́ не дꙋ́че пе но́й ꙟ҆ и҆спи́тъ. Чѝ не и҆збъвѣще де че́ль ръ́ꙋ. Къ а҆та̀ ꙗ҆́сте ꙟ҆пъръці́ѧ, шѝ Пꙋтѣ́рѣ, шѝ мъри́рѣ ꙟ҆ вѣ́чй, а҆ми́нь.	Tatăl nostru, carele ești în ceriuri, sfințească-se numele tău: Vie împărăția ta: Fie voia ta, pre cum în ceriu, și pre pământ. Pâinea noastră, cea de toate zilele, dăneo noua astăzi. Și ne iartă noua datoriile noastre, pre cum și noi iertăm datornicilor noștri. Și nu ne duce pe noi în ispită. Ci ne izbăveaște de cel rău. Că ata iaste împărăția, și Putearea, și mărirea în veaci, amin.

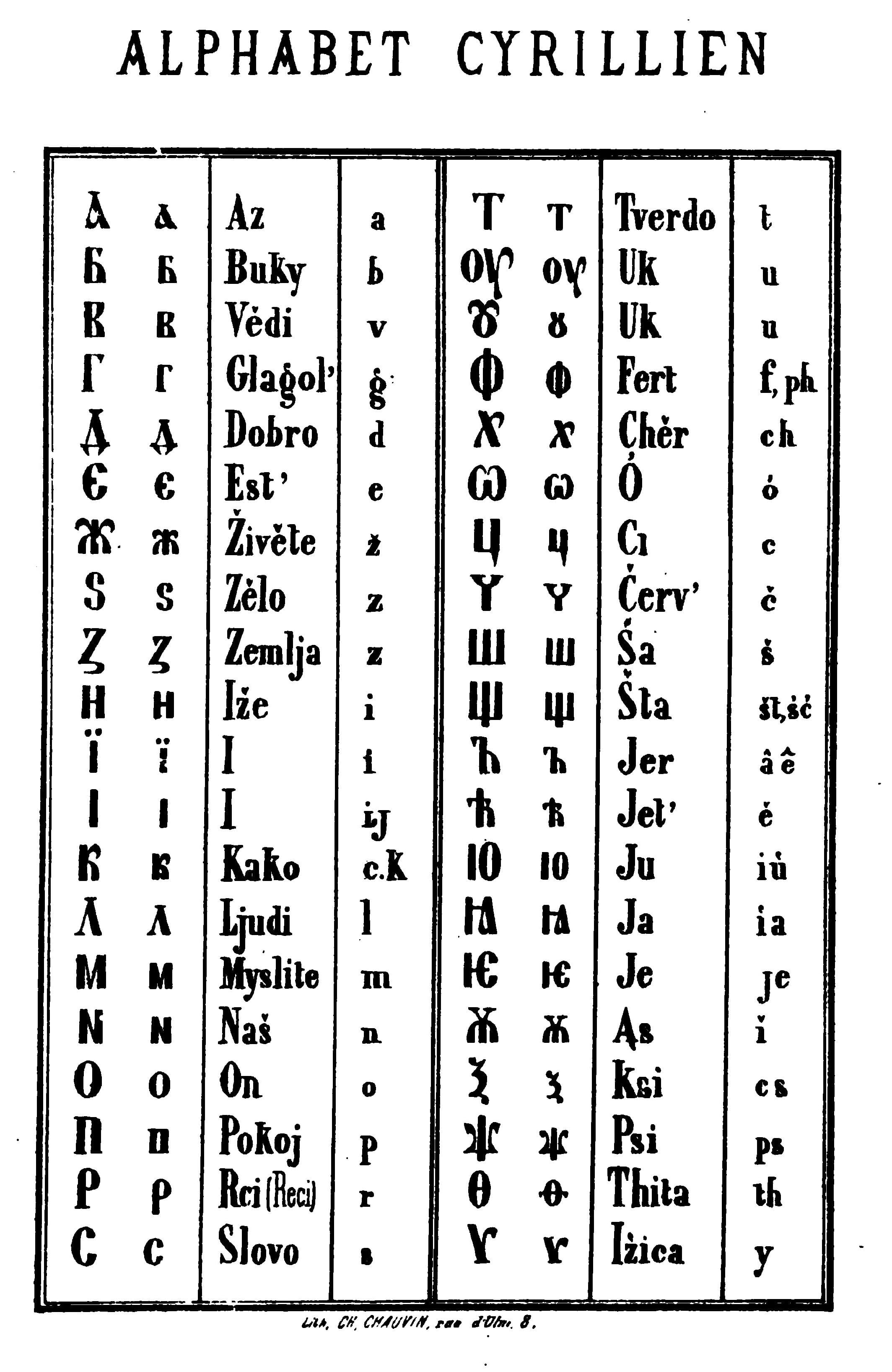
Early 19th century Romanian Cyrillic alphabet (Alecsandri, 1863)

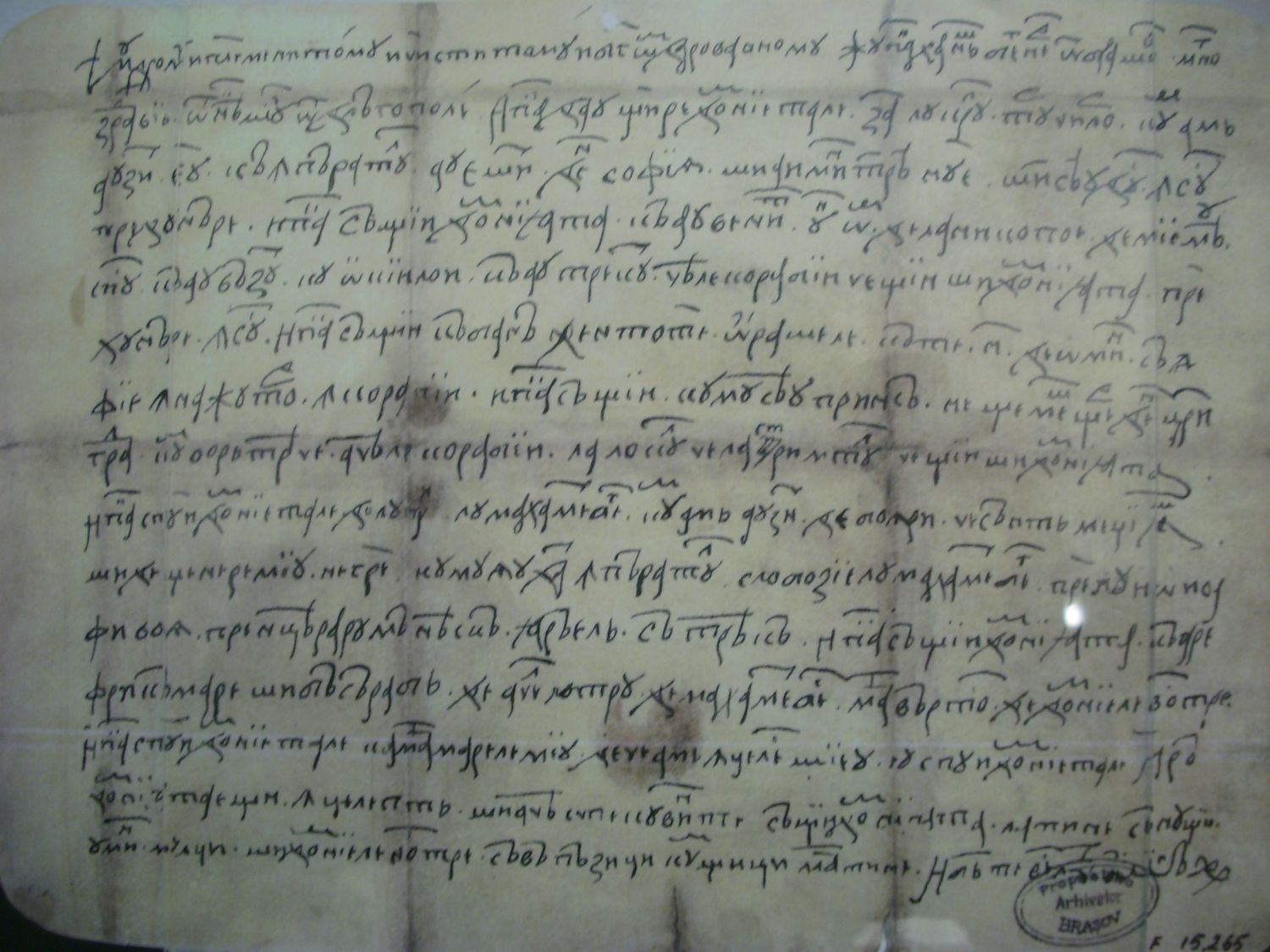
One of the oldest surviving documents in Romanian: Neacșu's Letter, a trader from Câmpulung, sent to the mayor of Brașov (1521)

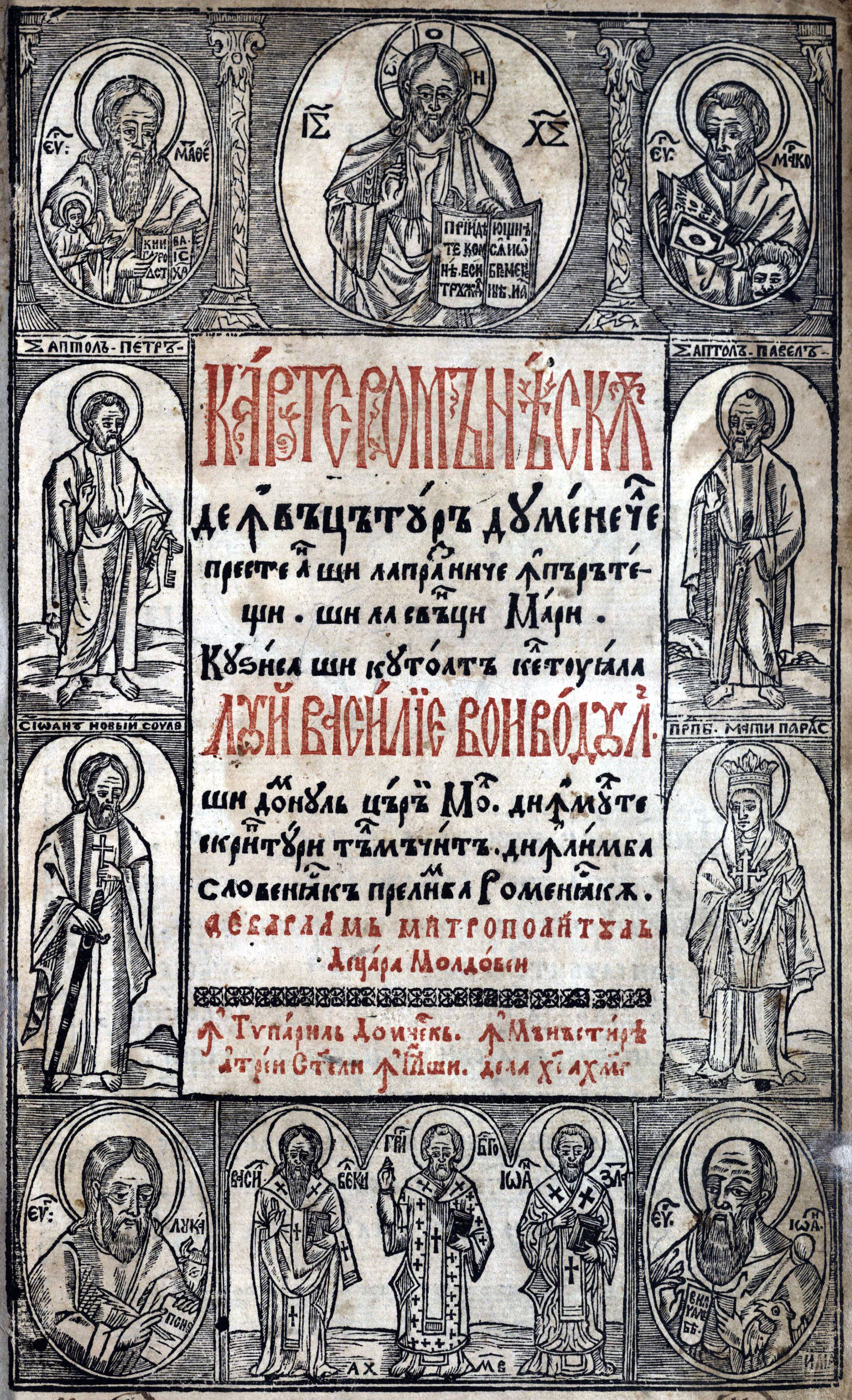
Title page of Carte Romănească de Învățătură (Varlaam Moțoc, 1643)

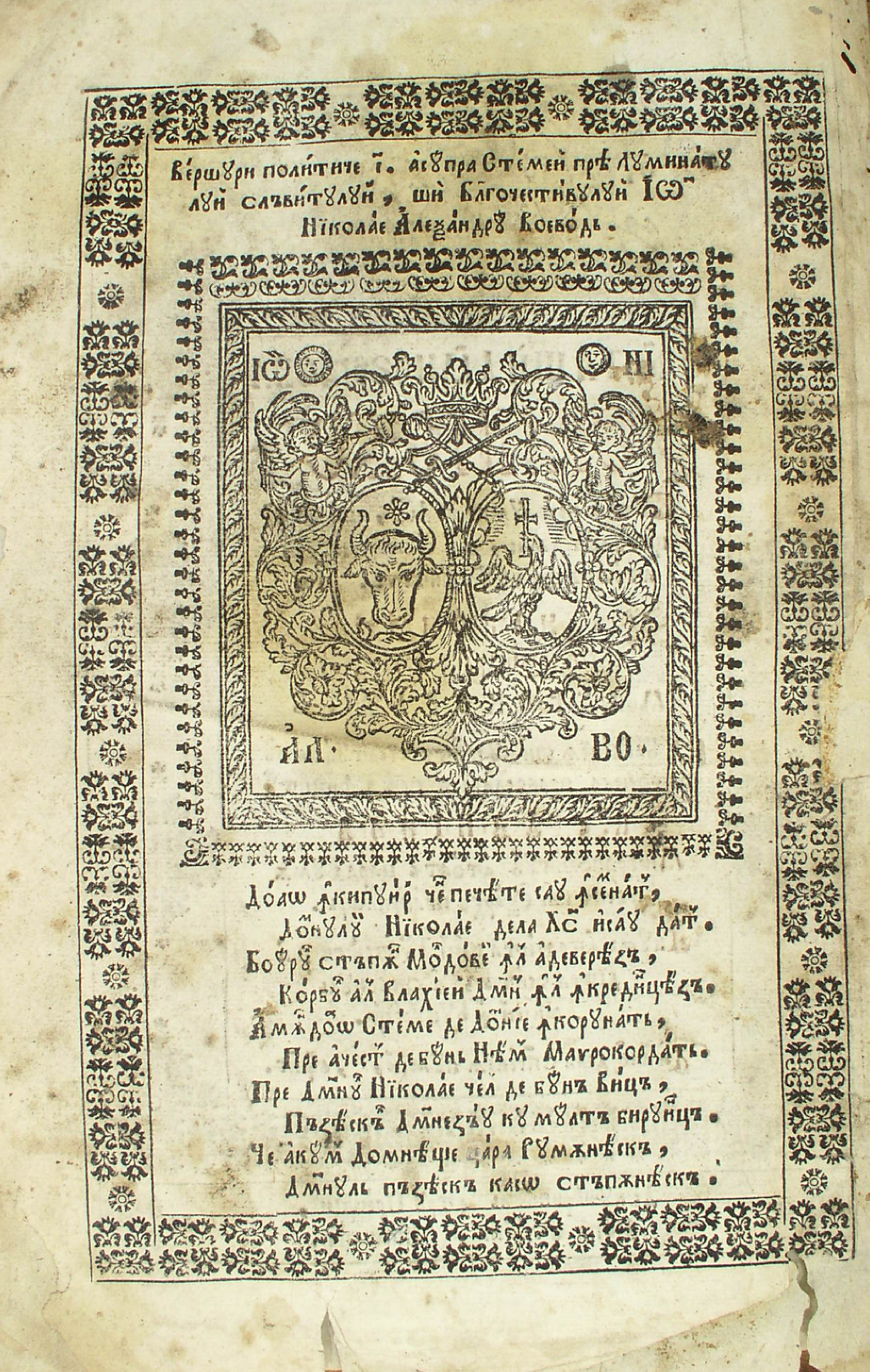
A page of the Gospel Book printed in Bucharest (1723)

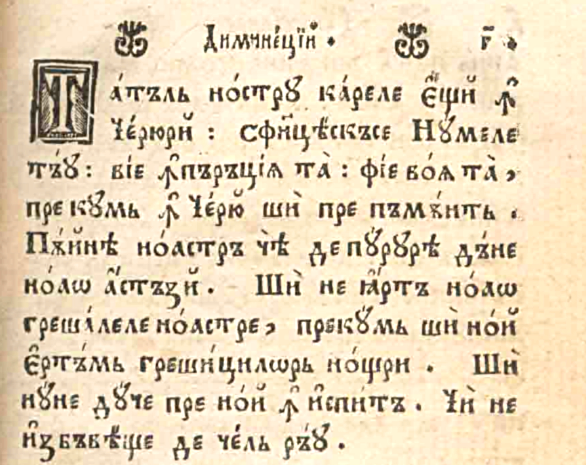
The Lord's Prayer, in a 1786 religious document

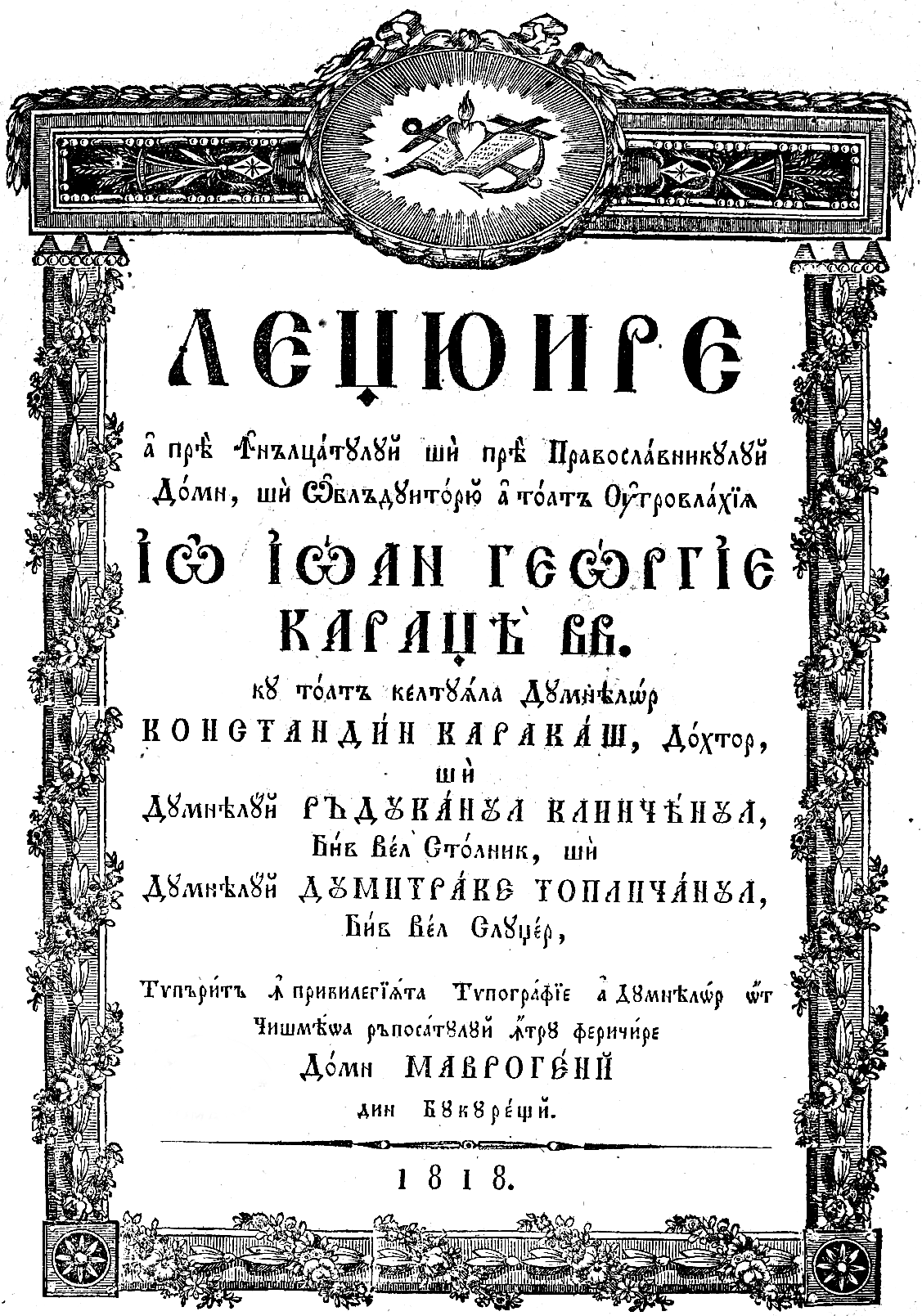
Title page of Legiuirea lui Caragea, a legal code of Wallachia (1818)

First edition of Gazeta de Transilvania (1838)

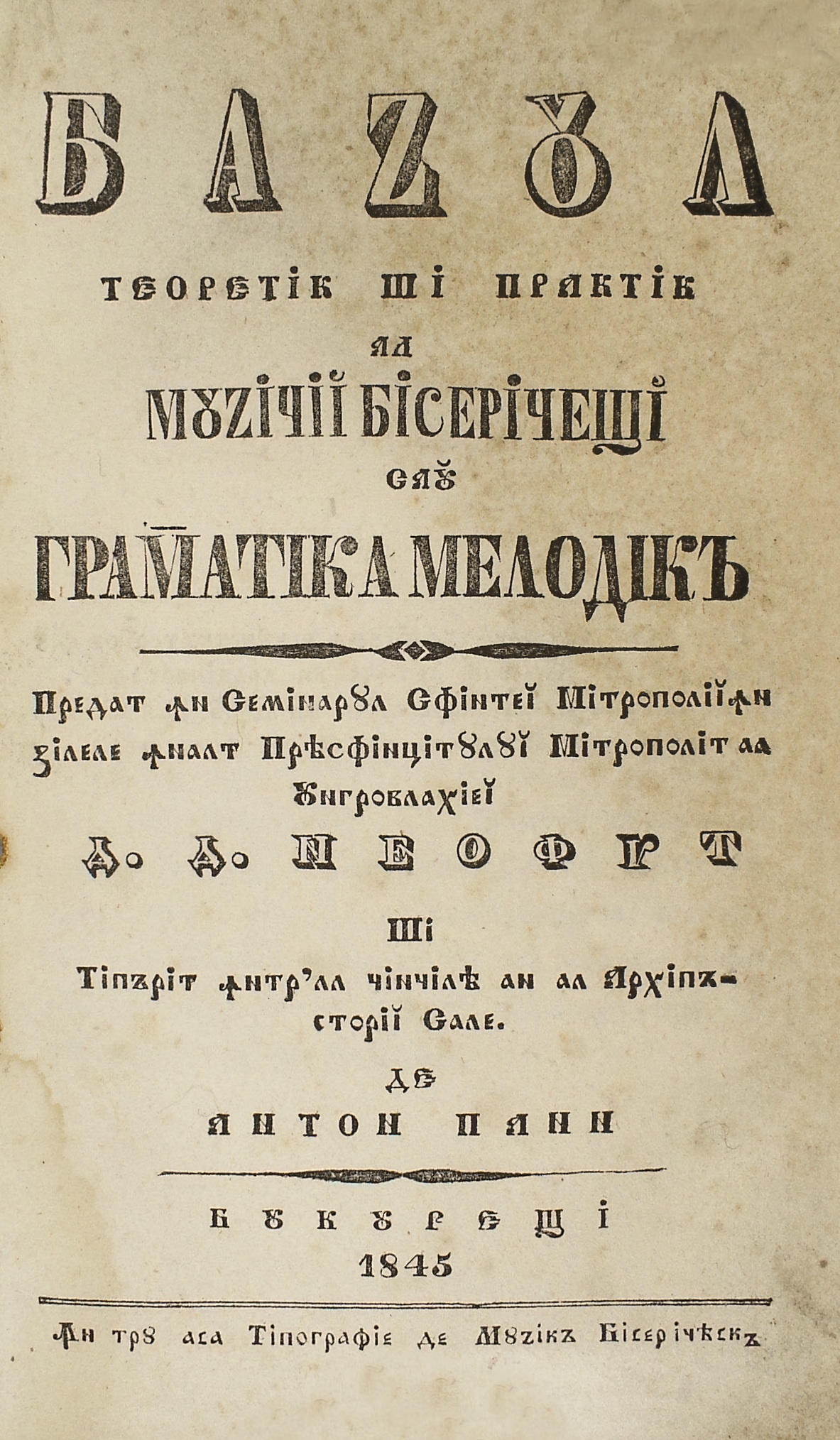
Title page of The Theoretical and Practical Basis of Church music or the Melodic Grammar (Anton Pann, 1845)

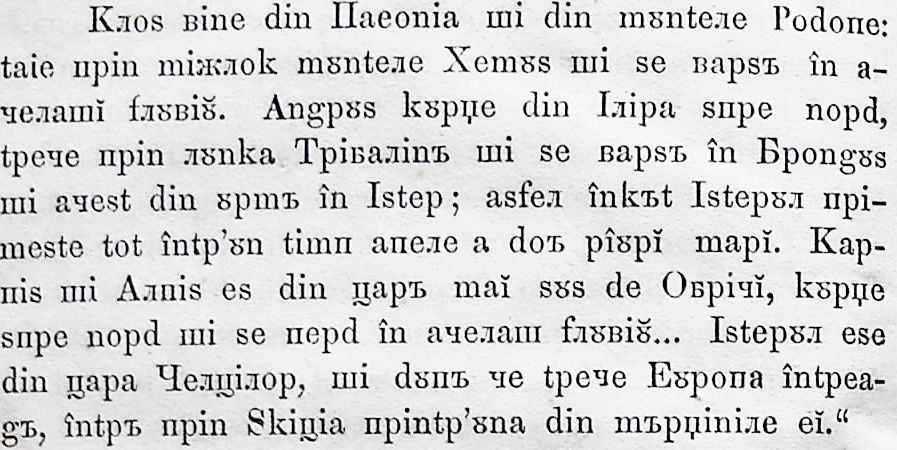
Transitional alphabet (fragment of Dimitrie Bolintineanu's Călătorii pe Dunăre și în Bulgaria, 1858)

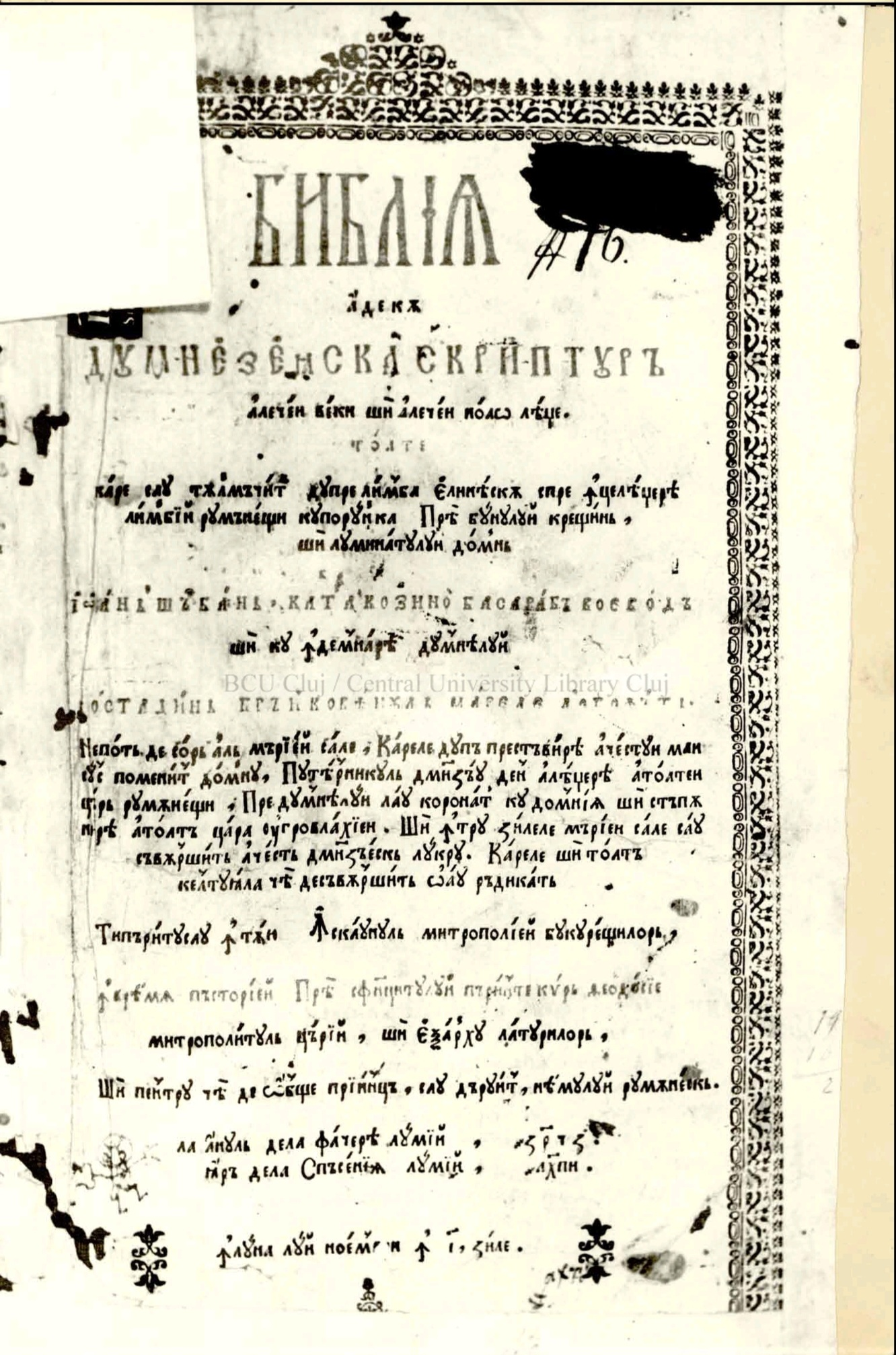
The title page of the Cantacuzino Bible, the first complete translation of the Bible into Romanian (1688).

== See also ==
- Early Cyrillic alphabet
- Moldovan Cyrillic alphabet
- Romanian alphabet
