= Iotated uk =

Cyrillic letter

Iotated Uk

Usage
- Writing system: Cyrillic
- Type: Alphabetic
- Sound values: [ju]

Iotated uk is an Iotated version of the archaic Cyrillic monograph Uk. It was mostly used between the late 1830s and 1850s as part of the unregulated transitional alphabets of Romanian Cyrillic.

== Usage ==
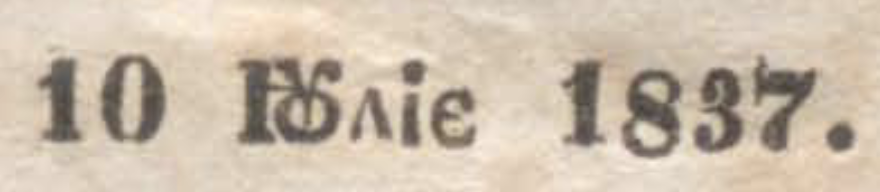
« 10 Iulie 1837 » (July 10 1837) with iotated uk, in the Romanian Cyrillic script.

It was sometimes used in place of the cyrillic letter yu (Ю ю) in the Romanian cyrillic script.

In initial position or for titular use it may also be written using the non monograph version of uk like so: "Юу". Note that the non monograph iotated uk is considered to be two separate glyphs used together to represent a single sound.

== Computing codes ==
This letter has not yet been encoded in Unicode.

== See also ==
- Ѹ ѹ: Cyrillic letter Uk
- Romanian Cyrillic
- Cyrillic script
