= Iotation =

Type of sound change in Slavic languages

In Slavic languages, iotation (/joʊˈteɪʃən/ yoh-TAY-shən or /ˌaɪ.oʊˈteɪʃən/ EYE-oh-TAY-shən) is a form of palatalization that occurs when a consonant comes into contact with the palatal approximant /j/ from the succeeding phoneme. The /j/ is represented by iota (ι) in the early Cyrillic alphabet and the Greek alphabet on which it is based. For example, ni in English onion has the sound of iotated n. Iotation is a phenomenon distinct from Slavic first palatalization in which only the front vowels are involved, but the final result is similar.

== Sound change ==
Iotation occurs when a labial (/m/, /b/), dental (/n/, /s/, /l/) or velar (/k/, /ɡ/, /x/) consonant comes into contact with an iotated vowel, i.e. one preceded by a palatal glide /j/. As a result, the consonant becomes partially or completely palatalized. In many Slavic languages, iotated consonants are called "soft" and the process of iotation is called "softening".

Iotation can result in a partial palatalization so the centre of the tongue is raised during, and sometimes after, the articulation of the consonant. There can also be a complete sound change to a palatal or alveolo-palatal consonant. This table summarizes the typical outcomes in the modern Slavic languages:

Labial			Dental/alveolar			Velar/Glottal		
origin	partial	complete	origin	partial	complete	origin	partial	complete
p	pʲ	pj, pʎ	t	tʲ	c, tɕ, tʃ	k	kʲ	c, tɕ, tʃ
b	bʲ	bj, bʎ	d	dʲ	ɟ, dʑ, dʒ	ɡ	ɡʲ	ɟ, dʑ, dʒ
f	fʲ	fj, fʎ	s	sʲ	ɕ, ʃ	x	xʲ	ç, ɕ, ʃ
v	vʲ	vj, vʎ	z	zʲ	ʑ, ʒ	ɣ	ɣʲ	ʝ, ʑ, ʒ
m	mʲ	mj, mʎ, mɲ	n	nʲ	ɲ	h	hʲ	ç, ɕ
			l	lʲ	ʎ	ɦ	ɦʲ	ʝ, ʑ

According to most scholars, the period of iotation started approximately in the 5th century, in the era of Proto-Slavic, and it lasted for several centuries, probably into the late Common Slavic dialect differentiation. Here is an example from the early stage:

- Proto-Slavic *kĭasĭa/кьасьа > Russian, Ukrainian, Macedonian, Bulgarian, Serbian чаша (čaša), Czech číše, Croatian čaša

== Orthography ==
=== Iotated vowels ===
In Slavic languages, iotated vowels are preceded by a palatal approximant /j/ before a vowel, at the beginning of a word, or between two vowels in the middle of a word, creating a diphthongoid, a partial diphthong. In the Greek alphabet, the consonant is represented by iota (ι). For example, the English apple is cognate to Russian яблоко (jabloko), both come from Proto-Indo-European: *h₂ébōl. As a result of the phenomenon, no native Slavic root starts with an [e] or an [a] but only with a [je] and [ja]; although other vowels are possible. An exception to this is Bulgarian, which has lost iotation for all front vowels (compared to Russian or Polish, who lost it only before [i]).

As it was invented for the writing of Slavic languages, the original Cyrillic alphabet has relatively complex ways for representing iotation by devoting an entire class of letters to deal with the issue. There are letters which represent iotated vowels; the same letters also palatalize preceding consonants (with or without self-iotation), which is why iotation and palatalization are often mixed up. There are also two special letters (soft sign Ь and hard sign Ъ) that also induce iotation; in addition, Ь palatalizes preceding consonant, allowing combinations of both palatalized (soft) and plain (hard) consonants with [j]. Originally, these letters produced short vowels [i] and [u]. The exact use depends on the language.

The adjective for a phone which undergoes iotation is iotated. The adjective for a letter formed as a ligature of the Early Cyrillic I (І) and another letter, used to represent iotation, is iotated.. The use of an iotated letter does not necessarily denote iotation. Even an iotated letter following a consonant letter is not iotated in most orthographies, but iotated letters imply iotated pronunciation after vowels and soft and hard signs as well as in isolation.

In the Cyrillic alphabet, some letter forms are iotated, formed as a ligature of Early Cyrillic I (І) and a vowel.

Normal			Iotated			Comment
Name	Shape	Sound	Name	Shape	Sound	Comment
A	А	/a/	Iotated A	Ꙗ	/ja/	Now supplanted by Ja (Я)
Est'	Є	/e/	Iotated E	Ѥ	/je/	No longer used
Uk	Оу	/u/	Iotated uk	Ю	/ju/	Uk is an archaic form of U (У)
Little Jus	Ѧ	/ẽ/	Iotated little yus	Ѩ	/jẽ/	No longer used
Big Jus	Ѫ	/õ/	Iotated big yus	Ѭ	/jõ/	No longer used as of 1899

In old inscriptions, other iotated letters, even consonants, could be found, but they are not in the regular alphabet.

There are more letters that serve the same function, but their glyph are not made in the same way.

Normal			Iotated			Comment
Name	Shape	Sound	Name	Shape	Sound	Comment
A	Аа	/a/	Ja	Яя	/ja/	Common for East Slavic alphabets
E	Ээ	/e/	Je	Ее	/je/	Used in Belarusian and Russian
E	Ее	/e/	Je	Єє	/je/	Used in Ukrainian
I	Іi	/i/	Ji	Її	/ji/	Used in Ukrainian
O	Оо	/o/	Jo	Ёё	/jo/	The letter is used in Belarusian and Russian, in Ukrainian and Bulgarian the digraphs "Йо" and "Ьо" are used instead
U	Уу	/u/	Ju	Юю	/ju/	Common for East Slavic alphabets

=== Iotated consonants ===
Iotated consonants occur as result of iotation. They are transcribed in IPA with superscript j after, so iotated n is noted as [nʲ].

When Vuk Karadžić reformed the Serbian language, he created new letters to represent iotated consonants. Macedonian uses two of them, but has its own versions for iotated t and d (resembling the letters Г and К instead of Т and Д):

Name	Shape	Sound
Lje	Љ љ	*/lʲ/→/ʎ/
Nje	Њ њ	*/nʲ/→/ɲ/
Tje	Ћ ћ	*/tʲ/→/tɕ/
Dje	Ђ ђ	*/dʲ/→/dʑ/
Kje	Ќ ќ	*/tʲ/→/c/
Gje	Ѓ ѓ	*/dʲ/→/ɟ/

== See also ==
- Cyrillic alphabet
- Cyrillic ligatures
- Iotacism
- Palatalization, the historical-linguistic sound change
- Soft sign
