= Ou (ligature) =

Letter of the Latin alphabet

- Ȣ ȣ
- ᴕ ᴽ

Usage
- Writing system: Latin script
- Type: Alphabetic
- In Unicode: U+0222, U+0223

History
- Variations: ᴕ ᴽ

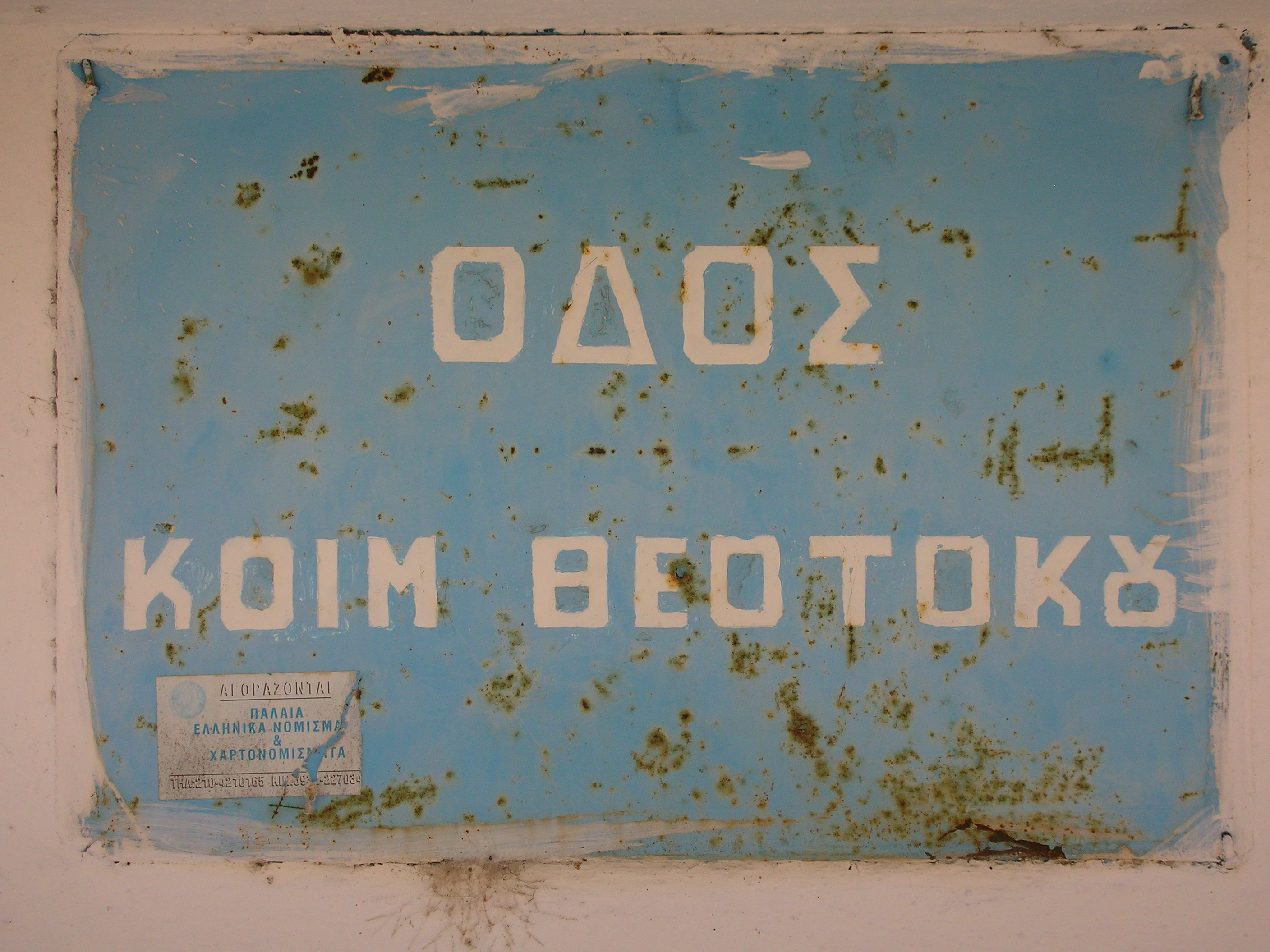
ȣ on a Greek sign

Ou (Majuscule: Ȣ, Minuscule: ȣ) is a ligature of the Greek letters omicron ⟨ο⟩ and upsilon ⟨υ⟩ which was frequently used in Byzantine manuscripts to indicate a close back rounded vowel [u]. The ο–υ ligature is still seen today on icon artwork in Greek Orthodox churches, and sometimes in graffiti or other forms of informal or decorative writing.

In printed works, the ligature is often replaced by Ʊ, an inverted omega.

== Usage ==
The ligature is now mostly used in the context of the Latin alphabet, interpreted as a ligature of Latin o and u: for example, in the orthography of the Wyandot language and of Algonquian languages e.g. in Western Abenaki to represent /ɔ̃/, and in Algonquin to represent /w/, /o/ or /oː/. Today, in Western Abenaki, "ô" is preferred, and in Algonquin, "w" is preferred.

An ou ligature much different in form (with the two letters side-by-side as in most ligatures, as opposed to one on top of the other) was used in the Initial Teaching Alphabet.

The ligature, in both majuscule and minuscule forms, is occasionally used to represent minuscule of "У" in the Romanian transitional alphabet, as the glyph for monograph Uk (ꙋ) is rarely available in font sets.

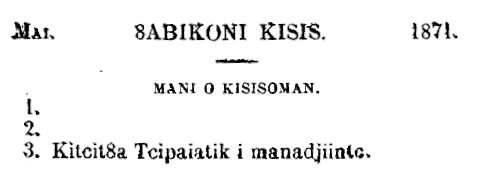
This 1871 Algonquin calendar uses the digit 8 for both capital and lowercase. "ȣabikoni kisis" is today written wàbigonì-gìzis ("May").

The Uralic Phonetic Alphabet uses U+1D15 ᴕ LATIN LETTER SMALL CAPITAL OU and U+1D3D ᴽ MODIFIER LETTER CAPITAL OU to indicate a back vowel of unknown quality.

== Computer encoding ==
In Unicode, it is encoded for use in Latin as "Latin Capital Letter OU" (U+0222 Ȣ) and "Latin Small Letter OU" (U+0223, ȣ) in the Latin Extended-B range, and for use in Cyrillic as Cyrillic letter monograph Uk (uppercase U+A64A, Ꙋ, lowercase U+A64B, ꙋ), in addition to now deprecated "Cyrillic letter Uk" (uppercase U+0478, Ѹ, lowercase U+0479, ѹ), which may be realized with the "о" and "у" either side by side or combined vertically.

Despite the ligature's origin in Greek, there is no separate provision for its encoding in the Greek script, because it was deemed to be a mere ligature on the font level but not a separate underlying character. A proposal for encoding it as "Greek letter ou" was made in 1998, but was rejected.
