= Izhitsa =

Cyrillic letter

- Ѵ ѵ

Usage
- Writing system: Cyrillic
- Type: Alphabetic
- Sound values: [v] or [i]

History
Development
T3
        - Υ υ
          - Ѵ ѵ
- Sisters: V v

Other
- Associated numbers: 400 (Cyrillic numerals)

Izhitsa (Ѵ, ѵ Ѷ ѷ; italics: Ѵ ѵ; Church Slavonic: ѷжица, Russian: ижица, Ukrainian: іжиця) is a letter of the early Cyrillic alphabet and several later alphabets, usually the last in the row. It originates from the Phoenician letter waw and Greek letter upsilon (Y, υ) and was used in words and names derived from or via the Greek language, such as кѵрилъ (kürilǔ, "Cyril", from Greek Κύριλλος) or флаѵии (flavii, "Flavius", from Greek Φλάυιος). It represented the sounds /i/ or /v/ as normal letters и and в, respectively. The Glagolitic alphabet has a corresponding letter with the name izhitsa as well (Ⱛ, ⱛ). Also, izhitsa in its standard form or, most often, in a tailed variant (similar to Latin "y") was part of a digraph оѵ/оу representing the sound /u/. The digraph is known as Cyrillic "uk", and today's Cyrillic У originates from its simplified form.

The letter's traditional name, izhitsa (ижица), is explained as a diminutive either of the word иго (igo, "yoke"), due to the letter's shape, or of иже (izhe, "which"), the name of the main Cyrillic and Glagolitic letters for the same sound, /i/.

The numeral value of Cyrillic izhitsa is 400. Glagolitic izhitsa has no numeral value. Church Slavonic editions printed in Russia use a tailed variant of the letter for the numeral purpose, whereas editions from Serbia or Romania (including books in the Romanian Cyrillic alphabet), as well as early printed books from Ukraine, prefer a basic form of the letter without the tail.

== Russian ==
In the Russian language, the use of izhitsa became progressively rarer during the 18th and 19th centuries. At the beginning of the 20th century, the only two words still spelled with the letter izhitsa in common use were мѵро (müro, [ˈmʲirə], 'chrism') and сѵнодъ (sünod, [sʲɪˈnot], 'synod').

In the documents of the spelling reform of 1917–1918, izhitsa is not mentioned at all, although the statement that it was canceled at that time, along with decimal i, yat and fita, is not only widespread, but also reflected in the Great Soviet Encyclopedia. In fact, Ѵ fell out of use in the civil alphabet gradually, under the influence not only of the general direction of changes in the spelling of the Russian language, but also of the displacement of words and texts on religious topics from the civil press. At the same time, steam locomotives of class Izhitsa (Ѵ) were produced until 1931 and were in operation until they were decommissioned in the 1950s.

== Serbian ==
The traditional spelling of Serbian was more conservative; it preserved all etymologically motivated izhitsas in words of Greek origin. Vuk Stefanović Karadžić had reformed the Serbian alphabet in the beginning of the nineteenth century and eliminated the letter, but the old spelling was used in some places as late as the 1880s.

== Church Slavonic ==
Izhitsa is still in use in the Church Slavonic language. Like Greek upsilon, it can be pronounced as /i/ (like и), or as /v/ (like в). The basic distinction rule is simple: izhitsa with stress and/or aspiration marks is a vowel and therefore pronounced /i/; izhitsa without diacritical marks is a consonant and pronounced /v/. Unstressed, /i/-sounding izhitsas are marked with a special diacritical mark, the so-called kendema or kendima (from the Greek word κέντημα [ˈcendima]). The shape of kendema over izhitsa may vary: in books of Russian origin, it typically looks like a double grave accent or sometimes like a double acute accent. In older Serbian books, kendema most often looked like two dots (trema) or might even be replaced by a surrogate combination of aspiration and acute. These shape distinctions (with the exception of the aspiration-acute combination) have no orthographical meaning and must be considered as just font style variations, thus the Unicode name "IZHITSA WITH DOUBLE GRAVE" is slightly misleading. Izhitsa with kendema (majuscule: Ѷ, minuscule: ѷ) is not a separate letter of the alphabet, but it may have its own position in computer encodings (e.g., Unicode). Historically, izhitsa with kendema corresponds to the Greek upsilon with trema (or διαλυτικά: Ϋ, ϋ). While in modern editions of ancient and modern Greek the trema is used only to prevent a digraph (as ⟨ευ⟩ [ev, ef] versus ⟨εϋ⟩ [ei]), Slavonic usage of kendema still continues that of many medieval Greek manuscripts, in which the "diaeresis" sign was often used simply to mark an upsilon or iota as such, irrespective of any other vowels (e.g. δϊαλϋτϊκά, which would not be correct by today's conventions).

== Romanian ==
Traditional orthography of the Romanian language used izhitsa in the same manner as Church Slavonic, with all the above-mentioned peculiarities. This writing system was used until about 1860 in Romania and until 1920s in church books in Russian-ruled Bessarabia.

== Aleut ==
The Cyrillic letter izhitsa was also used historically in certain loanwords in the Cyrillic script version of Aleut.

== Abkhaz ==
Izhitsa was used in the 1909-1926 Abkhaz alphabet of Chochua.

== Izhitsa as a replacement of a different character ==
In Russian typography, the capital form of izhitsa has traditionally been used instead of the Roman numeral V; this tradition survived several decades longer than izhitsa as a letter of the alphabet.

The izhitsa is sometimes used in place of the new IPA symbol for the labiodental flap (ⱱ) because the signs are similar.

== Computing codes ==
Character information
Preview	Ѵ		ѵ		Ѷ		ѷ	
Unicode name	CYRILLIC CAPITAL LETTER IZHITSA		CYRILLIC SMALL LETTER IZHITSA		CYRILLIC CAPITAL LETTER; IZHITSA WITH DOUBLE GRAVE ACCENT		CYRILLIC SMALL LETTER; IZHITSA WITH DOUBLE GRAVE ACCENT	
Encodings	decimal	hex	dec	hex	dec	hex	dec	hex
Unicode	1140	U+0474	1141	U+0475	1142	U+0476	1143	U+0477
UTF-8	209 180	D1 B4	209 181	D1 B5	209 182	D1 B6	209 183	D1 B7
Numeric character reference	&#1140;	&#x474;	&#1141;	&#x475;	&#1142;	&#x476;	&#1143;	&#x477;

The tailed variant of izhitsa has no individual position in Unicode; instead, the characters U+0423 У CYRILLIC CAPITAL LETTER U and U+0443 у CYRILLIC SMALL LETTER U are supposed to represent it.

== See also ==
- Ү ү : Cyrillic letter ue, used in various languages as a close front rounded vowel (/y/)
- Ӱ ӱ : Cyrillic letter u with diaeresis, used in several languages as a close front rounded vowel (/y/)
