= Yu (Cyrillic) =

Cyrillic letter

- Ю ю
- Ꙕ ꙕ

Usage
- Writing system: Cyrillic
- Type: Alphabetic
- Language of origin: Old Church Slavonic
- Sound values: [ju]
- In Unicode: U+042E, U+044E, U+A654, U+A655

History
- Development: Ο ο and Ι ι: Ю ю
- Transliterations: Yu yu, Ju ju, I͡U i͡u
- Variations: Ꙕ ꙕ

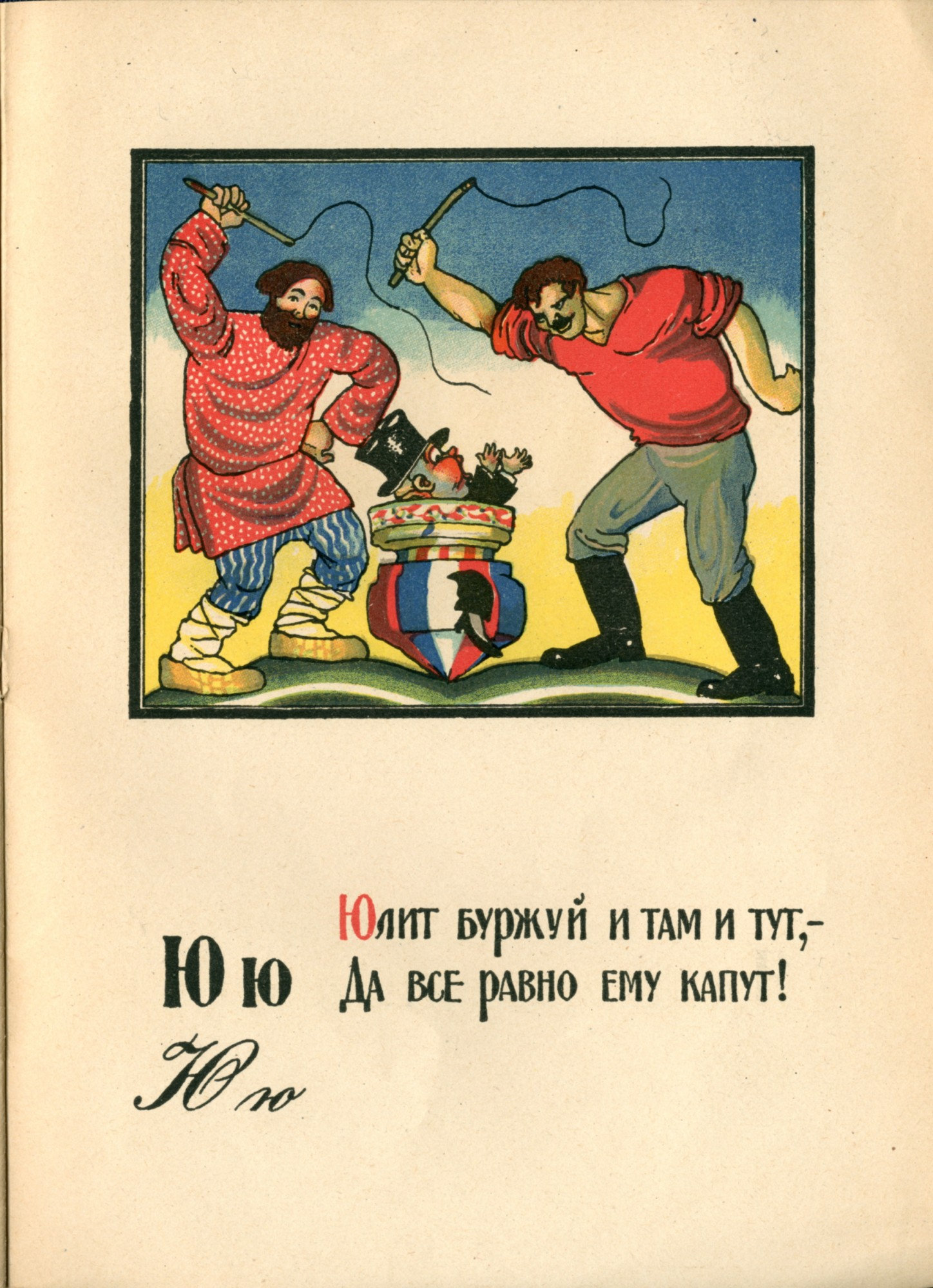
Yu, from the Alphabet Book оf the Red Army Soldier (1921)

Yu or Ju (Ю ю; italics: Ю ю or Ю ю; italics: Ю ю) is a letter of the Cyrillic script used in East Slavic and Bulgarian alphabets.

In English, Yu is commonly romanized as ⟨yu⟩ or ⟨ju⟩. In turn, ⟨ю⟩ is used, where available, in transcriptions of English letter ⟨u⟩ (in open syllables), and also of the ⟨ew⟩ digraph. The sound [y], like ⟨u⟩ in French and ⟨ü⟩ in German, may also be approximated by the letter ⟨ю⟩.

== Pronunciation ==
Sometimes, it is referred to as "Iotated U" because it is a so-called iotated vowel, pronounced in isolation as /ju/, like the pronunciation of ⟨u⟩ in "human". After a consonant, no distinct [j] sound is pronounced, but the consonant is softened. The exact pronunciation of the vowel sound of ⟨ю⟩ in Slavic languages depends also on the succeeding sound. Before a soft consonant, it is [ʉ], the close central rounded vowel, as in 'rude'. Before a hard consonant or at the end of a word, the result is a back vowel [u], as in "pool".

== History ==
Apart from the form I-O, in early Slavonic manuscripts the letter appears also in a mirrored form O-I (Ꙕ, ꙕ). As to its origin: One possibility is that it was derived from the omicron-iota (οι) diphthong. At the time that the Greek alphabet was adapted to the Slavonic language, it denoted the close front rounded vowel /y/ in educated Greek speech. The close front rounded vowel does not appear in East Slavic, thus its approximation would have given way to the letters' modern pronunciation.

There is another possible origin to the modern form. By the analogy to several 'iotated' letters Ѥ, Ꙗ, Ѩ and Ѭ; the iotated version of the archaic Cyrillic digraph (or letter) Uk ⟨І-оѵ⟩/⟨І-оу⟩ could have possibly been derived into the modern letter ⟨ю⟩ through the omission of the latter glyph of the trigraphs, similar to how the modern letter У was derived. This was possible, because early Slavic did not have native <іо> sequences, eliminating potential confusion.

The iotated big Yus ⟨Ѭ⟩ merged itself to ⟨ю⟩ in East Slavic languages.

⟨Ю⟩ is the Voice Quality Symbol for tracheo-œsophageal speech (the symbol attempts to capture iconically the dual nature of the airstream).

== Related letters and other similar characters ==
- У у : Cyrillic letter U
- Ү ү : Cyrillic letter Ue
- Û û : Latin letter U with circumflex
- Ū ū : Latin letter U with macron
- Ǔ ǔ : Latin letter U with caron

== Computing codes ==
Character information
Preview	Ю		ю		Ꙕ		ꙕ	
Unicode name	CYRILLIC CAPITAL LETTER YU		CYRILLIC SMALL LETTER YU		CYRILLIC CAPITAL LETTER REVERSED YU		CYRILLIC SMALL LETTER REVERSED YU	
Encodings	decimal	hex	dec	hex	dec	hex	dec	hex
Unicode	1070	U+042E	1102	U+044E	42580	U+A654	42581	U+A655
UTF-8	208 174	D0 AE	209 142	D1 8E	234 153 148	EA 99 94	234 153 149	EA 99 95
Numeric character reference	&#1070;	&#x42E;	&#1102;	&#x44E;	&#42580;	&#xA654;	&#42581;	&#xA655;
Named character reference	&YUcy;		&yucy;					
KOI8-R and KOI8-U	224	E0	192	C0				
Code page 855	157	9D	156	9C				
Windows-1251	222	DE	254	FE				
ISO-8859-5	206	CE	238	EE				
Macintosh Cyrillic	158	9E	254	FE				
