= Ya (Cyrillic) =

Cyrillic letter

- Я я

Usage
- Writing system: Cyrillic
- Type: Alphabetic
- Language of origin: East Slavic, Bulgarian
- Sound values: [ja], [jɐ], [jɤ], [jæ], [jə], [◌ʲa], [◌ʲɐ], [◌ʲæ] [◌ʲə]
- In Unicode: U+042F, U+044F

History
- Development: Ѧ ѧ: Я я
- Transliterations: Ya ya, Ja ja, Ia ia, I͡A i͡a, Â â, ä

Ya, Ia or Ja (Я я; italics: Я я or Я я; italics: Я я) is a letter of the Cyrillic script, the civil script variant of Old Cyrillic Little Yus (Ѧ ѧ). Among modern Slavic languages, it is used in the East Slavic languages and Bulgarian. It is also used in the Cyrillic alphabets used by Mongolian and many Uralic, Caucasian and Turkic languages of the former Soviet Union.

== Pronunciation ==
The iotated vowel is pronounced /ja/ in initial or post-vocalic positions, like the English pronunciation of ⟨ya⟩ in "yard".

When ⟨я⟩ follows a soft consonant, no /j/ sound occurs between the consonant and the vowel.

The exact pronunciation of the vowel sound of ⟨я⟩ depends also on the following sound by allophony in the Slavic languages. In Russian, before a soft consonant, it is [æ], like in the English "cat". If a hard consonant follows ⟨я⟩ or none, the result is an open vowel, usually [a]. This difference does not exist in the other Cyrillic languages.

In non-stressed positions, the vowel reduction depends on the language and the dialect. The standard Russian language reduces the vowel to [ɪ], but yakanye dialects ⟨я⟩ undergo no reduction unlike other instances of the /a/ phoneme (represented with the letter ⟨а⟩). In Bulgarian, the vowel sound is reduced to /ɐ/ in unstressed syllables and is pronounced /ɤ̞/ in both stressed verb and definite article endings.

== History ==
Little Yus

The letter ѧ, known as little jus (yus) (Bulgarian: малка носовка, Russian: юс малый) originally stood for a front nasal vowel, conventionally transcribed as ę. The history of the letter (in both Church Slavonic and vernacular texts) varies according to the development of this sound in the different areas where Cyrillic was used.

In Serbia, [ɛ̃] became [e] at a very early period and the letter ѧ ceased to be used, being replaced by e. In Bulgaria the situation is complicated by the fact that dialects differ and that there were different orthographic systems in use, but broadly speaking [ɛ̃] became [ɛ] in most positions, but in some circumstances it merged with [ǫ], particularly in inflexional endings, e.g. the third person plural ending of the present tense of certain verbs such as правѧтъ (Modern Bulgarian правят). The letter continued to be used, but its distribution, particularly in regard to the other yuses, was governed as much by orthographical convention as by phonetic value or etymology.

After the Bulgarian language adopted the civil script, the sound /ja/ would come to be represented by the letter я, despite etymological я being pronounced /ɛ/.

Among the Eastern Slavs, [ɛ̃] was denasalised, probably to [æ], which palatalised the preceding consonant; after palatalisation became phonemic, the /æ/ phoneme merged with /a/, and ѧ henceforth indicated /a/ after a palatalised consonant, or else, in initial or post-vocalic position, /ja/. However, Cyrillic already had a character with this function, namely ꙗ, so that for the Eastern Slavs these two characters were henceforth equivalent. The alphabet in Meletij Smotrickij's grammar of 1619 accordingly lists "ꙗ и҆лѝ ѧ" ("ꙗ ili ѧ", "ꙗ or ѧ"); he explains that ꙗ is used initially and ѧ elsewhere. (In fact he also distinguishes the feminine form of the accusative plural of the third person pronoun ѧ҆̀ from the masculine and neuter ꙗ҆̀.) This reflects the practice of earlier scribes and was further codified by the Muscovite printers of the seventeenth century (and is continued in modern Church Slavonic). However, in vernacular and informal writing of the period, the two letters may be used completely indiscriminately.

It was in Russian cursive (skoropis') writing of this time that the letter acquired its modern form: the left-hand leg of ѧ was progressively shortened, eventually disappearing altogether, while the foot of the middle leg shifted towards the left, producing the я shape.

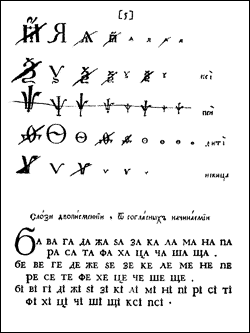
A page with the letter forms for [ja] (first line) with Tsar Peter's choice of Я instead of Ѧ or Ꙗ

In the specimens of the civil script produced for Peter I, forms of ꙗ, ѧ and я were grouped together; Peter removed the first two, leaving only я in the modern alphabet, and its use in Russian remains the same to the present day. It was similarly adopted for the standardised orthographies of modern Ukrainian and Belarusian. In nineteenth-century Bulgaria, both Old Cyrillic and civil scripts were used for printing, with я in the latter corresponding to ѧ in the former, and there were various attempts to standardise the orthography, of which some, such as the Plovdiv school exemplified by Nayden Gerov, were more conservative, essentially preserving the Middle Bulgarian distribution of the letter, others attempted to rationalise spelling on more phonetic principles, and one project in 1893 proposed abolishing the letter я altogether. By the early twentieth century, under Russian influence, я came to be used for /ja/ (which is not a reflex of ę in Bulgarian), retaining its use for /jɐ/ but was no longer used for other purposes; this is its function today.

== Use in loanwords and transcriptions ==
In Russian, the letter has little use in loanwords and orthographic transcriptions of foreign words. A notable exception is the use of ⟨ля⟩ Russian pronunciation: [lʲa] to transcribe /la/, mostly from Romance languages, Polish, German and Arabic. This makes ⟨л⟩ to match [l] better than its dark l pronunciation in ⟨ла⟩. ⟨Я⟩ is also used to transcribe Romanian ⟨ea⟩, pronounced as [e̯a].

Although [æ] is a distinctive pronunciation of ⟨я⟩ in Russian, the letter is almost never used to transcribe that sound, unlike the use of ⟨ю⟩ to approximate close front and central rounded vowels. Nonetheless, ⟨я⟩ is used for Estonian and Finnish ⟨ä⟩ – for instance, Pärnu is written ⟨Пярну⟩ in Russian, although the Russian pronunciation does not match the original.

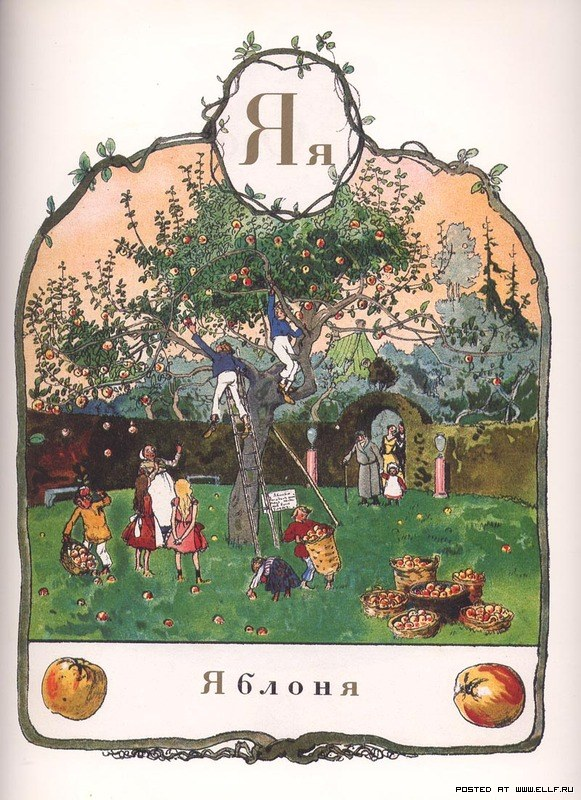
Ya, from Alexandre Benois' 1904 alphabet book, showing Yablonya, "Apple tree"

In internet culture, ⟨Я⟩ is used in faux Cyrillic to substitute the Latin letter ⟨R⟩, as in ⟨Яussia⟩ for "Russia."

== Ya with diaeresis ==
In Russian, ya with diaeresis (Я̈) saw rare use prior to the 1918 orthography reform to indicate that a stressed letter ya (Я) should be pronounced as /jo/ instead of the expected /ja/, in a similar fashion to the effect of yo (Ё) on ye (Е). For example, the modern pronouns её and неё were formerly spelled ея̈ and нея̈ in the genitive and possessive, due to their historical pronunciations as /jɪˈja/ and /nʲɪˈja/, which had since shifted to /jɪˈjo/ and /nʲɪˈjo/. As with the letter yo (Ё), use of the diaeresis was rare outside of learning materials and dictionaries, and following the 1918 reform the letter was replaced with yo outright.

== Ya with breve ==
Ya with breve (Я̆ я̆; italics: Я̆ я̆) is used in the Kazym dialect of the Khanty language.

== Ya with macron ==
Ya with macron (Я̄ я̄; italics: Я̄ я̄) is used in the Aleut (Bering dialect), Evenki, Ingush, Mansi, Nanai, Negidal, Ulch, Kildin Sami, Selkup, Central Siberian Yupik and Chechen languages.

== Related letters and other similar characters ==
- Ѧ ѧ: Cyrillic letter Little Yus
- Ꙗ ꙗ: Cyrillic letter Iotated A
- ᴙ: Latin letter small capital reversed R, used historically in the International Phonetic Alphabet to represent the voiceless uvular trill
- Â â: Latin letter Â - a Romanian and Vietnamese letter
- R r: Latin letter R

== Computing codes ==
Unicode provides separate code-points for the Old Cyrillic and civil script forms of this letter. A number of Old Cyrillic fonts developed before the publication of Unicode 5.1 placed iotated A (Ꙗ/ꙗ) at the code points for Ya (Я/я) instead of the Private Use Area, but since Unicode 5.1, iotated A has been encoded separately from Ya.

Character information
Preview	Я		я	
Unicode name	CYRILLIC CAPITAL LETTER YA		CYRILLIC SMALL LETTER YA	
Encodings	decimal	hex	dec	hex
Unicode	1071	U+042F	1103	U+044F
UTF-8	208 175	D0 AF	209 143	D1 8F
Numeric character reference	&#1071;	&#x42F;	&#1103;	&#x44F;
Named character reference	&YAcy;		&yacy;	
KOI8-R and KOI8-U	241	F1	209	D1
Code page 855	224	E0	222	DE
Code page 866	159	9F	239	EF
Windows-1251	223	DF	255	FF
ISO-8859-5	207	CF	239	EF
Macintosh Cyrillic	159	9F	223	DF

== See also ==
- Faux Cyrillic
- Toys "R" Us, an American toy retailer that uses a homoglyphic "backwards R" in its logo
