= Russian locomotive class Izhitsa =

Russian 0-8-0 steam locomotive class, built 1908–1931

Ѵ (Izhitsa) class steam locomotive
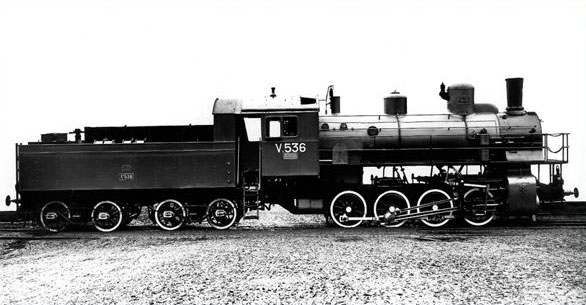
Type and origin
- Power type: Steam
- Build date: 1908—1918, 1927—1931
Specifications
- Configuration
  - Whyte: 0-8-0
  - UIC: D h2
- Gauge: 1,524 mm (5 ft)
- Driver dia.: 1.220–1.300 m (48.03–51.18 in)
- Length: 10.085–10.133 m (33 ft 1 in – 33 ft 3 in)
- Axle load: 16 tonnes (35,300 lb)
- Loco weight: 64.3–65.0 tonnes (141,800–143,300 lb)
- Fuel type: Coal
- Firebox
  - Grate area: 3.03–3.33 m^{2} (32.6–35.8 sq ft)
- Boiler pressure: 12–13 kg/cm^{2} (1.18–1.27 MPa; 171–185 psi)
- Heating surface
  - Tubes and flues: 163.4–206 m^{2} (1,759–2,217 sq ft)
- Superheater
  - Heating area: 40.3–47.4 m^{2} (434–510 sq ft)
- Cylinders: Two, outside
- Cylinder size: 575 mm × 650 mm (22.64 in × 25.59 in)
Performance figures
- Maximum speed: 55 km/h (34 mph)
Career
- Operators: Russian Imperial Railways; → Soviet Railways
- Class: Ѵ

The Russian steam locomotive class Izhitsa (Ѵ) was a steam locomotive produced in Russia and the Soviet Union between 1908 and 1918, and between 1927 and 1931. The Russian letter Ѵ can be transliterated as ü. On Russian and Soviet railways, these were the most powerful steam locomotives of type 0-8-0. They were designed by E. E. Noltein and had a 16-ton axle load.

== Similar class ==
The Russian locomotive class Y (Ы) was similar but had a 15-ton axle load. In the period 1909–1916, 350 class Y (Ы) locomotives were built.

== See also ==
- The Museum of the Moscow Railway, at Paveletsky Rail Terminal, Moscow
- Rizhsky Rail Terminal, Home of the Moscow Railway Museum
- Varshavsky Rail Terminal, St.Petersburg, Home of the Central Museum of Railway Transport, Russian Federation
- Finland Station, St.Petersburg
- History of rail transport in Russia
