= Yus =

Cyrillic letter

- Ѧ ѧ Ѫ ѫ Ꙛ ꙛ Ꙙ ꙙ

Usage
- Writing system: Cyrillic
- Type: Alphabetic
- Sound values: Little: [ɛ̃], Big: [ɔ̃] Iotated little: [jɛ̃] Iotated big: [jɔ̃]

History
- Descendants: • Я (from Ѧ) • 𐍵 (from Ѧ) • Ꙟ (from ѫ)

Other
- Associated numbers: Little: 900 (Cyrillic numerals)

Little yus (Cyrillic: Ѧ, ѧ; Glagolitic: Ⱔ; transliterated: ę) and big yus (Cyr. Ѫ, ѫ; Glag. Ⱘ; transl. ǫ), or jus, are letters of the early Cyrillic and Glagolitic script originally representing two Old Church Slavonic nasal vowels. Each can occur in iotated form (Cyr. Ѩ ѩ, Ѭ ѭ; Glag. Ⱗ, Ⱙ), formed as ligatures with the decimal i (І).

Phonetically, in Old Church Slavonic little yus represented a nasalized front vowel, possibly [ɛ̃] (like the French in in cinq or Polish ę in kęs), while big yus represents a nasalized back vowel, such as IPA [ɔ̃] (like the French on in bombon or Polish ą in kąt).

The names of the letters do not imply capitalization, as both little and big yus exist in majuscule and minuscule variants.

Other yus letters like the closed little yus (Ꙙ ꙙ), iotated closed little yus (Ꙝ ꙝ) and blended yus (Ꙛ ꙛ), were also used historically. Closed little yus is found in Old Church Slavonic and Middle Bulgarian manuscripts, where it may be used contrastively with little yus. In the Codex Suprasliensis, for example, little yus represents [jɛ̃] and the closed version represents [ɛ̃]. Blended yus is found in certain Middle Bulgarian manuscripts where it replaces (and eliminates) both little and big yus.

== Name ==
Modern sources reconstruct the letters' names differently. In many cases, they're referred to as little and big yus, or simply yus: Church Slavonic: юсъ малыи, romanized: jusъ malyi and юсъ большии, jusъ bolьšii. Alternatively, they are reconstructed with the corresponding nasal in place of the ju: ѧсъ, ęsъ and ѫсъ, ǫsъ (iotated variants: ѩсъ, jęsъ; ѭсъ, jǫsъ).

In the oldest Slavic abecedarium, the 11/12th-century Glagolitic Paris Abecedarium (Abecenarium Bulgaricum), the name yus ⟨iuſz⟩ is used for letter Ⱓ (ju, Cyrillic Ю), while Ⱙ (jǫ, Cyr. Ѭ), which is the only letter for a nasal vowel in the abecedarium, is named ⟨hie⟩. It remains unclear if the name yus was originally assigned to Ю or to the nasal vowel(s); if it was the latter, the vowel ǫ would develop into u in Russian, explaining the modern form of the letter name.

== Usage and disappearance ==
Cyrillic little yus (left) and big yus (right); normal forms (above) and iotated (below)

Evolution of cursive little yus into Я

Handwritten little yus

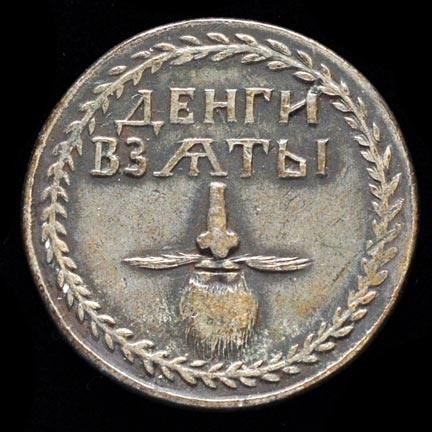
A beard tax token from 1705 containing Ѧ

All modern Slavic languages that use the Cyrillic alphabet have lost the nasal vowels (at least in their standard varieties), making yus unnecessary.

=== In Bulgarian and Macedonian ===
Big yus was a part of the Bulgarian alphabet until 1945. However, by then, in the eastern dialects, the back nasal was pronounced the same way as ъ [ɤ]. Since the new Soviet-sponsored regime wanted to break with the one which it replaced at the end of WWII and closer align the official language with Russian, which was closer to the eastern dialects and had already removed its Big Yus, the western pronunciations were deemed unliterary, and the letter was gone.

There were some Bulgarian and Macedonian dialects spoken around Thessaloniki and Kastoria in northern Greece (Kostur dialect, Solun dialect) that still preserve a nasal pronunciation e.g. [ˈkɤ̃de ˈɡrẽdeʃ ˈmilo ˈt͡ʃẽdo] (Къде гредеш, мило чедо?; "Where are you going, dear child?"), which could be spelled pre-reform as "Кѫдѣ грѧдешъ, мило чѧдо?" with big and little yus.

On a visit to Razlog, in Bulgaria's Pirin Macedonia, in 1955, the Russian dialectologist Samuil Bernstein noticed that the nasal pronunciation of words like [ˈrɤ̃ka] (hand), [ˈt͡ʃẽdo] (child) could still be heard from some of the older women of the village. To the younger people, the pronunciation was completely alien; they would think that the old ladies were speaking Modern Greek.

=== In Russian ===
In Russia, the little yus came to be pronounced as an iotated /ja/ (я) in the middle or at the end of a word and therefore came to represent that sound also elsewhere; the modern letter я is an adaptation of its cursive form of the 17th century, enshrined by the typographical reform of 1708. (That is also why я in Russian often corresponds to nasalized ę in Polish; cf. Russian пять; Polish pięć.)

=== In Polish ===
In Polish, which is a Slavic language written in the Latin alphabet, the letter Ę ę has the phonetic value of the little yus, and Ą ą has that of the big yus. The iotated forms are written ję and ją, respectively, and softened ię and ią also exist, but both historically stem from the un-iotated little yus. The phonemes written as ę and ą are not directly descended from the original Proto-Slavic vowels that the little and big yus represented - instead they developed after the original nasals merged in Polish and then diverged again, often creating alternating pairs (e.g. ząb – zęby, from Proto-Slavic *zǫbъ – *zǫbi). The following table details the exact correspondences of the present Polish nasals to the Proto-Slavic sounds and the respective sound shifts that took place, demonstrated using same stem alternations:

*ę (Ѧ)	*ǫ (Ѫ)
ię: *pamętnъjь → pamiętny ią: *pamętьka → pamiątka ę (after ż, cz, sz, c, rz): *čęstь → część ą (after ż, cz, sz, c, rz): *čęstьka → cząstka	ą: *mǫdrъjь → mądry ę: *mǫdrьcь → mędrzec
*ję (Ѩ)	*jǫ (Ѭ)
ję: *zajętъ → zajęty ją: *zajęlъ → zajął	ją: *jьmajǫtъkъ → majątek јę: *jьmajǫtьnъjь→ majętny

=== In Kashubian ===
Kashubian uses the letter ã in place of ѧ in reflexive pronoun sã (Polish: się), and also in other words like jãzëk ('tongue', język, Church Slavonic: ѩзꙑкъ), piãc ('five', Polish: pięć, Slovak: päť, Church Slavonic: пѧть), cãżczi ('heavy', Polish: ciężki, Church Slavonic: тѧжькъ), semiã ('seed', Polish: siemię, Church Slavonic: сѣмѧ), and miãso ('meat', Polish: mięso, Slovak: mäso, Church Slavonic: мѧсо).

=== In Romanian ===
Little and big yuses can also be found in the Romanian Cyrillic alphabet, used until 1862. Little yus was used for /ja/ and big yus for unknown vowels, transcribed in later Romanian as /ɨ/ and /ə/. Now Romanian uses the Latin alphabet and /ɨ/ is written Îî or Ââ. /ə/ is written as Ăă.

One of the first transcriptions of the big yus as î in Romanian is found in Acatist (1801, Sibiu) by Samuil Micu-Klein.

=== In Slovak ===
Little yus in the Slovak alphabet has been substituted by a (desať, načať), e (plesať), iotated ia (žiadať, kliatba, mesiac), ie (bdieť) and ä in several cases (pamäť, päť, svätý). Big yus is transliterated and pronounced as u, or accented ú (budeš, muž, mučeník, ruka, navyknúť, pristúpiť, púť, usnúť). Iotated, and closed iotated form of little yus occur as ja (e.g. jazyk, svoja, javiť, jasle).

=== In Ruthenian ===
In Ruthenian language, little yus was used to transcribe the sound ja (as in руска(ѧ) мова ("Ruthenian language") or ѧзыкъ ("language")). This evolved into and corresponded with the letter я in the descendant languages of Belarusian, Ukrainian, and Rusyn.

== Related letters and other similar characters ==
- Я я : Cyrillic letter Ya
- Ꙗ ꙗ: Cyrillic letter Iotated A
- Ѣ ѣ : Cyrillic letter Yat
- Ę ę : Latin letter E with ogonek - a Polish and Lithuanian letter
- Ą ą : Latin letter A with ogonek - a Polish and Lithuanian letter
- 𐍵 : Abur letter Yus

== Computing codes ==
Character information
Preview	Ѧ		ѧ		Ѩ		ѩ	
Unicode name	CYRILLIC CAPITAL LETTER; LITTLE YUS		CYRILLIC SMALL LETTER; LITTLE YUS		CYRILLIC CAPITAL LETTER; IOTIFIED LITTLE YUS		CYRILLIC SMALL LETTER; IOTIFIED LITTLE YUS	
Encodings	decimal	hex	dec	hex	dec	hex	dec	hex
Unicode	1126	U+0466	1127	U+0467	1128	U+0468	1129	U+0469
UTF-8	209 166	D1 A6	209 167	D1 A7	209 168	D1 A8	209 169	D1 A9
Numeric character reference	&#1126;	&#x466;	&#1127;	&#x467;	&#1128;	&#x468;	&#1129;	&#x469;

Character information
Preview	Ѫ		ѫ		Ѭ		ѭ	
Unicode name	CYRILLIC CAPITAL LETTER; BIG YUS		CYRILLIC SMALL LETTER; BIG YUS		CYRILLIC CAPITAL LETTER; IOTIFIED BIG YUS		CYRILLIC SMALL LETTER; IOTIFIED BIG YUS	
Encodings	decimal	hex	dec	hex	dec	hex	dec	hex
Unicode	1130	U+046A	1131	U+046B	1132	U+046C	1133	U+046D
UTF-8	209 170	D1 AA	209 171	D1 AB	209 172	D1 AC	209 173	D1 AD
Numeric character reference	&#1130;	&#x46A;	&#1131;	&#x46B;	&#1132;	&#x46C;	&#1133;	&#x46D;

Character information
Preview	Ꙛ		ꙛ	
Unicode name	CYRILLIC CAPITAL LETTER; BLENDED YUS		CYRILLIC SMALL LETTER; BLENDED YUS	
Encodings	decimal	hex	dec	hex
Unicode	42586	U+A65A	42587	U+A65B
UTF-8	234 153 154	EA 99 9A	234 153 155	EA 99 9B
Numeric character reference	&#42586;	&#xA65A;	&#42587;	&#xA65B;

Character information
Preview	Ꙙ		ꙙ		Ꙝ		ꙝ	
Unicode name	CYRILLIC CAPITAL LETTER; CLOSED LITTLE YUS		CYRILLIC SMALL LETTER; CLOSED LITTLE YUS		CYRILLIC CAPITAL LETTER; IOTIFIED CLOSED LITTLE YUS		CYRILLIC SMALL LETTER; IOTIFIED CLOSED LITTLE YUS	
Encodings	decimal	hex	dec	hex	dec	hex	dec	hex
Unicode	42584	U+A658	42585	U+A659	42588	U+A65C	42589	U+A65D
UTF-8	234 153 152	EA 99 98	234 153 153	EA 99 99	234 153 156	EA 99 9C	234 153 157	EA 99 9D
Numeric character reference	&#42584;	&#xA658;	&#42585;	&#xA659;	&#42588;	&#xA65C;	&#42589;	&#xA65D;

Character information
Preview	ⷽ		ⷾ		ⷿ	
Unicode name	COMBINING CYRILLIC LETTER; LITTLE YUS		COMBINING CYRILLIC LETTER; BIG YUS		COMBINING CYRILLIC LETTER; IOTIFIED BIG YUS	
Encodings	decimal	hex	dec	hex	dec	hex
Unicode	11773	U+2DFD	11774	U+2DFE	11775	U+2DFF
UTF-8	226 183 189	E2 B7 BD	226 183 190	E2 B7 BE	226 183 191	E2 B7 BF
Numeric character reference	&#11773;	&#x2DFD;	&#11774;	&#x2DFE;	&#11775;	&#x2DFF;
