= Yn =

Archaic Cyrillic letter

- Ꙟ ꙟ

Usage
- Writing system: Cyrillic
- Type: Alphabetic
- Language of origin: Romanian Cyrillic
- Sound values: [ɨn], [ɨm], [ɨ]
- In Unicode: U+A65E, U+A65F

Yn (Ꙟ ꙟ; italics: Ꙟ ꙟ or Ꙟ ꙟ; italics: Ꙟ ꙟ) is an archaic Cyrillic letter. It was an innovation entirely unique to the Romanian Cyrillic alphabet, not appearing in any other Cyrillic alphabet. It was derived from the Cyrillic glyph big yus.

It was used in the Romanian Cyrillic alphabet, where it represented the sounds [ɨn], [ɨm], and [ɨ] at the beginning of words. In the 19th century, it was replaced in the Romanian alphabet by ⟨în⟩, ⟨îm⟩, or ⟨î⟩.

It was used interchangeably with big yus up until the years 1683–1688, when it began to only be used in word initial position.

== Computing codes ==
Character information
Preview	Ꙟ		ꙟ	
Unicode name	CYRILLIC CAPITAL LETTER YN		CYRILLIC SMALL LETTER YN	
Encodings	decimal	hex	dec	hex
Unicode	42590	U+A65E	42591	U+A65F
UTF-8	234 153 158	EA 99 9E	234 153 159	EA 99 9F
Numeric character reference	&#42590;	&#xA65E;	&#42591;	&#xA65F;

The Upwards Arrow (↑) is sometimes substituted on an ad hoc basis when font support is not available.

== See also ==
- Cyrillic script in Unicode
