= Fita =

Cyrillic letter

Fita / ѳита́
- Ѳ ѳ

Usage
- Writing system: Cyrillic
- Type: Alphabetic
- Language of origin: Old Church Slavonic
- Sound values: [f], [t], [θ]
- In Unicode: U+0472, U+0473
- Alphabetical position: 43rd

History
- Development: 𐤈: Θ θ; Ѳ ѳ
- Time period: c. 893–present

Other
- Associated numbers: 9 (Cyrillic numerals)

Fita (Ѳ ѳ; italics: Ѳ ѳ) is a letter of the Early Cyrillic alphabet. The shape and the name of the letter are derived from the Greek letter theta (Θ θ). In the ISO 9 system, Ѳ is romanized using F grave accent (F̀ f̀).

In the Cyrillic numeral system, Fita has a numerical value of 9.

== Shape ==
In traditional (Church Slavonic) typefaces, the central line is typically about twice the width of the letter's body and has serifs similar to those on the letter Т:. Sometimes the line is drawn as low as the baseline, which makes the letter difficult to distinguish from Д.

== Usage ==
=== Old Russian and Church Slavonic ===
The traditional Russian name of the letter is фита́ fitá (or, in pre-1918 spelling, ѳита́). Fita was mainly used to write proper names and loanwords derived from or via Greek. Russians pronounced these names with the sound /f/ instead of /θ/ (like the pronunciation of ⟨th⟩ in "thin"), for example "Theodore" was pronounced as "Feodor" (now "Fyodor").

Early texts in Russian (and in the Russian recension of Church Slavonic) demonstrate an increasing interchangeability of Ѳ and Ф. Some scribes preferred one of the two letters and ignored the other. There existed an orthographical system to write Ѳ in an initial position and Ф elsewhere. Since the middle of the 17th century, selection between Ѳ and Ф was re-adjusted to exactly follow the Greek origin, the system still in use in Church Slavonic orthography.

=== Russian ===
In the first variant of the Petrine Russian alphabet (1707–1708), the letter fita was eliminated and fe (Ф) became the only way to represent /f/. But in the 19th century, the letter fita was restored and both letters co-existed until the 1918 spelling reform, when fita was replaced by fe again.

Many Greek words with theta were adopted in Russian with te (Т т) instead of fita (mostly through Latin or other Western European languages), such as теорема 'theorem', атлетъ 'athlete', пантера 'panther', and фталевый 'phthalic'. Sometimes dual spellings/pronunciations existed: ѳеатръ/театръ 'theatre', аѳеизмъ/атеизмъ 'atheism', алгориѳмъ/алгоритмъ 'algorithm', and каѳолическій/католическій 'Catholic'; the variants with fita (in modern spelling with Ф) are typically more archaic or special.

=== Other languages ===
In other languages which use the Cyrillic alphabet, fita was pronounced /t/ and was replaced with te (Т т). For example, the Bulgarian, Macedonian and Serbian version of Theodore is Тодор Todor or Теодор Teodor.

=== Romanian ===
Called thita, ⟨Ѳ⟩ is part of the Romanian Cyrillic alphabet, which was used until about 1860.

=== Aleut ===
Fita was used in the first Cyrillic version of the Aleut alphabet, typically in loanwords.

== Related letters and other similar characters ==
- Θ θ/ϑ : Greek letter theta
- Ө ө : Cyrillic letter oe, currently used in the Kazakh, Kyrgyz, Tuvan, and Mongolian languages

== Computing codes ==
Character information
Preview	Ѳ		ѳ	
Unicode name	CYRILLIC CAPITAL LETTER FITA		CYRILLIC SMALL LETTER FITA	
Encodings	decimal	hex	dec	hex
Unicode	1138	U+0472	1139	U+0473
UTF-8	209 178	D1 B2	209 179	D1 B3
Numeric character reference	&#1138;	&#x472;	&#1139;	&#x473;

== See also ==
- Th-fronting, pronunciation of English "th" as "f" or "v".
- Ҫ ҫ : Cyrillic letter the, which is pronounced in Bashkir as a voiceless dental fricative (/θ/)
- Т̌ т̌ : Cyrillic letter te with caron, pronounced in Wakhi Cyrillic as a voiceless dental fricative (/θ/)
