= Romanian transitional alphabet =

19th-Century Latin-Cyrillic mixed alphabet used in Romania as a transitional script

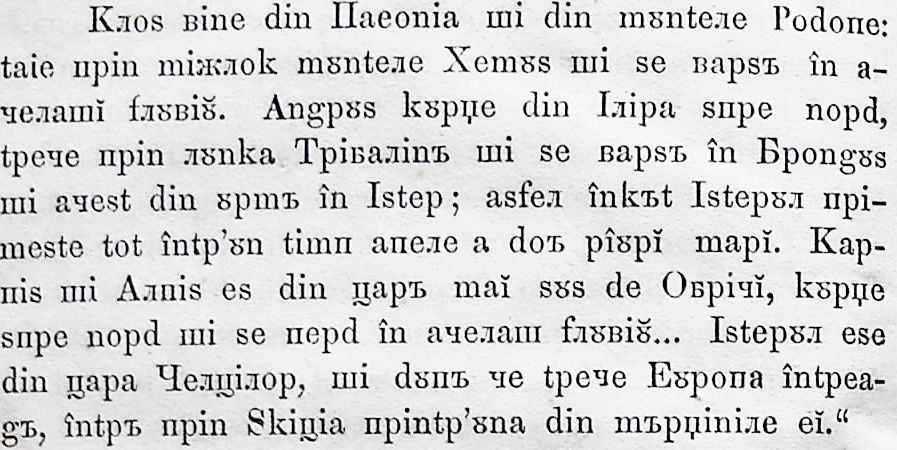
- Fragment of Dimitrie Bolintineanu's Călătorii pe Dunăre și în Bulgaria, 1858
- Script type: Alphabet
- Period: 19th century
- Languages: Romanian

Related scripts
- Parent systems: Phoenician alphabet: Greek alphabet; Glagolitic alphabet/Old Italic scripts; Cyrillic/Latin alphabet; Romanian transitional alphabet

The Romanian transitional alphabet (Romanian: Alfabetul român de tranziție), also known as the civil alphabet (Romanian: alfabetul civil), was a series of alphabets containing a mix of Cyrillic and Latin characters used for the Romanian language in the 19th century. It replaced the Romanian Cyrillic alphabet and was in turn replaced by the Romanian Latin alphabet.

The transition process began in 1828 thanks to the grammars of Ion Heliade Rădulescu, although the Romanian Orthodox Church continued to use the Romanian Cyrillic for religious purposes until 1881, after the declaration of independence of Romania. The Holy Synod of the Romanian Orthodox Church decided to replace the Cyrillic alphabet in that year under secular pressure.

Foaie pentru minte, inimă și literatură, the literary supplement of the Romanian newspaper Gazeta de Transilvania using the transitional alphabet in 1840

The Romanian transitional alphabet began to gain more popularity after 1840, when Latin letters were first introduced between Cyrillic ones and then replacing some of the Cyrillic letters with Latin letters so that the readers of Romanian from Moldavia, Transylvania and Wallachia could become accustomed to them. The final turning point was completed under French influence, which arose due to the Wallachian and Moldavian revolutions of 1848 and the Crimean War which ended with the Treaty of Paris of 1856.

The complete replacement of the Cyrillic alphabet by the Latin alphabet in the United Principalities of Moldavia and Wallachia was formalized in 1862 by Prince Alexandru Ioan Cuza. The Romanian transitional alphabet became one of the symbols of Romanian unity and the national-bourgeois revolution, a direct consequence of the Revolutions of 1848 that also affected Wallachia and Moldavia. A lot of texts written in the transitional alphabet exist in libraries across Romania and Republic of Moldova. Some are digitized but inaccessible to modern readers unfamiliar with the Cyrillic letters with efforts to transliterate it to the modern Latin alphabet underway.

The progression of the Romanian transitional alphabet from 1833 to 1860

== See also ==
- Romanian Cyrillic alphabet
- Romanian alphabet
- Re-latinization of Romanian
- Old Church Slavonic in Romania
