= U (Cyrillic) =

Cyrillic letter

- У у

Usage
- Writing system: Cyrillic
- Type: Alphabetic
- Language of origin: Old Church Slavonic
- Sound values: [u], [ʊw]
- In Unicode: U+0423, U+0443

History
Development
T3
        - Υ υ and Ο ο
          - Ѹ ѹ
            - У у
- Transliterations: U u

Other
- Associated numbers: 400 (Cyrillic numerals)

U (У у; italics: У у or У у; italics: У у) is a letter of the Cyrillic script. It commonly represents the close back rounded vowel /u/, somewhat like the pronunciation of ⟨oo⟩ in "boot" or "boo". The forms of the Cyrillic letter U are similar to the lowercase of the Latin letter Y (Y y; Y y).

== History ==
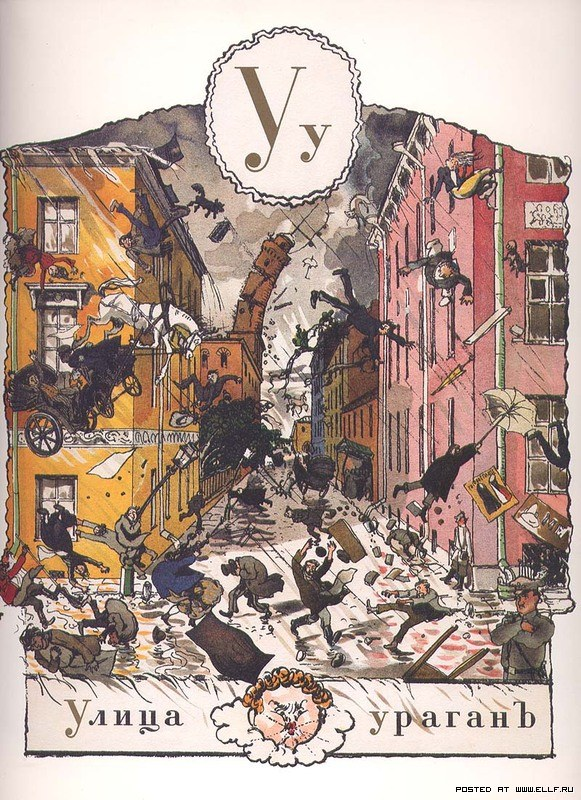
U, from Alexandre Benois' 1904 alphabet book. It shows Ulitsa (street) and uraganʺ (hurricane).

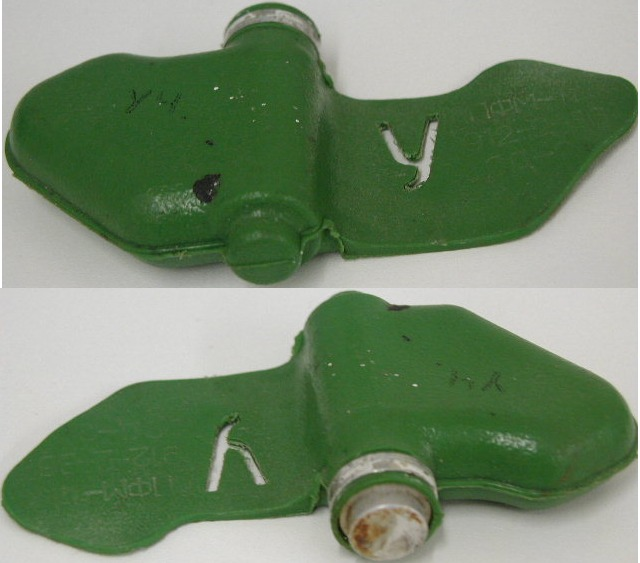
A PFM-1 training mine, distinguishable from the live version by the presence of the letter У (short for учебный, uchebnyy, "for training").

Historically, Cyrillic U evolved as a specifically East Slavic short form of the digraph ⟨оу⟩ used in ancient Slavic texts to represent /u/. The digraph was itself a direct loan from the Greek alphabet, where the combination ⟨ου⟩ (omicron-upsilon) was also used to represent /u/. Later, the o was removed, leaving the modern upsilon-only form.

Consequently, the form of the letter is derived from Greek upsilon ⟨Υ υ⟩, which was parallelly also taken over into the Cyrillic alphabet in another form, as Izhitsa ⟨Ѵ⟩. (The letter Izhitsa was removed from the Russian alphabet in the orthography reform of 1917/19.)

It is normally romanised as "u", but in Kazakh, it is romanised as "w".

In the Cyrillic numeral system, the Cyrillic letter U had a value of 400.

== In other languages ==
In Tuvan the Cyrillic letter can be written as a double vowel.

In certain languages, U is used to mark labialization.

== Related letters and other similar characters ==
Similarity with Y (uppercase): The grapheme on the left is clearly a Cyrillic U, the one in the middle may represent both letters, the one on the right is clearly a Greek or Latin Y.

- Υ υ : Greek letter Upsilon
- U u : Latin letter U
- Ú ú : Latin letter Ú
- Y y : Latin letter Y
- Ў ў : Cyrillic letter Short U, used in Belarusian, Dungan, Siberian Eskimo (Yuit), Uzbek
- Ӯ ӯ : Cyrillic letter U with macron, used in Tajik and Carpatho-Rusyn
- Ӱ ӱ : Cyrillic letter U with diaeresis, used in Altai (Oyrot), Khakas, Gagauz, Khanty, Mari
- Ӳ ӳ : Cyrillic letter U with double acute, used in Chuvash
- Ү ү : Cyrillic letter straight U, used in Mongolian, Kazakh, Tatar, Bashkir, Dungan and other languages
- Ұ ұ : Cyrillic letter Straight U with stroke, used in Kazakh
- Ꭹ Ꮍ : The syllables gi and mu of the Cherokee syllabary; Ꭹ (gi) notably appearing in the Cherokee self-designation ᏣᎳᎩ (Tsalagi)
- ע: The Hebrew letter Ayin
- У̊: Cyrillic letter U with ring, used in Shugnhi orthography.

== Computing codes ==
Character information
Preview	У		у	
Unicode name	CYRILLIC CAPITAL LETTER U		CYRILLIC SMALL LETTER U	
Encodings	decimal	hex	dec	hex
Unicode	1059	U+0423	1091	U+0443
UTF-8	208 163	D0 A3	209 131	D1 83
Numeric character reference	&#1059;	&#x423;	&#1091;	&#x443;
Named character reference	&Ucy;		&ucy;	
KOI8-R and KOI8-U	245	F5	213	D5
Code page 855	232	E8	231	E7
Code page 866	147	93	227	E3
Windows-1251	211	D3	243	F3
ISO-8859-5	195	C3	227	E3
Macintosh Cyrillic	147	93	243	F3
