= Upsilon =

Twentieth letter in the Greek alphabet

Upsilon (US: /ˈʌpsɪlɒn, ˈ(j)uːp-, -lən/, UK: /(j)uːpˈsaɪlən, ˈʊpsɪlɒn/; uppercase Υ, lowercase υ; Greek: ύψιλον ýpsilon [ˈipsilon]) or ypsilon /ɪp-/ is the twentieth letter of the Greek alphabet. In the system of Greek numerals, Υʹ has a value of 400. It is derived from the Phoenician waw (𐤅).

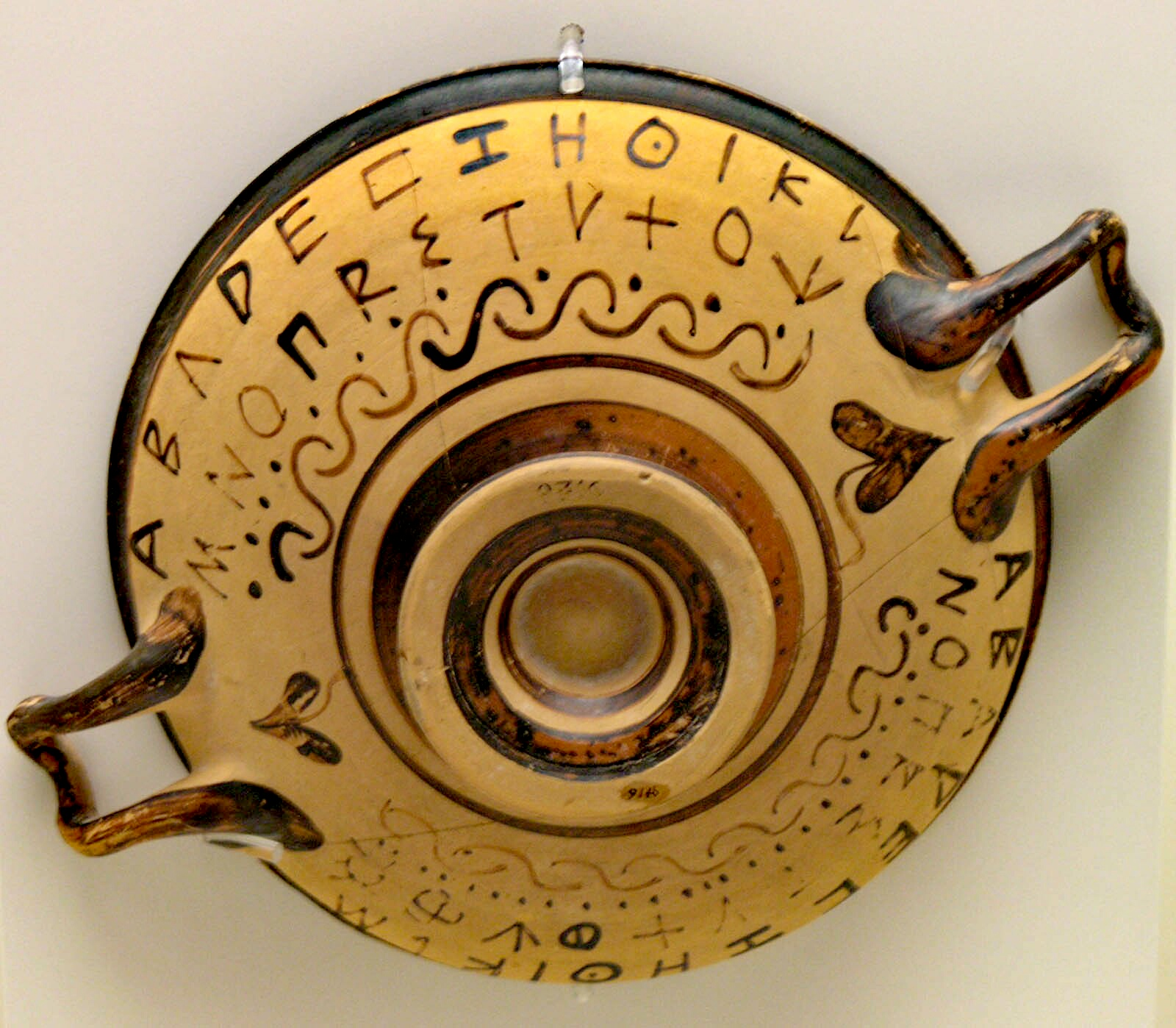
The Greek alphabet on a black figure vessel, with a V-shaped upsilon

== Etymology ==
The name of the letter was originally just υ (y, also called ὑ hy, hence hyoid, meaning 'shaped like the letter υ'), but the name changed to υ ψιλόν (=υ psilon, 'u-plain' or 'u-simple') to distinguish it from οι, which had come to have the same [y] pronunciation.

== Pronunciation ==
In early Attic Greek (6th century BC), it was pronounced [u] (a close back rounded vowel like the English "long o͞o"). In Classical Greek, it was pronounced [y] (a close front rounded vowel), at least until 1030. In Modern Greek, it is pronounced [i]; in the digraphs ⟨αυ⟩ and ⟨ευ⟩, as /f/ or /v/; and in the digraph ⟨ου⟩ as /u/. In ancient Greek, it occurred in both long and short versions, but Modern Greek does not have a length distinction.

As an initial letter in Classical Greek, it always carried the rough breathing (equivalent to h) as reflected in the many Greek-derived English words, such as those that begin with hyper- and hypo-. This rough breathing was derived from an older pronunciation that used a sibilant instead; this sibilant was not lost in Latin, giving rise to such cognates as super- (for hyper-) and sub- (for hypo-).

Upsilon participated as the second element in falling diphthongs, which have subsequently developed in various ways.

== Correspondence with Latin Y ==
Cyrillic У, Latin Y and Greek Υ (upsilon) and ϒ (hooked upsilon) in FreeSerif – one of the few typefaces that distinguish between the Latin and the Greek form

The use of Y in Latin dates back to the first century BC. It was used to transcribe loanwords from Greek, so it was not a native sound of Latin and was usually pronounced /u/ or /i/. The latter pronunciation was the most common in the Classical period and was used mostly by uneducated people. The Roman Emperor Claudius proposed introducing a new letter into the Latin alphabet to transcribe the so-called sonus medius (a short vowel before labial consonants), but in inscriptions, the new letter was sometimes used for Greek upsilon instead.

Four letters of the Latin alphabet arose from it: V, Y and, much later, U and W. In the Cyrillic script, the letters U (У, у) and izhitsa (Ѵ, ѵ) arose from it.

In some languages, including German and Portuguese, the name upsilon (Ypsilon in German, ípsilon in Portuguese) is used to refer to the Latin letter Y as well as the Greek letter. In some other languages, the (Latin) Y is referred to as a "Greek I" (i griega in Spanish, i grec in French and Romanian), also noting its Greek origin.

== Usage ==
- In particle physics the capital Greek letter ϒ denotes an Upsilon particle. Note that the symbol should always look like $\,\Upsilon$ in order to avoid confusion with a Latin Y denoting the hypercharge. This may be done either with a font such as FreeSerif or with the dedicated Unicode character U+03D2 ϒ.
- Automobile manufacturer Lancia has a model called the Ypsilon.
- In the International Phonetic Alphabet, the symbol ⟨ʋ⟩ is used to represent a labiodental approximant.
- In astrophysics and physical cosmology, ϒ refers to the mass-to-light ratio.
- In statistics, it is sometimes used instead of v or nu to indicate degrees of freedom.

=== Similar appearance ===
- A similar symbol U+2648 ♈ ARIES is used for the astrological sign of Aries.

== Symbolism ==
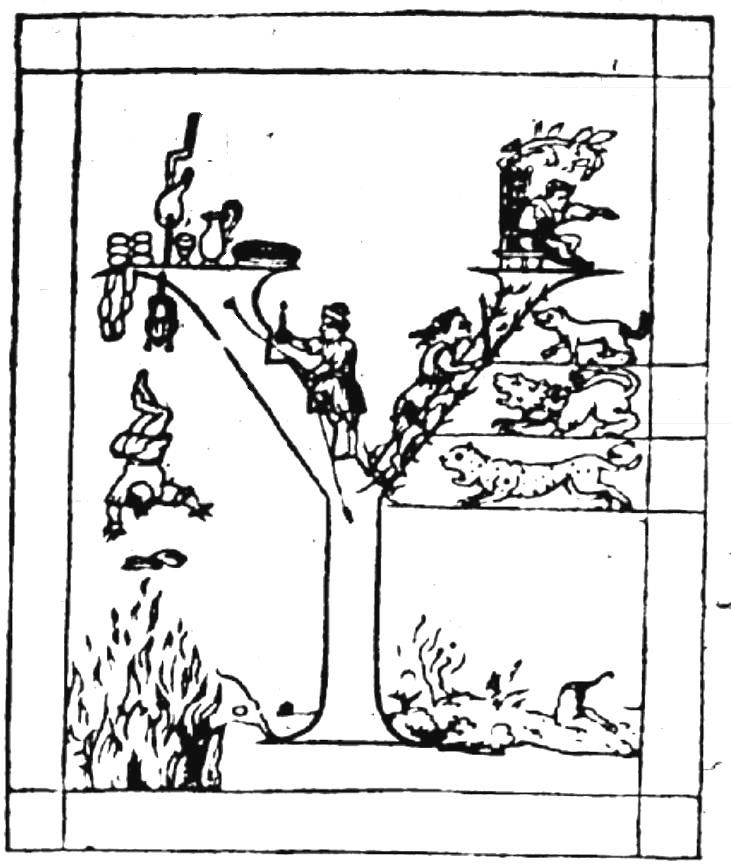
Geoffroy Tory Ypsilon

Upsilon is known as Pythagoras' letter, or the Samian letter, because Pythagoras used it as an emblem of the path of virtue or vice. As the Roman writer Persius wrote in Satire III:

and the letter which spreads out into Pythagorean branches has pointed out to you the steep path which rises on the right.

Lactantius, an early Christian author (c. 240 – c. 320), refers to this:

For they say that the course of human life resembles the letter Y, because every one of men, when he has reached the threshold of early youth, and has arrived at the place "where the way divides itself into two parts," is in doubt, and hesitates, and does not know to which side he should rather turn himself.

== Character encodings ==
Upsilon and Coptic Ua characters.

- U+01B1 Ʊ LATIN CAPITAL LETTER UPSILON
- U+028A ʊ LATIN SMALL LETTER UPSILON
- U+038E Ύ GREEK CAPITAL LETTER UPSILON WITH TONOS
- U+03A5 Υ GREEK CAPITAL LETTER UPSILON (&Upsilon;)
- U+03AB Ϋ GREEK CAPITAL LETTER UPSILON WITH DIALYTIKA
- U+03B0 ΰ GREEK SMALL LETTER UPSILON WITH DIALYTIKA AND TONOS
- U+03C5 υ GREEK SMALL LETTER UPSILON (&upsi;, &upsilon;)
- U+03CB ϋ GREEK SMALL LETTER UPSILON WITH DIALYTIKA
- U+03CD ύ GREEK SMALL LETTER UPSILON WITH TONOS
- U+03D2 ϒ GREEK UPSILON WITH HOOK SYMBOL (&Upsi;, &upsih;)
- U+03D3 ϓ GREEK UPSILON WITH ACUTE AND HOOK SYMBOL
- U+03D4 ϔ GREEK UPSILON WITH DIAERESIS AND HOOK SYMBOL
- U+1D7F ᵿ LATIN SMALL LETTER UPSILON WITH STROKE
- U+1DB7 ᶷ MODIFIER LETTER SMALL UPSILON
- U+1F50 ὐ GREEK SMALL LETTER UPSILON WITH PSILI
- U+1F51 ὑ GREEK SMALL LETTER UPSILON WITH DASIA
- U+1F52 ὒ GREEK SMALL LETTER UPSILON WITH PSILI AND VARIA
- U+1F53 ὓ GREEK SMALL LETTER UPSILON WITH DASIA AND VARIA
- U+1F54 ὔ GREEK SMALL LETTER UPSILON WITH PSILI AND OXIA
- U+1F55 ὕ GREEK SMALL LETTER UPSILON WITH DASIA AND OXIA
- U+1F56 ὖ GREEK SMALL LETTER UPSILON WITH PSILI AND PERISPOMENI
- U+1F57 ὗ GREEK SMALL LETTER UPSILON WITH DASIA AND PERISPOMENI
- U+1F59 Ὑ GREEK CAPITAL LETTER UPSILON WITH DASIA
- U+1F5B Ὓ GREEK CAPITAL LETTER UPSILON WITH DASIA AND VARIA
- U+1F5D Ὕ GREEK CAPITAL LETTER UPSILON WITH DASIA AND OXIA
- U+1F5F Ὗ GREEK CAPITAL LETTER UPSILON WITH DASIA AND PERISPOMENI
- U+1F7A ὺ GREEK SMALL LETTER UPSILON WITH VARIA
- U+1F7B ύ GREEK SMALL LETTER UPSILON WITH OXIA
- U+1FE0 ῠ GREEK SMALL LETTER UPSILON WITH VRACHY
- U+1FE1 ῡ GREEK SMALL LETTER UPSILON WITH MACRON
- U+1FE2 ῢ GREEK SMALL LETTER UPSILON WITH DIALYTIKA AND VARIA
- U+1FE3 ΰ GREEK SMALL LETTER UPSILON WITH DIALYTIKA AND OXIA
- U+1FE6 ῦ GREEK SMALL LETTER UPSILON WITH PERISPOMENI
- U+1FE7 ῧ GREEK SMALL LETTER UPSILON WITH DIALYTIKA AND PERISPOMENI
- U+1FE8 Ῠ GREEK CAPITAL LETTER UPSILON WITH VRACHY
- U+1FE9 Ῡ GREEK CAPITAL LETTER UPSILON WITH MACRON
- U+1FEA Ὺ GREEK CAPITAL LETTER UPSILON WITH VARIA
- U+1FEB Ύ GREEK CAPITAL LETTER UPSILON WITH OXIA
- U+2CA8 Ⲩ COPTIC CAPITAL LETTER UA
- U+2CA9 ⲩ COPTIC SMALL LETTER UA
- U+1D6BC 𝚼 MATHEMATICAL BOLD CAPITAL UPSILON
- U+1D6D6 𝛖 MATHEMATICAL BOLD SMALL UPSILON
- U+1D6F6 𝛶 MATHEMATICAL ITALIC CAPITAL UPSILON
- U+1D710 𝜐 MATHEMATICAL ITALIC SMALL UPSILON
- U+1D730 𝜰 MATHEMATICAL BOLD ITALIC CAPITAL UPSILON
- U+1D74A 𝝊 MATHEMATICAL BOLD ITALIC SMALL UPSILON
- U+1D76A 𝝪 MATHEMATICAL SANS-SERIF BOLD CAPITAL UPSILON
- U+1D784 𝞄 MATHEMATICAL SANS-SERIF BOLD SMALL UPSILON
- U+1D7A4 𝞤 MATHEMATICAL SANS-SERIF BOLD ITALIC CAPITAL UPSILON
- U+1D7BE 𝞾 MATHEMATICAL SANS-SERIF BOLD ITALIC SMALL UPSILON
