= Uk (Cyrillic) =

Cyrillic letter

- Ѹ ѹ Ꙋ ꙋ

Usage
- Writing system: Cyrillic
- Type: Alphabetic
- Sound values: /u/

History
- Development: Υ υ and Ο ο: Ѹ ѹ Ꙋ ꙋ

Other
- Associated numbers: 400 (Cyrillic numerals)

Uk (Ѹ ѹ; italics: Ѹ ѹ) is a digraph of the early Cyrillic alphabet of the letters О and У, although commonly considered and used as a single letter. To save space, it was often written as a vertical ligature (Ꙋ ꙋ), called "monograph Uk". In modern times, ⟨оу⟩ has been replaced by the simple ⟨у⟩. Ѹ is romanized as U, Ꙋ is romanized as Ū.

== Development in Old East Slavic ==
The simplification of the digraph ⟨оу⟩ to ⟨у⟩ was first brought about in Old East Slavic texts and only later taken over into South Slavic languages.

One can see this development in the Novgorod birch-bark letters: The degree to which this letter was used here differed in two positions: in word-initial position or after a vowel (except for the jers), and after a consonant.

After a consonant, ⟨оу⟩ was used 89% of the time in the writings before 1100. By 1200, it was used 61% of the time, with the letter ⟨у⟩ used 14% of the time; by 1300, оу had reached 28%, surpassed by ⟨у⟩ at 45%. From the late 14th century on, there are no more instances of ⟨оу⟩ being used in this position, with ⟨у⟩ appearing 95% of the time.

The decrease in usage was more gradual initially or following a vowel. Although there are no instances of the use of ⟨у⟩ in this position before c. 1200, ⟨оу⟩ gradually decreased from 88% before 1100 to 57% by 1200. The frequency of ⟨оу⟩ remained steady between 47% and 44% until 1400, when it experienced another decrease to 32%. Meanwhile, the use of ⟨у⟩ increased from 4% in the early 13th century, to 20% by the mid-13th century, 38% by the mid-14th century, and 58% by the early 15th century.

The monograph form ꙋ was also used in this region, but it was rare, never being used in more than 34% of letters.

== Church Slavonic ==
Similarly to the letter І, the usage of Uk in Church Slavonic orthography was standardised by Meletius Smotrytsky, who assigned the two different forms (monograph and digraph) different functions. The original ⟨оу⟩ form was to be used at the beginning of words (for example, оучитель) while the monograph ⟨ꙋ⟩ was to be used in the middle and end of words (for example, мꙋжъ, комꙋ). Similarly to the rule for ⟨і⟩, this would be used in most Cyrillic languages until the adoption of the Civil script.

== Representation on computers ==
The letter Uk was first represented in Unicode 1.1.0 as U+0478 and 0479, CYRILLIC CAPITAL/SMALL LETTER UK (Ѹ ѹ). It was later recognized that the glyph to be used for the letter had not been adequately specified, and it had been represented as either a digraph or monograph letter in different released fonts. There was also the difficulty that in written texts the letter may appear in lowercase (оу), uppercase (Оу), or in all caps (ОУ), which is possible to be used for heading.

To resolve this ambiguity, Unicode 5.1 has deprecated the use of the original code points, introduced U+A64A and A64B, CYRILLIC CAPITAL/SMALL LETTER MONOGRAPH UK (Ꙋ ꙋ), and recommends composing the digraph with two individual characters ⟨о⟩+⟨у⟩.

Unicode 9.0 has also introduced U+1C82 CYRILLIC SMALL LETTER NARROW O which can also be used for composing the digraph form (ᲂ+⟨у⟩) and U+1C88 CYRILLIC SMALL LETTER UNBLENDED UK (ᲈ) as a variant of monograph form.

However, the recommended method may cause some text representation problems. The letter У did not originally appear alone in the Old Church Slavonic orthography, and thus its code point was replaced in different Old Slavonic computer fonts with digraph or monograph forms of the Uk or with the tailed form of Izhitsa. Tailed Izhitsa may be used as a part of the digraph, but using the shape of the monograph Uk as a part of the digraph Uk (оꙋ) is incorrect.

The minuscule monograph Uk was used in the Romanian Transitional Alphabet to represent /u/, but due to font restrictions, the Ȣ ligature or Latin gamma are occasionally used instead.

== Computing codes ==
Character information
Preview	Ѹ		ѹ		Ꙋ		ꙋ		ᲈ	
Unicode name	CYRILLIC CAPITAL LETTER UK		CYRILLIC SMALL LETTER UK		CYRILLIC CAPITAL LETTER; MONOGRAPH UK		CYRILLIC SMALL LETTER; MONOGRAPH UK		CYRILLIC SMALL LETTER; UNBLENDED UK	
Encodings	decimal	hex	dec	hex	dec	hex	dec	hex	dec	hex
Unicode	1144	U+0478	1145	U+0479	42570	U+A64A	42571	U+A64B	7304	U+1C88
UTF-8	209 184	D1 B8	209 185	D1 B9	234 153 138	EA 99 8A	234 153 139	EA 99 8B	225 178 136	E1 B2 88
Numeric character reference	&#1144;	&#x478;	&#1145;	&#x479;	&#42570;	&#xA64A;	&#42571;	&#xA64B;	&#7304;	&#x1C88;

== See also ==
- Greek gamma (Γ γ)
- Latin gamma (Ɣ ɣ)
- Close-mid back unrounded vowel (ɤ)
- Ou (ligature) (Ȣ ȣ)
