= Iotated E =

Cyrillic letter

- Ѥ ѥ

Usage
- Writing system: Cyrillic
- Type: Alphabetic
- Language of origin: Old Church Slavonic
- Sound values: jɛ
- In Unicode: U+0464, U+0465

Iotated E or Iotated Ukrainian Ye also known as Iye(Ѥ ѥ) is a letter of the Cyrillic script, and it is used in the Church Slavonic language and Early Cyrillic.

== History ==
Iotated E has no equivalent in the Glagolitic alphabet, and probably originated as a ligature of ⟨і⟩ and ⟨е⟩ to represent the sounds [je] or [jɛ].

== Usage ==
Iotated E is found in some of the very oldest examples of Cyrillic writing, such as the tenth-century Mostich inscription or the Codex Suprasliensis, whereas in others, such as the Enina Apostle or Undol'skij Fragments, it is not present at all. It is plentifully attested in medieval manuscripts of both South Slavic and East Slavic provenance, co-existing with ⟨є⟩, which fulfils the same function. Orthographic practice nevertheless varies: some manuscripts use all three characters, some ⟨е⟩ and ⟨ѥ⟩, some ⟨е⟩ and ⟨є⟩, and some only ⟨е⟩.

Among the Eastern Slavs ⟨ѥ⟩ fell into disuse after the end of the fourteenth century, and it is not therefore represented in printed books from this area, or in modern Church Slavonic. In the South, however, it survived, and was used in the first Serbian printed book, the Octoechos (Oktoih prvoglasnik) of 1474, and appears in the Serbian abecedarium printed in Venice in 1597; its position in the alphabet in this book is between ⟨ю⟩ and ⟨ѯ⟩. It continued to be used in both manuscript and printed material throughout the sixteenth and seventeenth centuries, but it no longer appears in the alphabet in M. Karaman's abecedarium of 1753. In certain orthographical variants of Bulgarian, it can be found at least up to the middle of the 19th century. Bulgarian variants from the 1800s often include the letter as a ligature of ⟨І⟩ and ⟨Е⟩, rather than ⟨Є⟩. The sound of Ѥ is written using the letters Ye (Е) or Ukrainian Ye (Є) in east Slavic languages. South Slavic languages usually use the combinations ⟨је⟩ or ⟨йе⟩.

== Computing codes ==
Character information
Preview	Ѥ		ѥ	
Unicode name	CYRILLIC CAPITAL LETTER; IOTIFIED E		CYRILLIC SMALL LETTER; IOTIFIED E	
Encodings	decimal	hex	dec	hex
Unicode	1124	U+0464	1125	U+0465
UTF-8	209 164	D1 A4	209 165	D1 A5
Numeric character reference	&#1124;	&#x464;	&#1125;	&#x465;
