= Iotated A =

Cyrillic letter

Іotated A
- Ꙗ ꙗ

Usage
- Writing system: Cyrillic
- Type: Alphabetic

Other
- Associated numbers: 1000 (Cyrillic numerals)

Iotated A (Ꙗ, ꙗ) is a letter of the Cyrillic script, built as a ligature of the letters І and А, and used today only in Church Slavonic. It is unusual among early Cyrillic letters in having no direct counterpart in Glagolitic: Ⱑ (jat’) is used for both /ě/ and /ja/. Accordingly, many early Cyrillic texts (particularly those with Glagolitic antecedents) may use Ѣ for both these purposes; this practice continued into the fourteenth century, but was much more common in the South Slavonic than the East Slavonic area. Nevertheless, Ꙗ is attested in the earliest extant Cyrillic writings, including for example the Codex Suprasliensis and Savvina Kniga.

It continued in use in Serbian until the orthographical reforms of Vuk Karadžić, and in Bulgarian (where it also acquired a civil script glyph variant) until the late nineteenth century. However it was never included in the Russian civil script of Peter I. Among the Eastern Slavs, the denasalisation of [ę], probably to [æ], and the subsequent coalescence of this sound with the /a/ phoneme meant that the letter Ѧ acquired the same function as Ꙗ, and the two came to be regarded as variants of the same letter. This is still the case in modern Church Slavonic, where, broadly speaking, Ꙗ is used initially and Ѧ elsewhere, though exceptionally they may be used to make other distinctions, such as that between ѧ҆зы́къ 'tongue' and ꙗ҆зы́къ 'people'.

Iotated A, both capital and lowercase forms (variant of civil script).

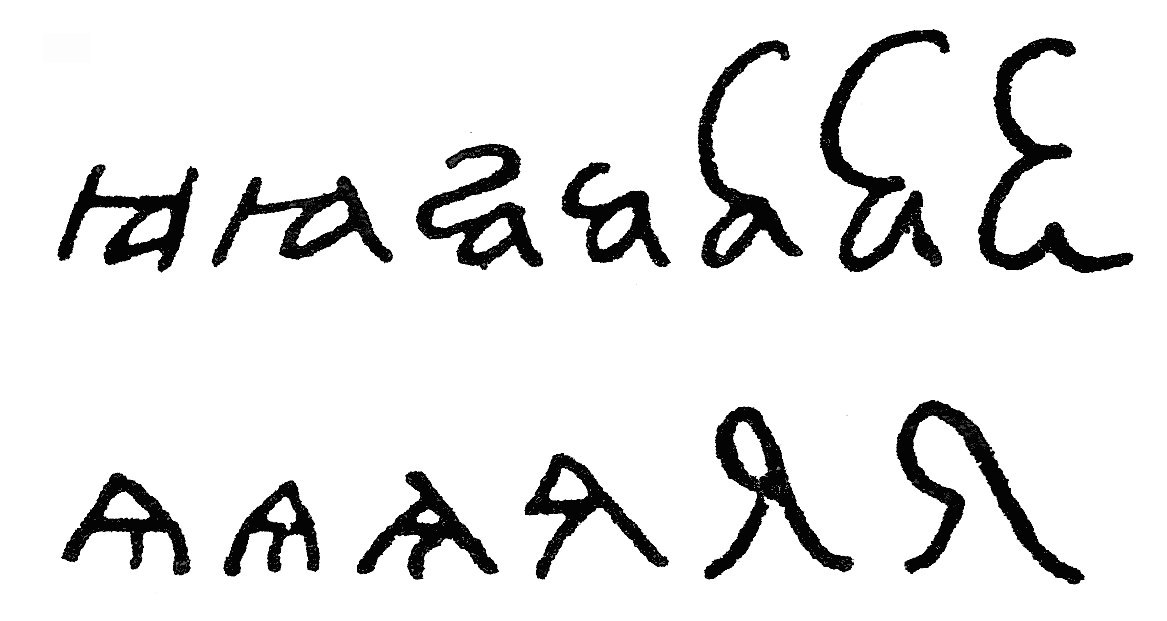
Evolution of iotated A and Little Yus.

Lowercase form of iotated a (Ukrainian variant).

Cursive form of iotated a.

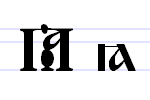
Iotated a in Early Cyrillic style.

In cursive, the letter was modified: the left side was gradually lost, turning only into a flourish, so it began to look like an 'а' with a 'с'-shaped tail at the top left (a similar metamorphosis occurred with the cursive 'Ю').

== Computing codes ==
Character information
Preview	Ꙗ		ꙗ	
Unicode name	CYRILLIC CAPITAL LETTER; IOTIFIED A		CYRILLIC SMALL LETTER; IOTIFIED A	
Encodings	decimal	hex	dec	hex
Unicode	42582	U+A656	42583	U+A657
UTF-8	234 153 150	EA 99 96	234 153 151	EA 99 97
Numeric character reference	&#42582;	&#xA656;	&#42583;	&#xA657;
