= Early Cyrillic alphabet =

Writing system developed in 9th century Bulgaria

Early Cyrillic alphabet Словѣньска азъбоукꙑ
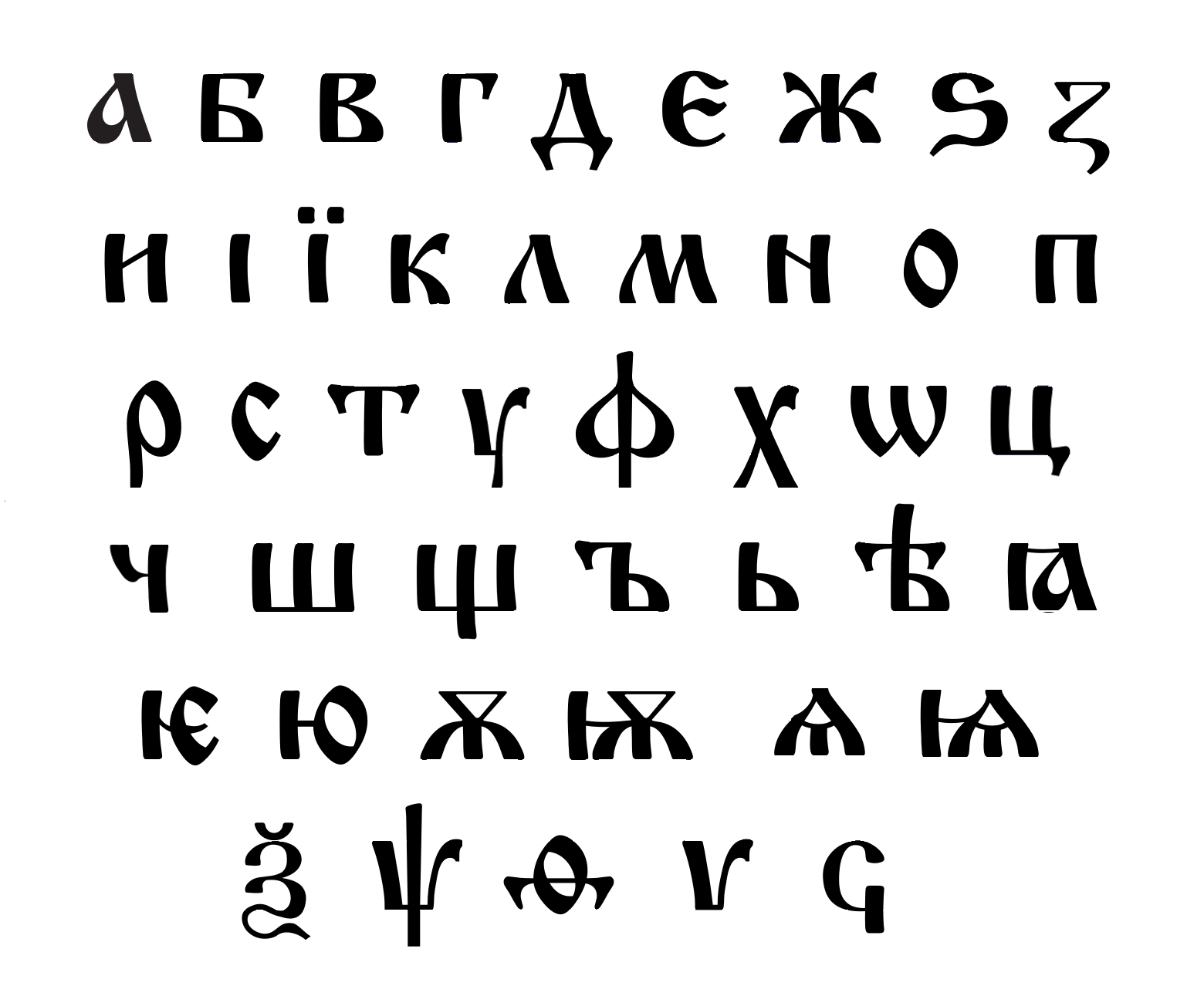
- Script type: Alphabet
- Period: From c. 893 in Bulgaria
- Direction: Varies
- Languages: Old Church Slavonic, Church Slavonic, old versions of many Slavic languages

Related scripts
- Parent systems: Egyptian hieroglyphs: Phoenician alphabet; Greek alphabet (with influence from the Glagolitic alphabet); Early Cyrillic alphabet
- Child systems: Cyrillic script
- Sister systems: Latin alphabet Coptic alphabet Armenian alphabet

ISO 15924
- ISO 15924: Cyrs (221), Cyrillic (Old Church Slavonic variant)

Unicode
- Unicode range: U+0400–U+04FF Cyrillic; U+0500–U+052F Cyrillic Supplement; U+2DE0–U+2DFF Cyrillic Extended-A; U+A640–U+A69F Cyrillic Extended-B; U+1C80–U+1C8F Cyrillic Extended-C

The Early Cyrillic alphabet, also called classical Cyrillic or paleo-Cyrillic, is an alphabetic writing system that was developed in Bulgaria in the Preslav Literary School during the late 9th century. The systematization of Cyrillic may have been undertaken at the Council of Preslav in 893. It is used to write the Church Slavonic language, and was historically used for its ancestor, Old Church Slavonic.

It was also used for other languages, but between the 18th and 20th centuries was mostly replaced by the modern Cyrillic script, which is used for some Slavic languages (such as Russian), and for East European and Asian languages that have experienced a great amount of Russian cultural influence.

== History ==
The Glagolitic script was created by the Byzantine monk Saint Cyril, possibly with the aid of his brother Saint Methodius, around 863. Most scholars agree that Cyrillic, on the other hand, was created by Cyril's students at the Preslav Literary School in the 890s as a more suitable script for church books, based on uncial Greek but retaining some Glagolitic letters for sounds not present in Greek. At the time, the Preslav Literary School was the most important early literary and cultural center of the First Bulgarian Empire and of all Slavs.

The earliest form of manuscript Cyrillic is known as Ustav. The earliest Cyrillic texts are found in northeastern Bulgaria, in the vicinity of Preslav—the Krepcha inscription, dating back to 921, and a ceramic vase from Preslav, dating back to 931. Moreover, unlike the other literary centre in the First Bulgarian Empire, the Ohrid Literary School, which continued to use the Glagolitic script well into the 12th century, the School at Preslav was using Cyrillic in the early 900s. The systematization of Cyrillic may have been undertaken at the Council of Preslav in 893, when the Old Church Slavonic or Glagolitic Cyrillic liturgy was adopted by the First Bulgarian Empire.

Unlike the Churchmen in Ohrid, Preslav scholars were much more dependent upon Greek models and quickly abandoned the Glagolitic scripts in favor of an adaptation of the Greek uncial to the needs of Slavic, which is now known as the Cyrillic alphabet.

American scholar Horace Lunt has alternatively suggested that Cyrillics emerged in the border regions of Greek proselytization to the Slavs before it was codified and adapted by some systematizer among the Slavs. The oldest Cyrillic manuscripts look very similar to 9th and 10th century Greek uncial manuscripts, and the majority of uncial Cyrillic letters were identical to their Greek uncial counterparts.

The early Cyrillic alphabet was very well suited for the writing of Old Church Slavic, generally following a principle of "one letter for one significant sound", with some arbitrary or phonotactically-based exceptions. Particularly, this principle is violated by certain vowel letters, which represent [j] plus the vowel if they are not preceded by a consonant. It is also violated by a significant failure to distinguish between /ji/ and /jĭ/ orthographically. There was no distinction of capital and lowercase letters, though manuscript letters were rendered larger for emphasis, or in various decorative initial and nameplate forms. Letters served as numerals as well as phonetic signs; the values of the numerals were directly borrowed from their Greek-letter analogues. Letters without Greek equivalents mostly had no numeral values, whereas one letter, koppa, had only a numeric value with no phonetic value. Since its creation, the Cyrillic script has adapted to changes in spoken language and developed regional variations to suit the features of national languages. It has been the subject of academic reforms and political decrees. Variations of the Cyrillic script are used to write languages throughout Eastern Europe and Asia.

The form of the Russian alphabet underwent a change when Tsar Peter the Great introduced the civil script (Russian: гражданский шрифт, romanized: graždanskiy šrift, or гражданка, graždanka), in contrast to the prevailing church typeface, (Russian: церковнославя́нский шрифт, romanized: cerkovnoslavjanskiy šrift) in 1708. (The two forms are sometimes distinguished as paleo-Cyrillic and neo-Cyrillic.) Some letters and breathing marks which were used only for historical reasons were dropped. Medieval letterforms used in typesetting were harmonized with Latin typesetting practices, exchanging medieval forms for Baroque ones, and skipping the western European Renaissance developments. The reform subsequently influenced Cyrillic orthographies for most other languages. Today, the early orthography and typesetting standards remain in use only in Slavonic. A comprehensive repertoire of early Cyrillic characters has been included in the Unicode standard since version 5.1, published April 4, 2008. These characters and their distinctive letterforms are represented in specialized computer fonts for Slavistics.

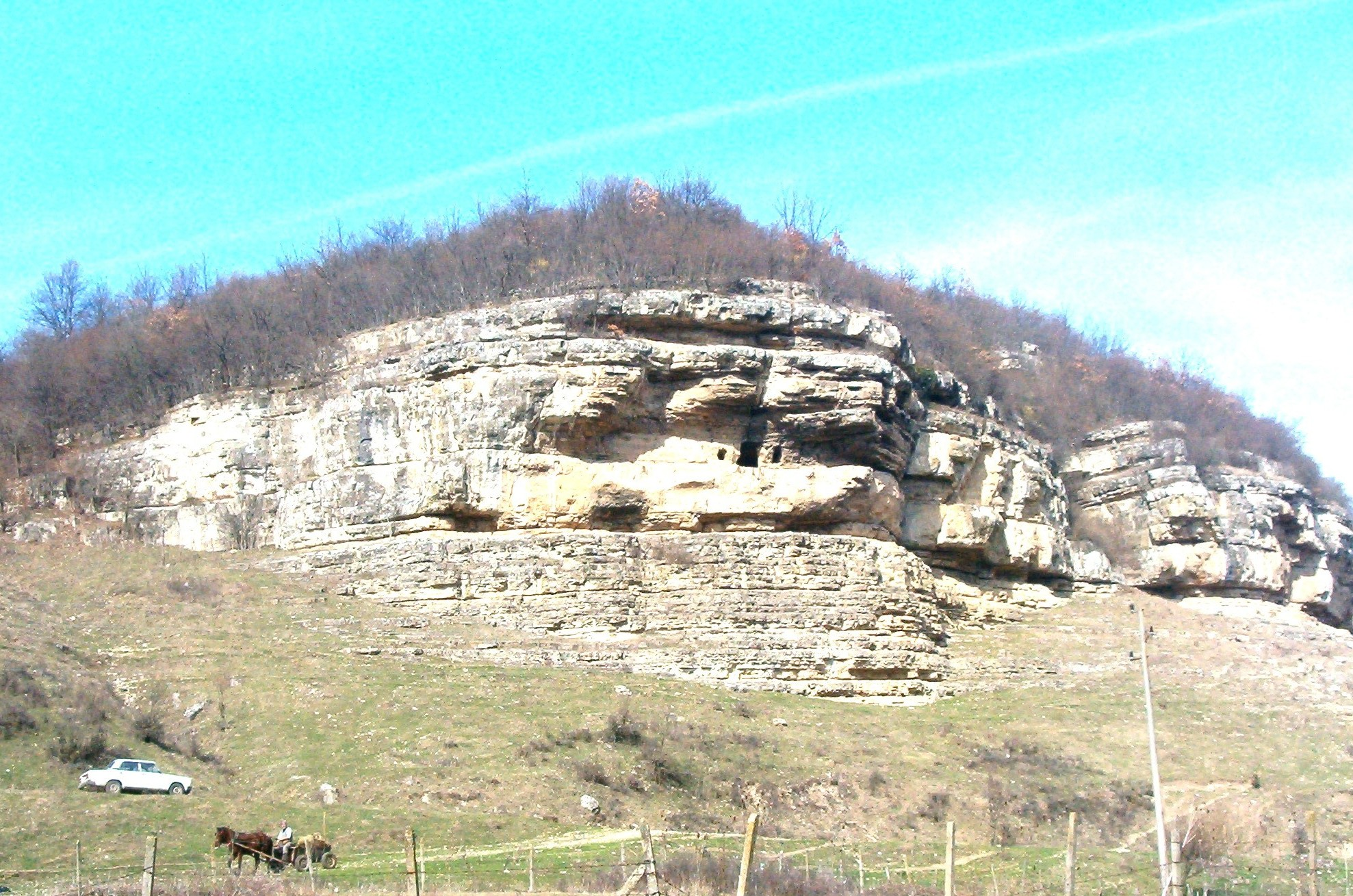
View of the cave monastery near the village of Krepcha, Opaka Municipality in Bulgaria. Here is the oldest Cyrillic inscription dated of 921.

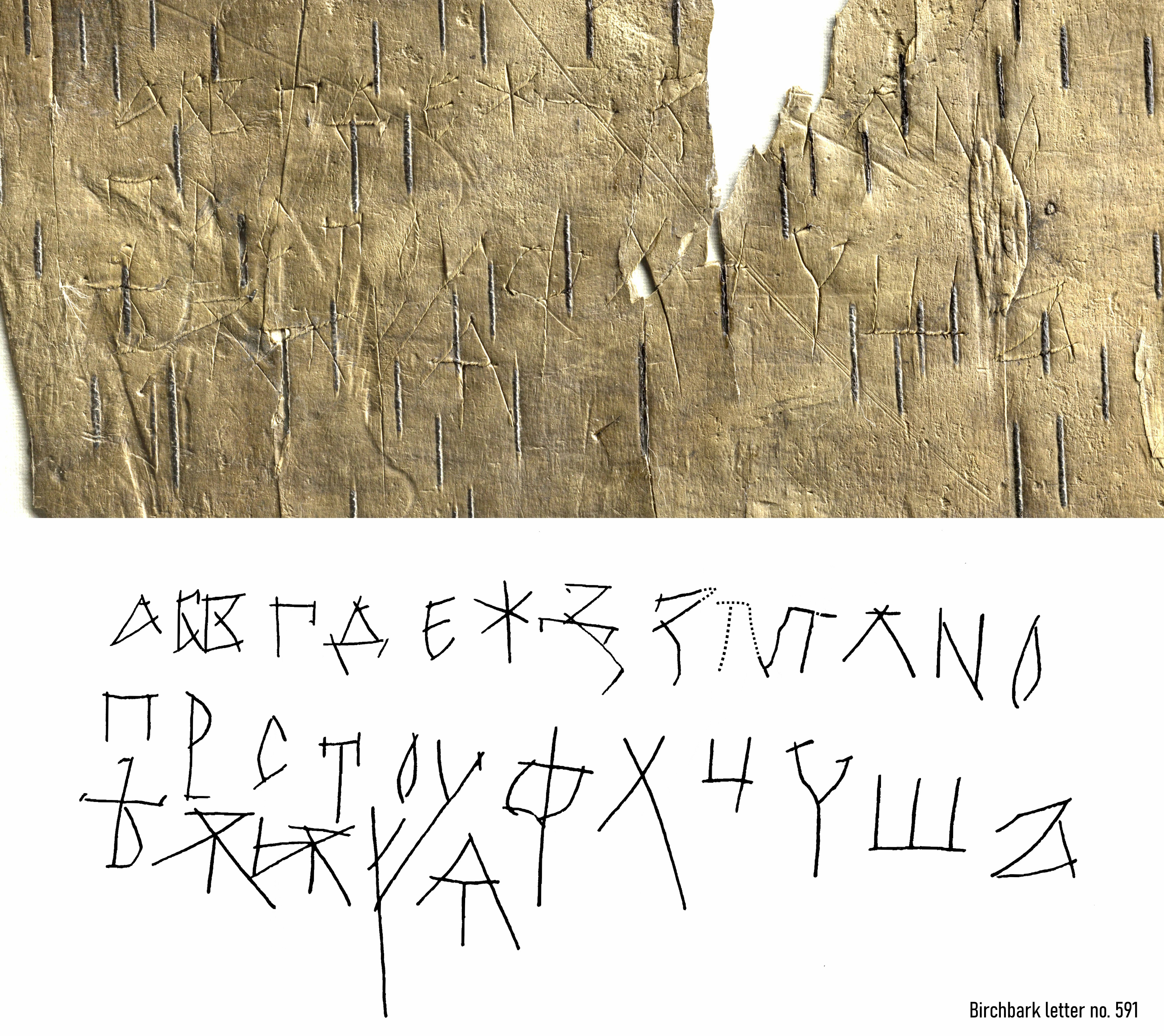
The Cyrillic alphabet on birch bark document № 591 from ancient Novgorod (Russia). Dated to 1025–1050 AD.

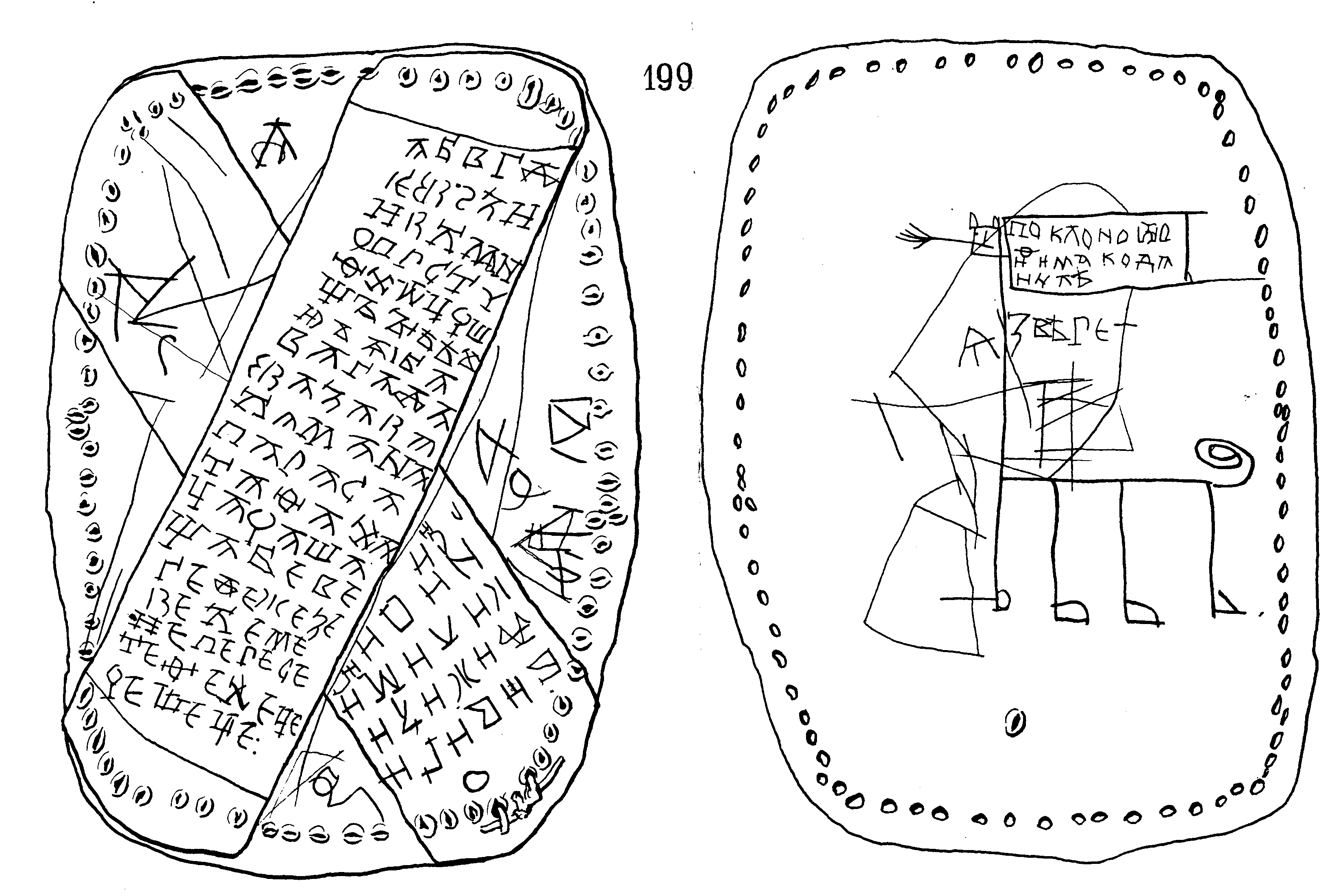
A more complete early Cyrillic abecedary (on the top half of the left side), this one written by the boy Onfim between 1240 and 1260 AD (birch bark document № 199).

== Alphabet ==
Image	Unicode	Name (Cyrillic)	Name (translit.)	Name (IPA)	Trans.	IPA	Numeric value	Origin	Meaning of name	Notes
	А а	азъ	azŭ	[azŭ]	a	[a]	1	Greek alpha Α	I	
	Б б	боукꙑ	buky	[bukɯ]	b	[b]		Greek beta in Thera form	letters	
	В в	вѣдѣ	vědě	[vædæ]	v	[v]	2	Greek beta Β	know	
	Г г	глаголи	glagoli	[ɡlaɡoli]	g	[ɡ]	3	Greek gamma Γ	speak	When marked with a palatalization mark, this letter is pronounced [ɟ]; this only occurs rarely, and only in borrowings.
	Д д	добро	dobro	[dobro]	d	[d]	4	Greek delta Δ	good	
	Є є	єстъ	estŭ	[jɛstŭ]	e	[ɛ]	5	Greek epsilon Ε	is	Pronounced [jɛ] when not preceded by a consonant.
	Ж ж	живѣтє	živěte	[ʒivætɛ]	ž, zh	[ʒ]		Glagolitic zhivete Ⰶ	live	
	Ѕ ѕ / Ꙃ ꙃ	ꙃѣло	dzělo	[d͡zælo]	dz, ʒ, ẑ	[dz]	6	Greek stigma Ϛ	very	The form ꙃ had the phonetic value [dz] and no numeral value, whereas the form ѕ was used only as a numeral and had no phonetic value. Since the 12th century, ѕ came to be used instead of ꙃ. In many manuscripts з is used instead, suggesting lenition had taken place.
	З з / Ꙁ ꙁ	зємл҄ꙗ	zemlja	[zɛmʎa]	z	[z]	7	Greek zeta Ζ	earth	The first form developed into the second.
	И и	ижє	iže	[jiʒɛ]	i	[i]	8	Greek eta Η	which	Pronounced [ji] or [jĭ] when not preceded by a consonant and not the particle ‹i› ("and"); the orthography does not distinguish between [ji] and [jĭ]. Speculatively, this letter might have originally been intended to represent [i] and [ji].
	І і / Ї ї	и	i	[i]	i, ı, ì	[i]	10	Greek iota Ι	and	Pronounced [ji] or [jĭ] when not preceded by a consonant and not the particle ‹i› ("and"); the orthography does not distinguish between [ji] and [jĭ]. Speculatively, this letter might have originally been intended to represent [jĭ].
	К к	како	kako	[kako]	k	[k]	20	Greek kappa Κ	as	When marked with a palatalization mark, this letter is pronounced [c]; this only occurs rarely, and only in borrowings.
	Л л	людиѥ	ljudije	[ʎudijɛ]	l	[l]; sometimes [ʎ]	30	Greek lambda Λ	people	When marked with a palatalization mark or followed by a palatalizing vowel (ю, ѭ, or ꙗ, and sometimes ѣ), this letter is pronounced [ʎ]; some manuscripts do not mark palatalization, in which case it must be inferred from context.
	М м	мꙑслитє	myslite	[mɯslitɛ]	m	[m]	40	Greek mu Μ	think	
	Н н	нашь	našĭ	[naʃĭ]	n	[n]; sometimes [ɲ]	50	Greek nu Ν	ours	When marked with a palatalization mark or followed by a palatalizing vowel (ю, ѭ, or ꙗ, and sometimes ѣ), this letter is pronounced [ɲ]; some manuscripts do not mark palatalization, in which case it must be inferred from context.
	О о	онъ	onŭ	[onŭ]	o	[o]	70	Greek omicron Ο	he/it	
	П п	покои	pokoi	[pokojĭ]	p	[p]	80	Greek pi Π	peace/calm	
	Р р	рьци	rĭci	[rĭt͡si]	r	[r]; sometimes [rʲ]	100	Greek rho Ρ	say	When marked with a palatalization mark or followed by a palatalizing vowel (ю or ѭ), this letter is pronounced [rʲ]; some manuscripts do not mark palatalization, in which case it must be inferred from context. This palatalization was lost rather early in South Slavic speech.
	С с	слово	slovo	[slovo]	s	[s]	200	Greek lunate sigma Ϲ	word/speech	
	Т т	тврьдо	tvrĭdo	[tvrĭdo]	t	[t]	300	Greek tau Τ	hard/surely	
	Оу оу / Ꙋ ꙋ	оукъ	ukŭ	[ukŭ]	u	[u]	400	Greek omicron-upsilon ΟΥ / Ꙋ	learning	The first form developed into the second, a vertical ligature. A less common alternative form was a digraph with izhitsa: Оѵ оѵ.
	Ф ф	фрьтъ	frĭtŭ	[frĭtŭ]	f	[f] or possibly [p]	500	Greek phi Φ		This letter was not needed for Slavic but used to transcribe Greek Φ and Latin ph and f. It was probably, but not certainly, pronounced as [f] rather than [p]; however, in some cases it has been found as a transcription of Greek π.
	Х х	хѣръ	xěrŭ	[xærŭ]	kh, x, h	[x]	600	Greek chi Χ		When marked with a palatalization mark, this letter is pronounced [ç]; this only occurs rarely, and only in borrowings.
	Ѡ ѡ	отъ	otŭ	[otŭ]	ō, w, o, ô	[o]	800	Greek omega ω	from	This letter was rarely used, mostly appearing in the interjection "oh", in the preposition ‹otŭ›, in Greek transcription, and as a decorative capital.
	Ц ц	ци	ci	[t͡si]	c	[ts]	900	Glagolitic tsi Ⱌ		
	Ч ч	чрьвь	črĭvĭ	[t͡ʃrĭvĭ]	č, ch	[tʃ]	90	Glagolitic cherv Ⱍ	worm	This letter replaced koppa as the numeral for 90 after about 1300.
	Ш ш	ша	ša	[ʃa]	š, sh	[ʃ]		Glagolitic sha Ⱎ		
	Щ щ	ща	šta	[ʃta]	št, sht	[ʃt]		Glagolitic shta Ⱋ		This letter varied in pronunciation from region to region; it may have originally represented the reflexes of [tʲ]. It was sometimes replaced by the digraph шт. Pronounced [ʃtʃ] in Old East Slavic. Later analyzed as a Ш-Т ligature by folk etymology, but neither the Cyrillic nor the Glagolitic glyph originated as such a ligature.
	Ъ ъ	ѥръ	jerŭ	[jɛrŭ]	ŭ, ъ	[ŭ] or [ʊ]		Glagolitic yer Ⱏ		After č, š, ž, c, dz, št, and žd, this letter was pronounced identically to ь instead of its normal pronunciation.
	Ꙑ ꙑ / Ъи ъи	ѥрꙑ	jery	[jɛrɯ]	y	[ɯ] or [ɯji] or [ɯjĭ]		Ъ + І or Ъ + И ligature.		Ꙑ was the more common form; rarely, a third form, ы, appears.
	Ь ь	ѥрь	jerĭ	[jɛrĭ]	ĭ, ь	[ĭ] or [ɪ]		Glagolitic yerj Ⱐ		
	Ѣ ѣ	ѣть	ětĭ	[jætĭ]	ě	[æ]		Glagolitic yat Ⱑ		In western South Slavic dialects of Old Church Slavonic, this letter had a more closed pronunciation, perhaps [ɛ] or [e]. This letter was only written after a consonant; in all other positions, ꙗ was used instead.
	Ꙗ ꙗ	ꙗ	ja	[ja]	ja	[ja]		І-А ligature		This letter was probably not present in the original Cyrillic alphabet. Evolved into Я.
	Ѥ ѥ	ѥ	je	[jɛ]	je	[jɛ]		І-Є ligature		This letter was probably not present in the original Cyrillic alphabet. Evolved into E.
	Ю ю	ю	ju	[ju]	ju	[ju]		І-ОУ ligature, dropping У		There was no [jo] sound in early Slavic, so І-ОУ did not need to be distinguished from І-О. After č, š, ž, c, dz, št, and žd, this letter was pronounced [u], without iotation.
	Ѫ ѫ	ѫсъ	ǫsŭ	[ɔ̃sŭ]	ǫ, õ	[ɔ̃]		Glagolitic ons Ⱘ		
	Ѭ ѭ	ѭсъ	jǫsŭ	[jɔ̃sŭ]	jǫ, jõ	[jɔ̃, ja]		І-Ѫ ligature		After č, š, ž, c, dz, št, and žd, this letter was pronounced [ɔ̃], without iotation.
	Ѧ ѧ	ѧсъ	ęsŭ	[ɛ̃sŭ]	ę, ẽ	[ɛ̃]	900	Glagolitic ens Ⱔ		Pronounced [jɛ̃] when not preceded by a consonant.
	Ѩ ѩ	ѩсъ	jęsŭ	[jɛ̃sŭ]	ję, jẽ	[jɛ̃]		І-Ѧ ligature		This letter does not exist in the oldest (South Slavic) Cyrillic manuscripts, but only in East Slavic ones. It was probably not present in the original Cyrillic alphabet.
	Ѯ ѯ	ѯи	ksi	[ksi]	ks	[ks]	60	Greek xi Ξ		These two letters were not needed for Slavic but were used to transcribe Greek and as numerals.
	Ѱ ѱ	ѱи	psi	[psi]	ps	[ps]	700	Greek psi Ψ		These two letters were not needed for Slavic but were used to transcribe Greek and as numerals.
	Ѳ ѳ	фита	fita	[fita]	θ, th, T, F	[t], or possibly [θ]	9	Greek theta Θ		This letter was not needed for Slavic but was used to transcribe Greek and as a numeral. It seems to have been generally pronounced [t], as the oldest texts sometimes replace instances of it with т. Normal Old Church Slavonic pronunciation probably did not have a phone [θ].
	Ѵ ѵ	ижица	ižica	[jiʒit͡sa]	ü, v, ỳ	[i], [y], [v]	400	Greek upsilon Υ	small yoke	This letter was used to transcribe Greek upsilon and as a numeral. It also formed part of the digraph оѵ.
	Ҁ ҁ	копа	kopa	[kopa]	q	no sound value	90	Greek koppa Ϙ		This letter had no phonetic value, and was only used as a numeral. After about 1300, it was replaced as a numeral by črĭvĭ.

Djerv (ꙉєрвъ: Ꙉ ꙉ), predecessor to Ћ ћ and Ђ ђ in early Serbian monuments

In addition to the basic letters, there were a number of scribal variations, combining ligatures, and regionalisms used (for example, the additional letter ꙉ, which was used officially by the Serbians), all of which varied over time.

Versions of this initial alphabet where the letters ҁ and ѿ are omitted are also valid, since ҁ did not have a phonetic value nor an official placement in the alphabet with some putting it between п and р to correspond with the placement of the Greek letter ϙ and other putting it right at the end, and ѿ came later as ligature of ѡ and т. The Greek letters that were used in Cyrillic mainly for their numeric value are sometimes transcribed with the corresponding Greek letters for accuracy: ѳ = θ, ѯ = ξ, ѵ = υ, ҁ = ϙ, ѱ = ψ, and ѡ = ω.

== Numerals, diacritics and punctuation ==
Each letter had a numeric value also, inherited from the corresponding Greek letter. A titlo over a sequence of letters indicated their use as a number; usually this was accompanied by a dot on either side of the letter. In numerals, the ones place was to the left of the tens place, the reverse of the order used in modern Arabic numerals. Thousands are formed using a special symbol, ҂ (U+0482), which was attached to the lower left corner of the numeral. Many fonts display this symbol incorrectly as being in line with the letters instead of subscripted below and to the left of them.

Titlos were also used to form abbreviations, especially of nomina sacra; this was done by writing the first and last letter of the abbreviated word along with the word's grammatical endings, then placing a titlo above it. Later manuscripts made increasing use of a different style of abbreviation, in which some of the left-out letters were superscripted above the abbreviation and covered with a pokrytie diacritic. Several diacritics, adopted from Polytonic Greek orthography, were also used, but were seemingly redundant (these may not appear correctly in all web browsers; they are supposed to be directly above the letter, not off to its upper right):

а̀ varia (grave accent), indicating stress on the last syllable (U+0300)
а́ oksia (acute accent), indicating a stressed syllable (U+0301)
ї trema, diaeresis (U+0308)
а̑ kamora (circumflex accent), indicating long falling accent (U+0311); in later Church Slavonic, it disambiguates plurals from homophonous singulars.
а҃ titlo, indicating abbreviations, or letters used as numerals (U+0483)
л҄ palatalization sign, indicating palatalization (U+0484)
а҅ dasia or dasy pneuma, rough breathing mark (U+0485)
а҆ psili, zvatel'tse or psilon pneuma, smooth breathing mark (U+0486). Signals a word-initial vowel, at least in later Church Slavonic.
а҇ pokrytie, indicating an abbreviation (U+0487).
а҆̀ combined psili and varia is called apostrof.
а҆́ combined psili and oksia is called iso.
д̾, д꙽ Yerok (U+033E) and payerok (U+A67D), indicating an omitted jerŭ (ъ) after a letter.

Punctuation systems in early Cyrillic manuscripts were primitive: there was no space between words and no upper and lower case, and punctuation marks were used inconsistently in all manuscripts.

· ano teleia (U+0387), a middle dot used to separate phrases, words, or parts of words
. Full stop, used in the same way
։ Armenian full stop (U+0589), resembling a colon, used in the same way
჻ Georgian paragraph separator (U+10FB), used to mark off larger divisions
⁖ triangular colon (U+2056, added in Unicode 4.1), used to mark off larger divisions
⁘ diamond colon (U+2058, added in Unicode 4.1), used to mark off larger divisions
⁙ quintuple colon (U+2059, added in Unicode 4.1), used to mark off larger divisions
; Greek question mark (U+037E), similar to a semicolon

Some of these marks are also used in Glagolitic script. Used only in modern texts

, comma (U+002C)
. full stop (U+002E)
! exclamation mark (U+0021)

== Gallery ==
=== Old Bulgarian examples ===
Pictures of Old Bulgarian manuscripts and inscriptions

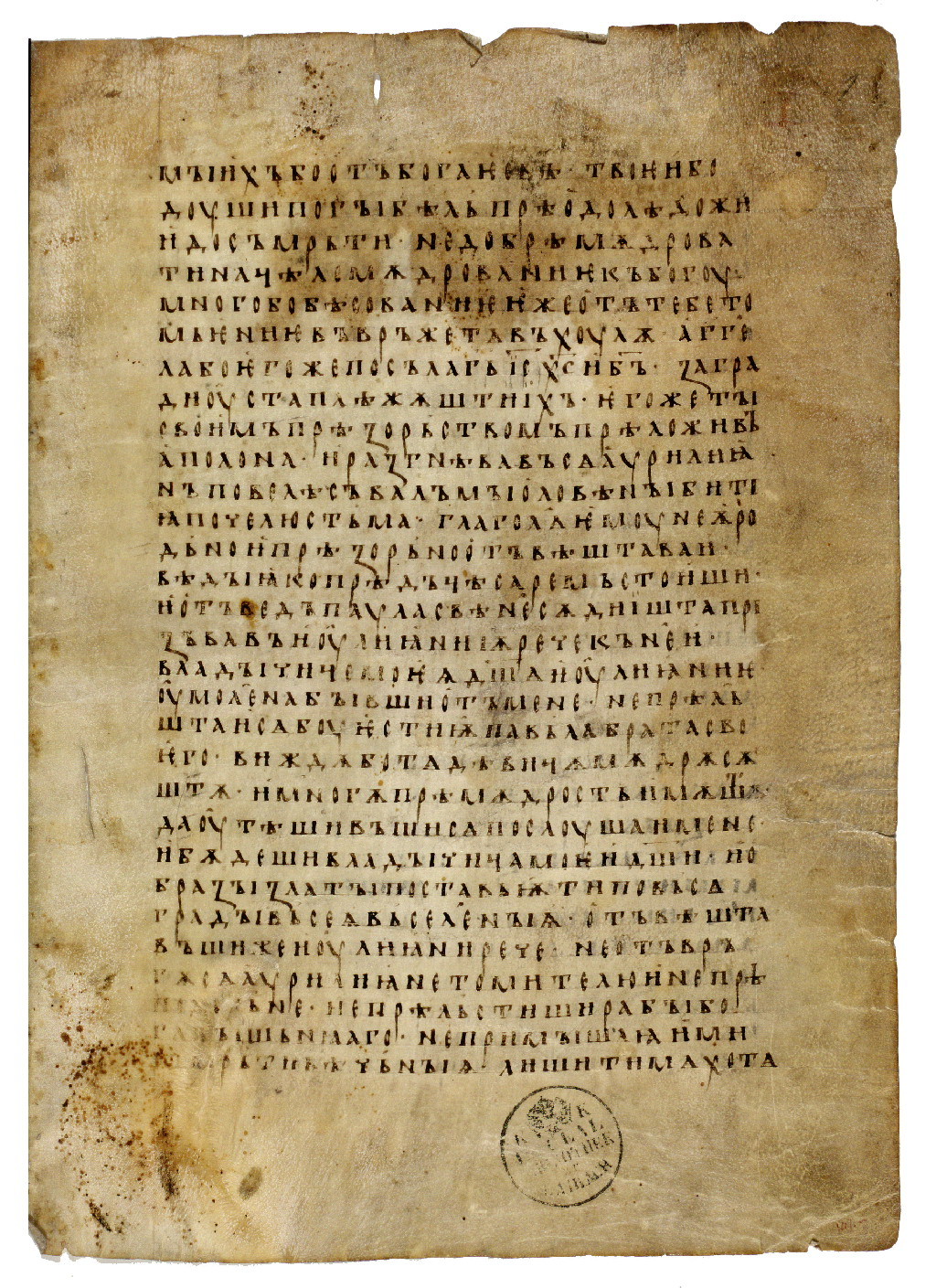
Codex Suprasliensis

Gospels of Tsar Ivan Alexander

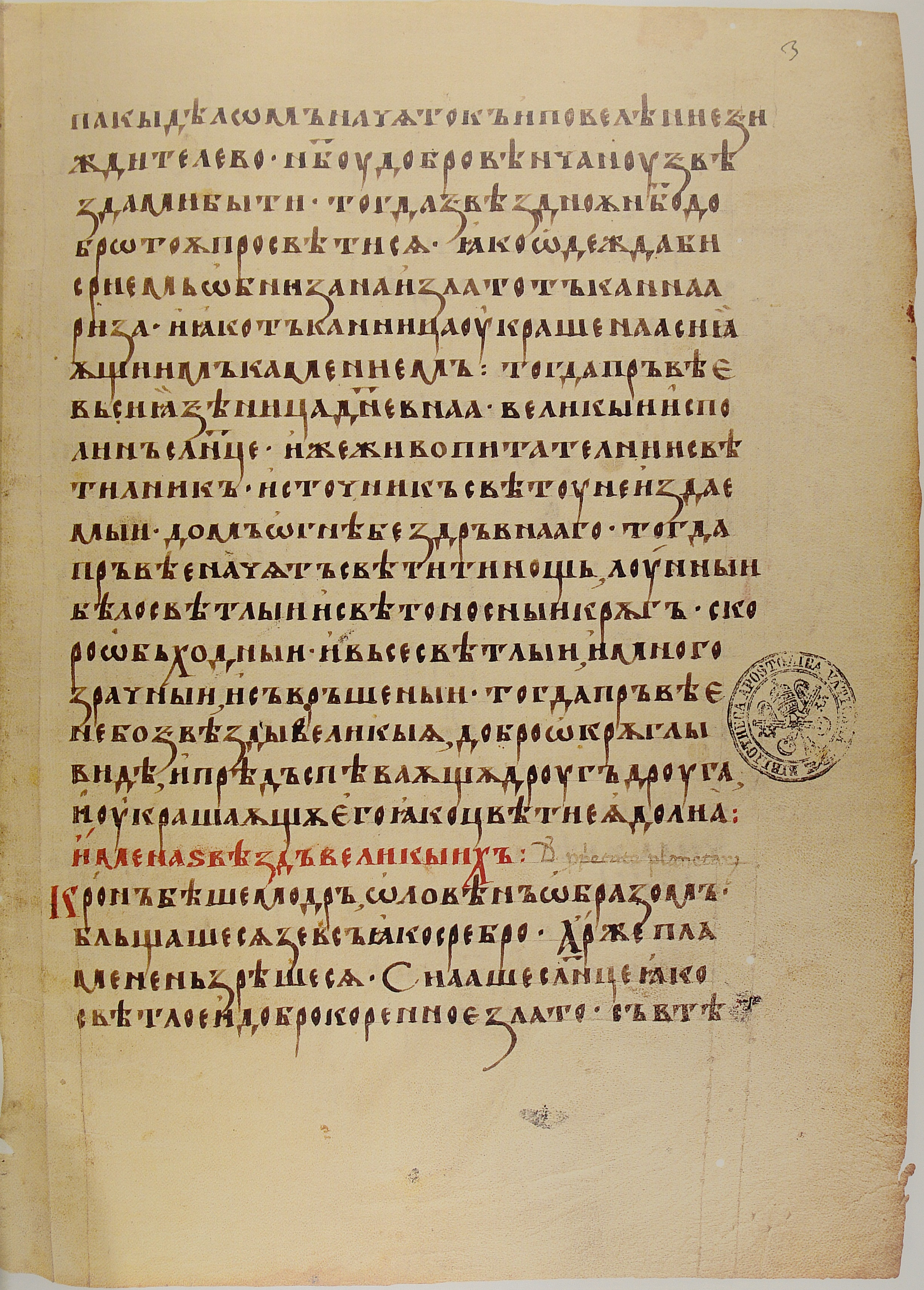
Bulgar translation of Manasses chronicle

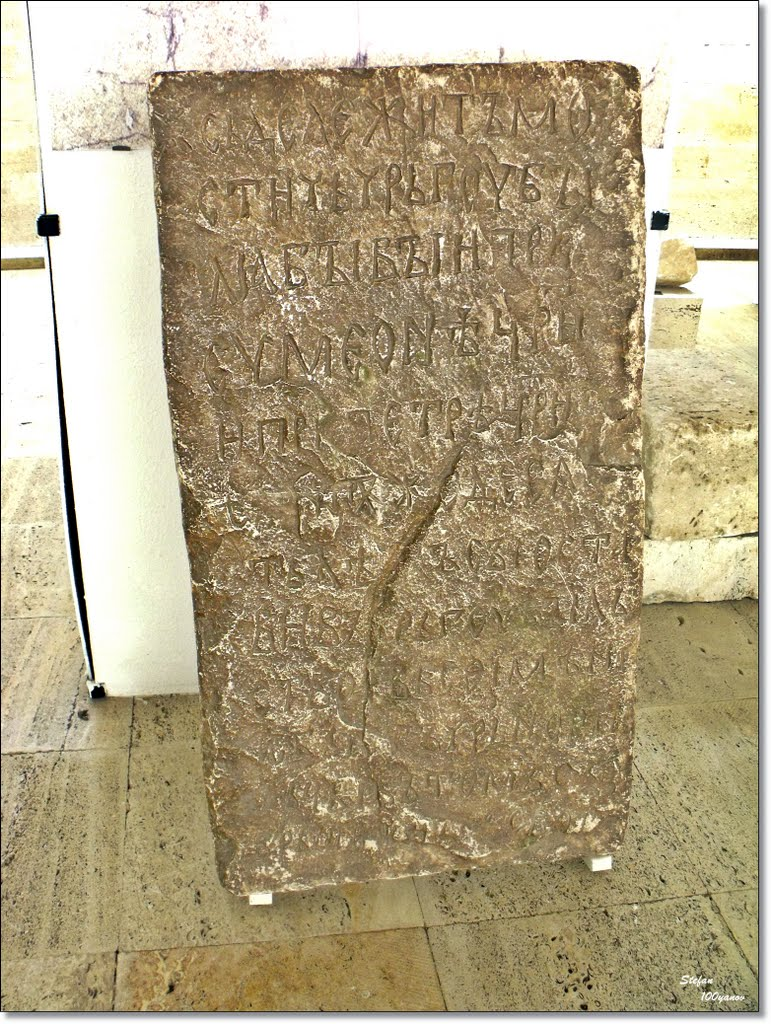
Mostich tomb stone

=== Medieval Greek Uncial manuscripts from which early Cyrillic letter forms take their shapes ===
Pictures of uncial lectionaries

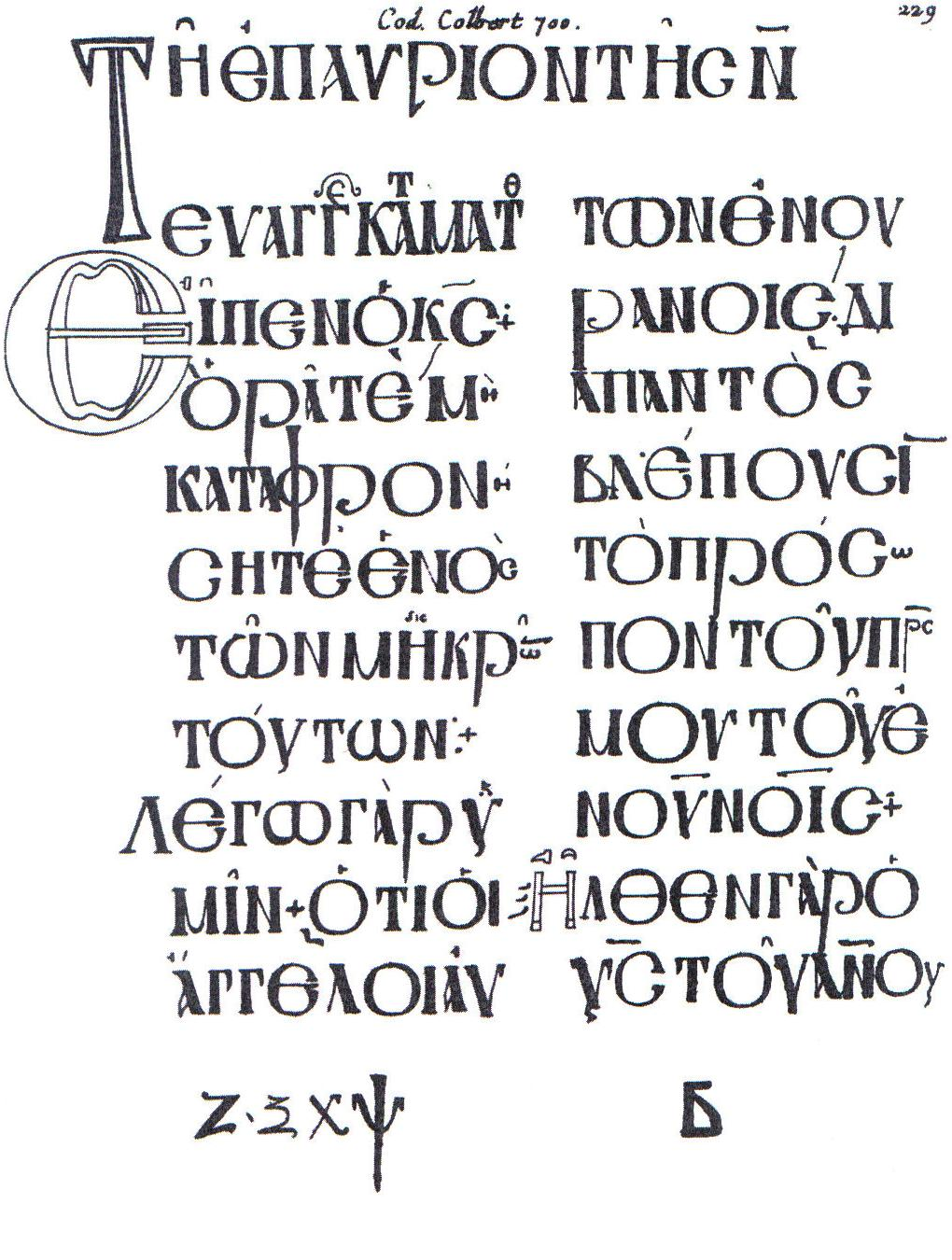
ℓ 1

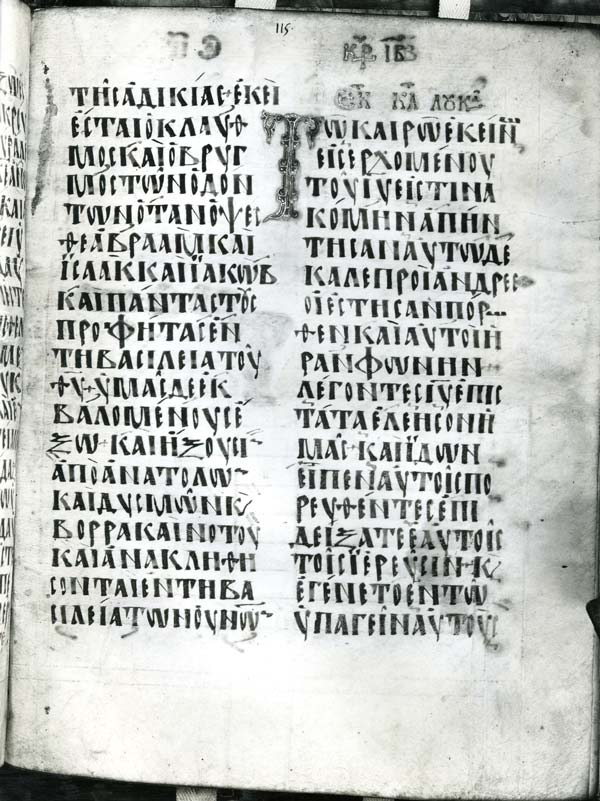
ℓ 5

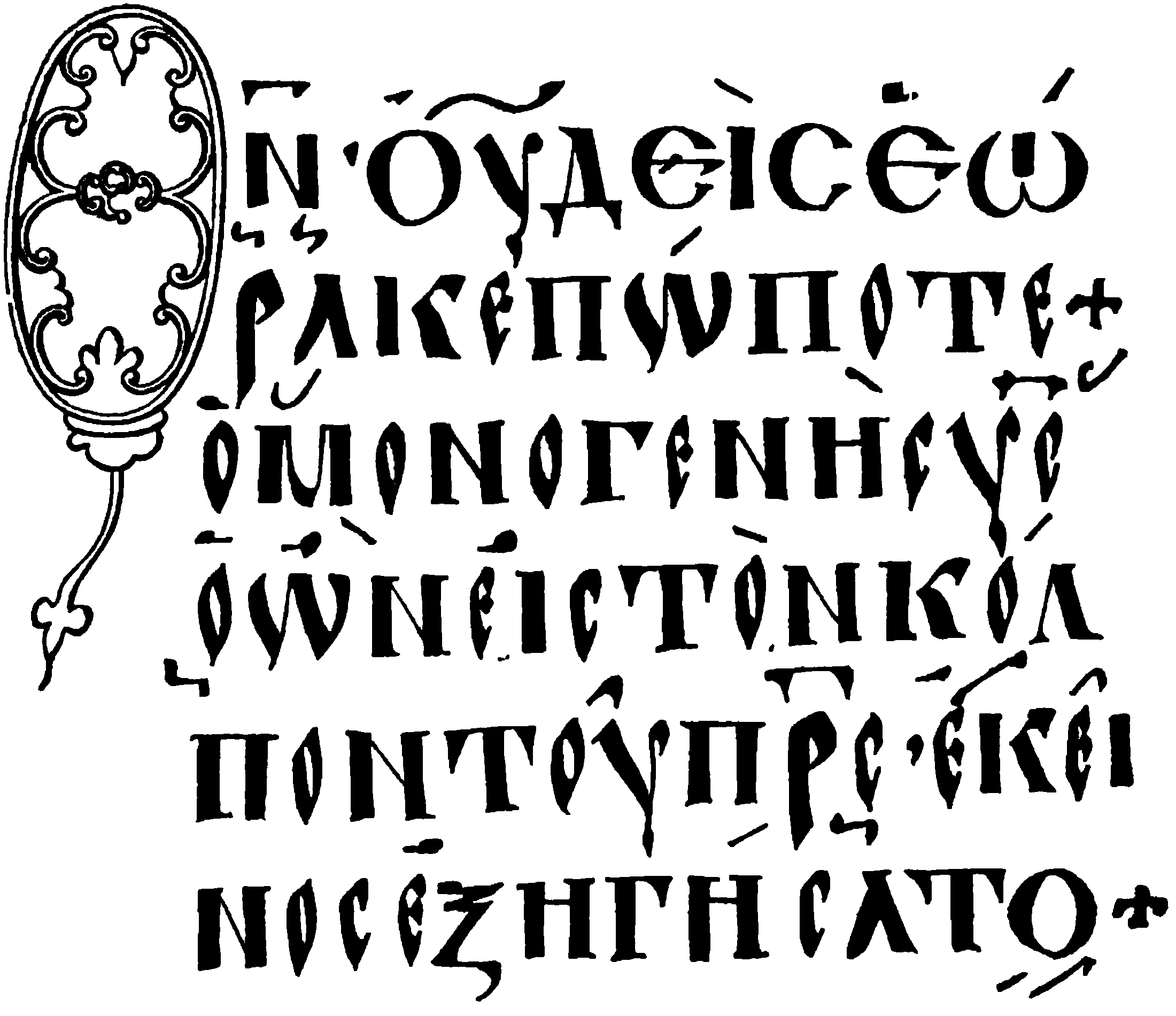
ℓ 150

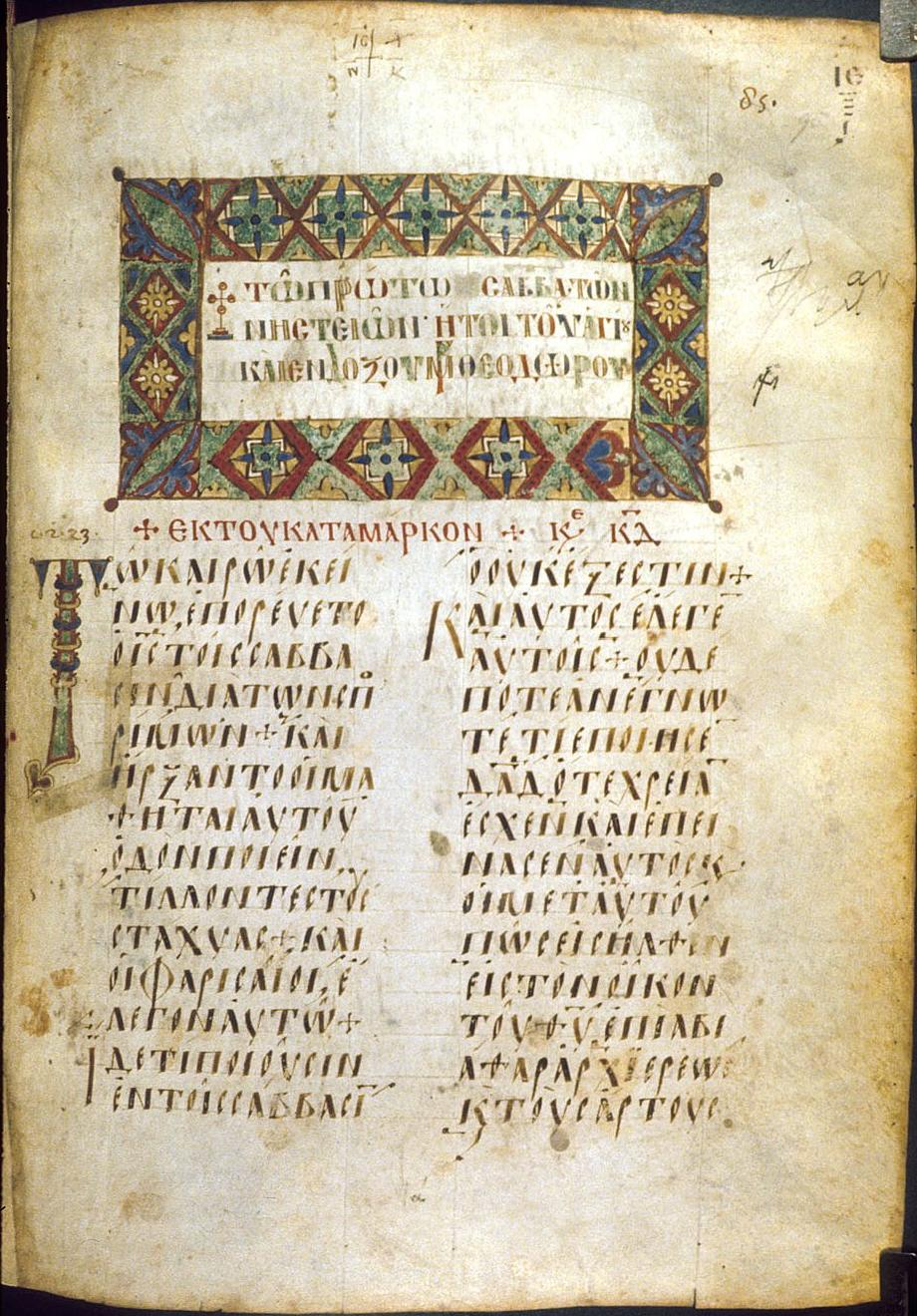
ℓ 152

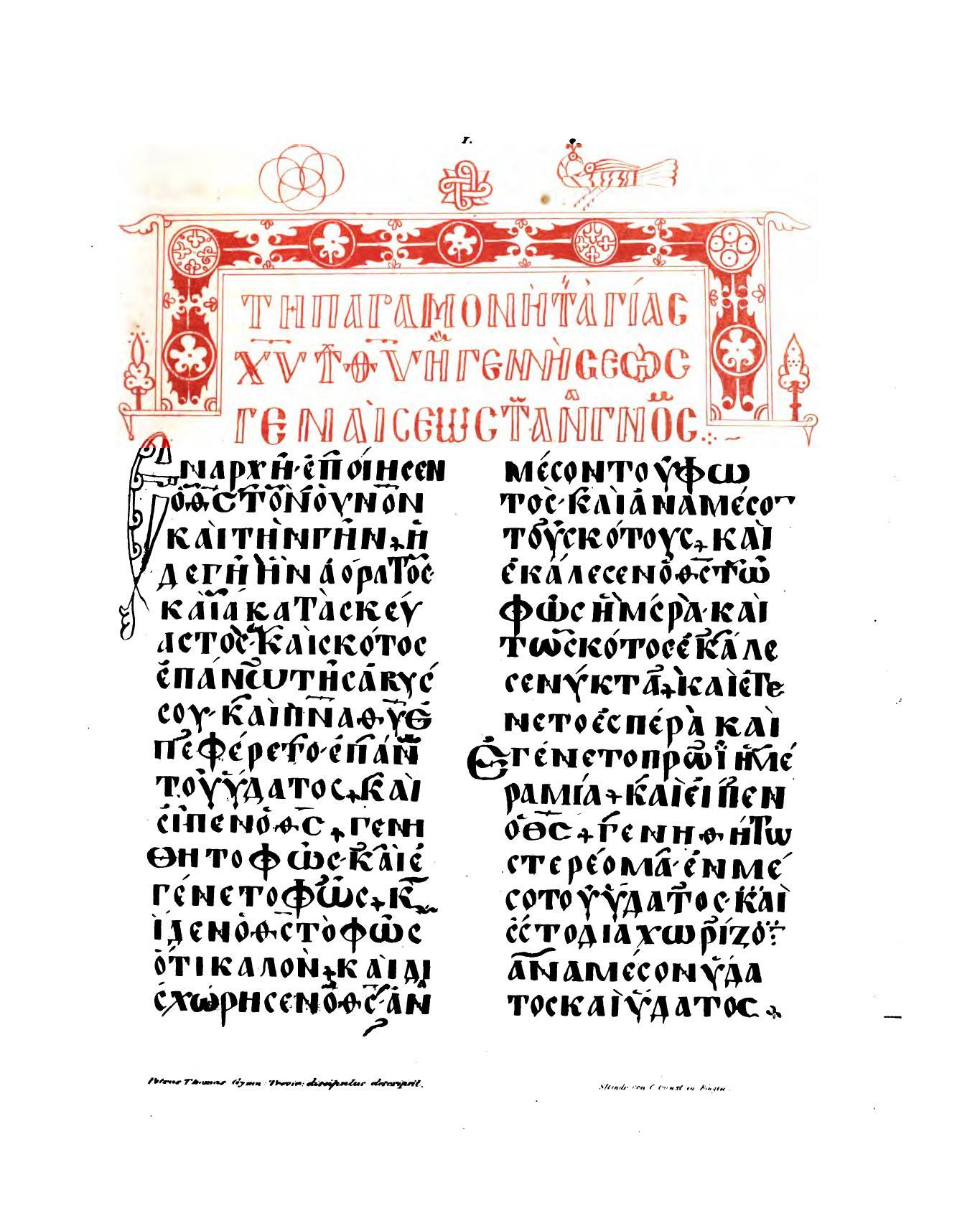
ℓ 179 Old Testament, Genesis

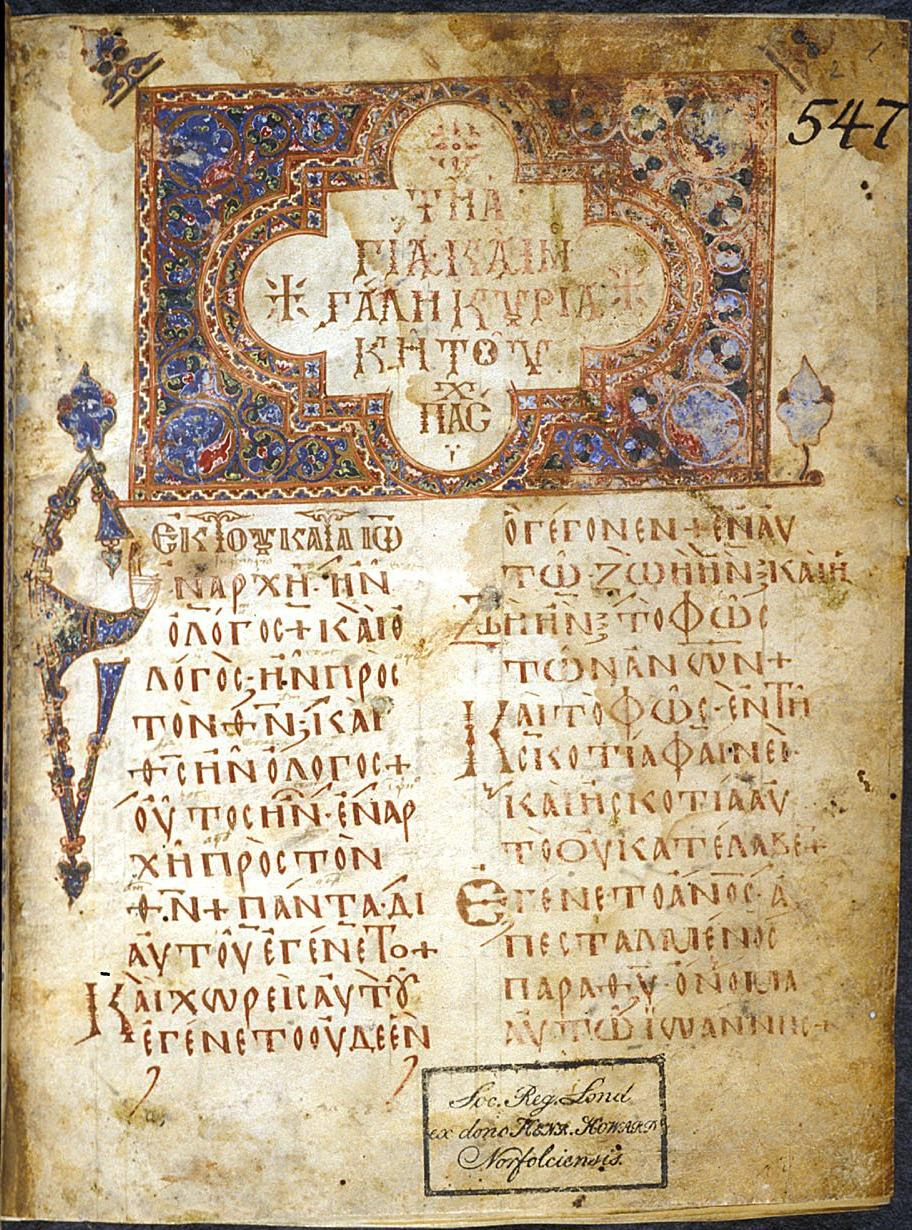
ℓ 183 folio 2

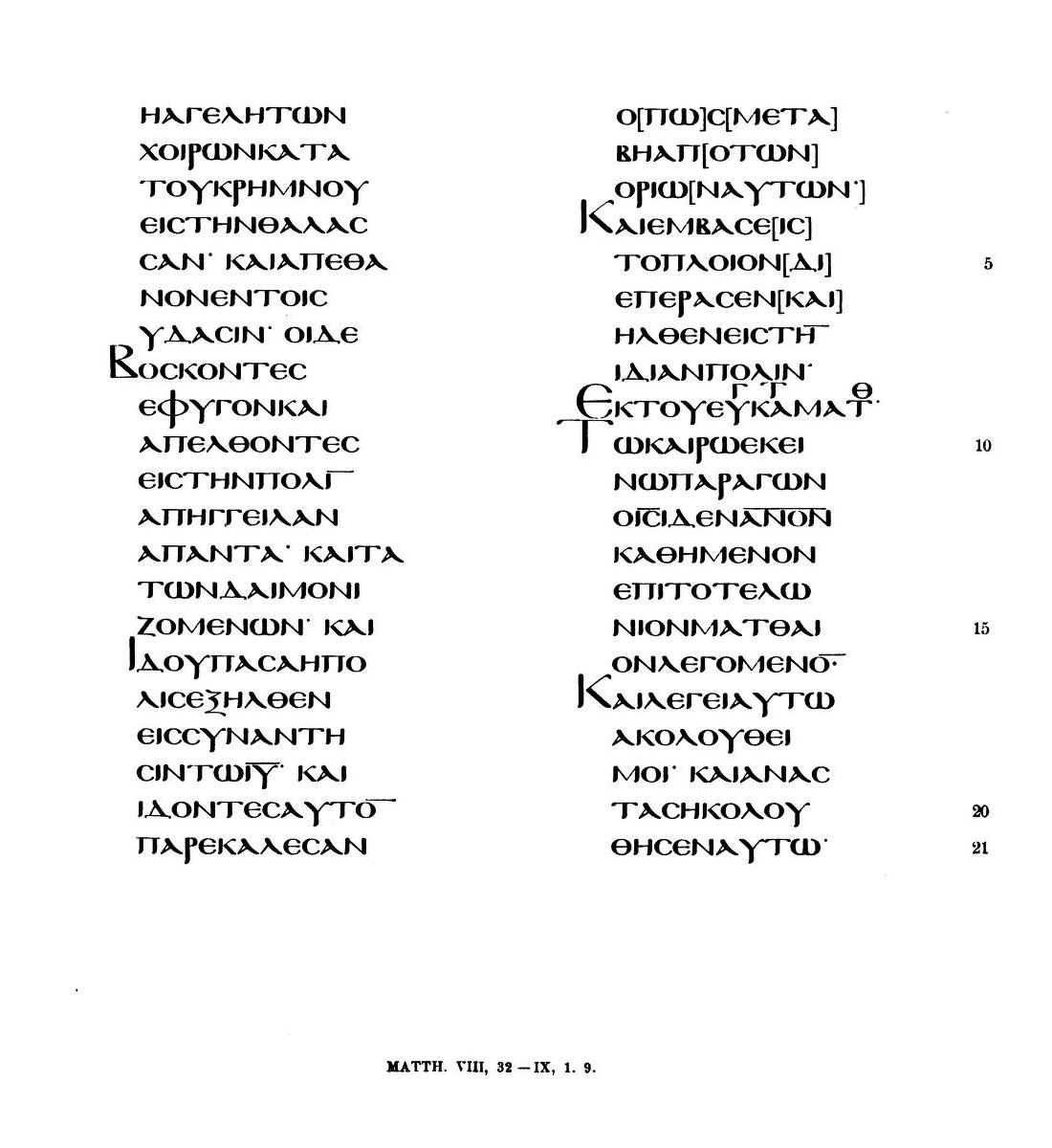
ℓ 269

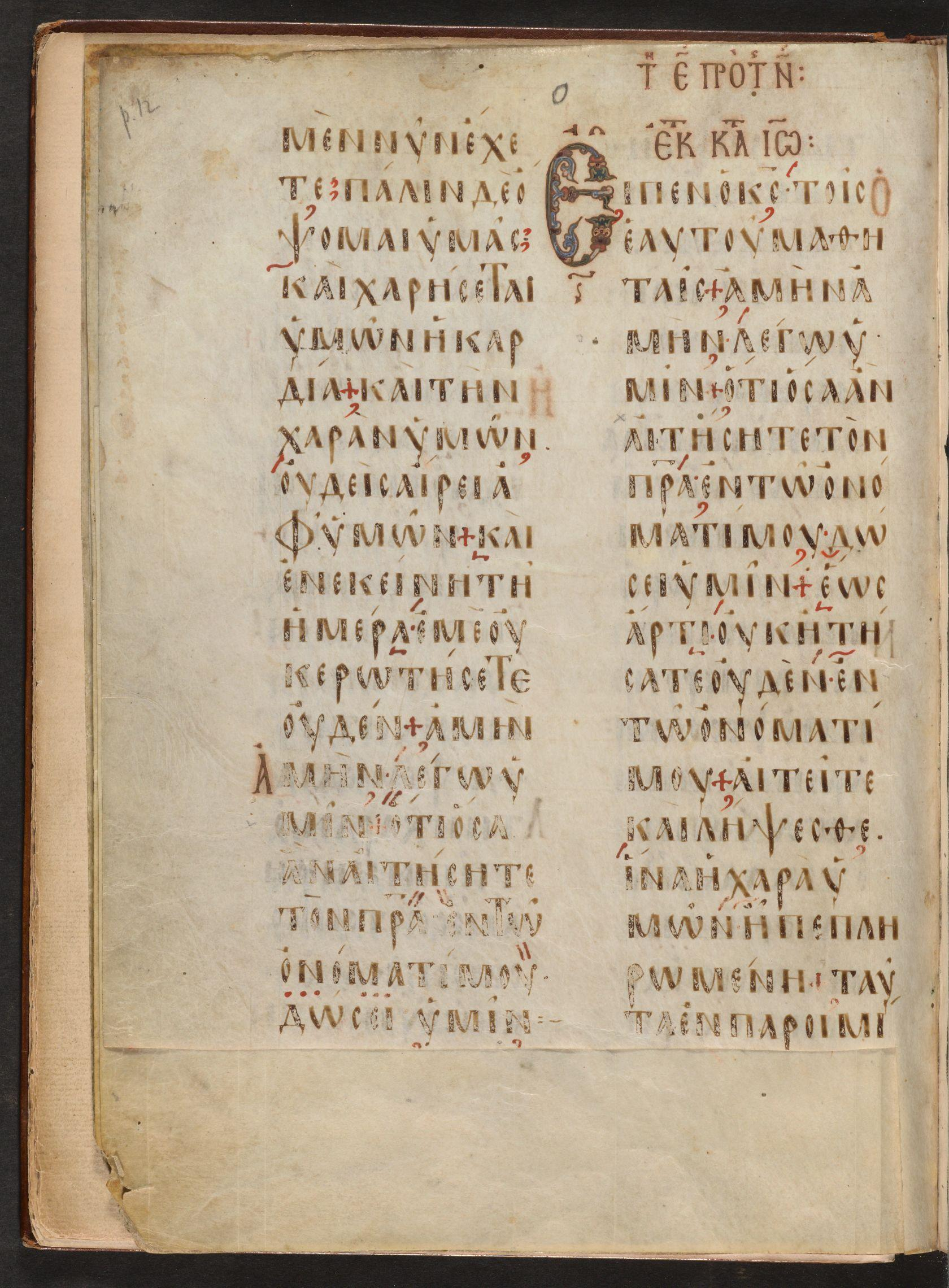
ℓ 296 folio 6 verso

=== Early Cyrillic manuscripts ===
Pictures of Old Church Slavonic weekly gospels (aprakos)

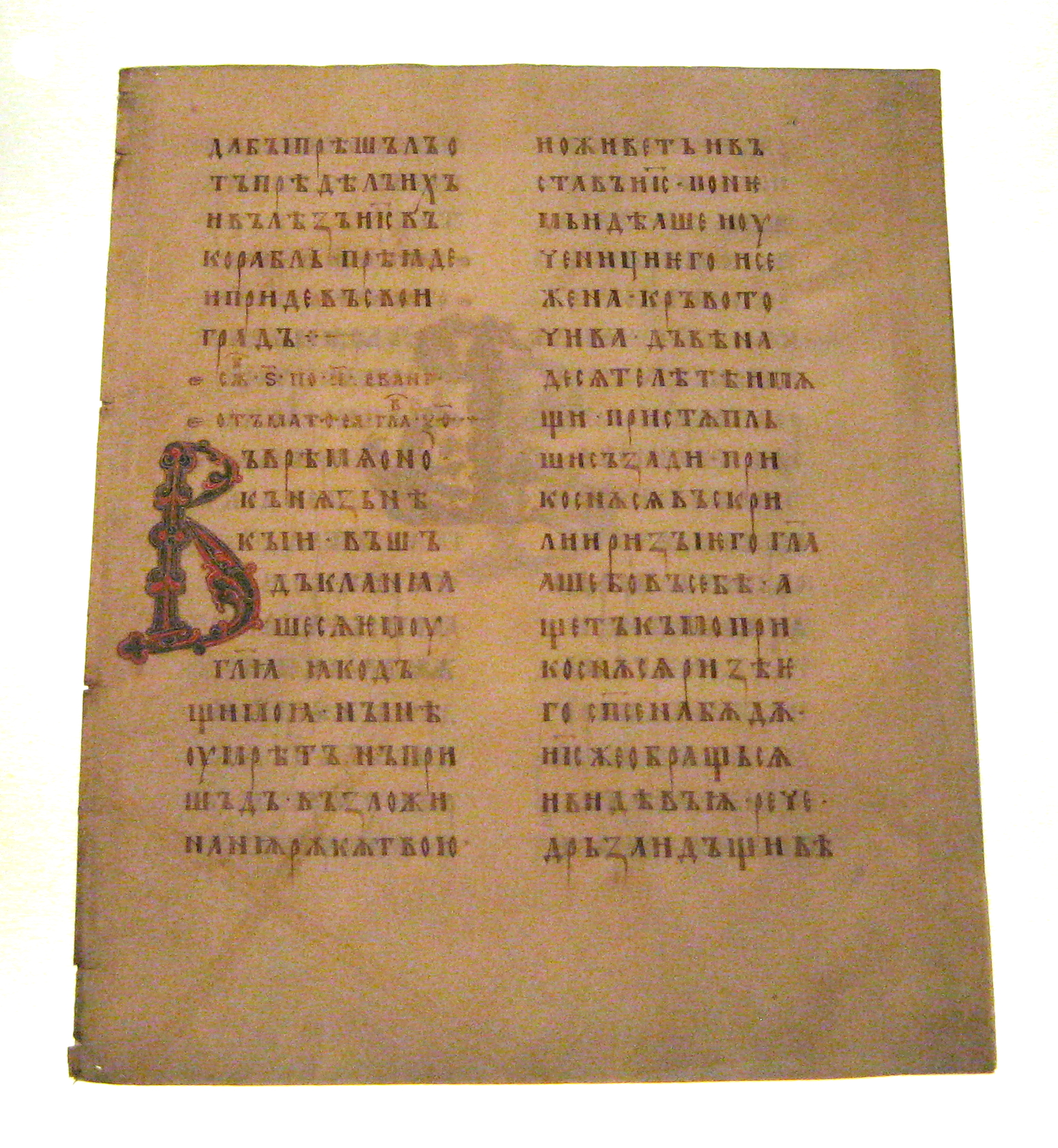
Ostromir Gospels

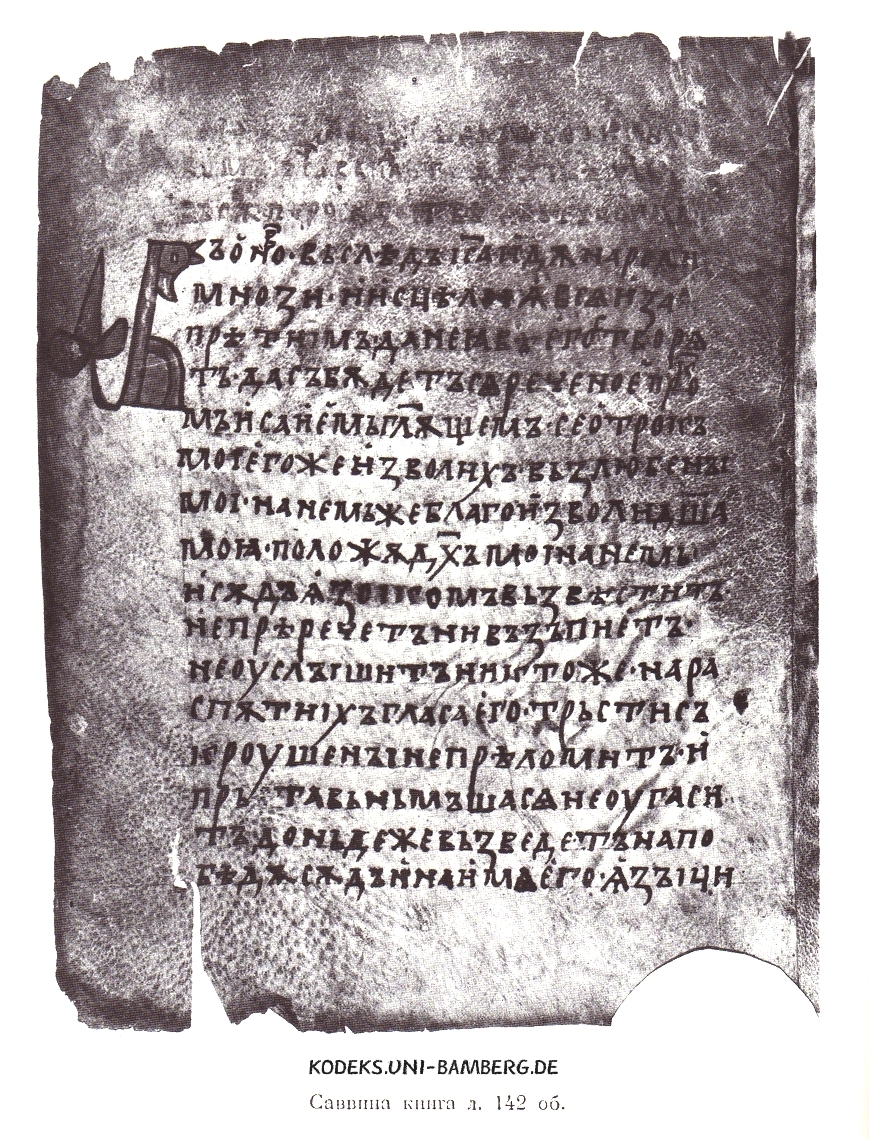
Sava's book

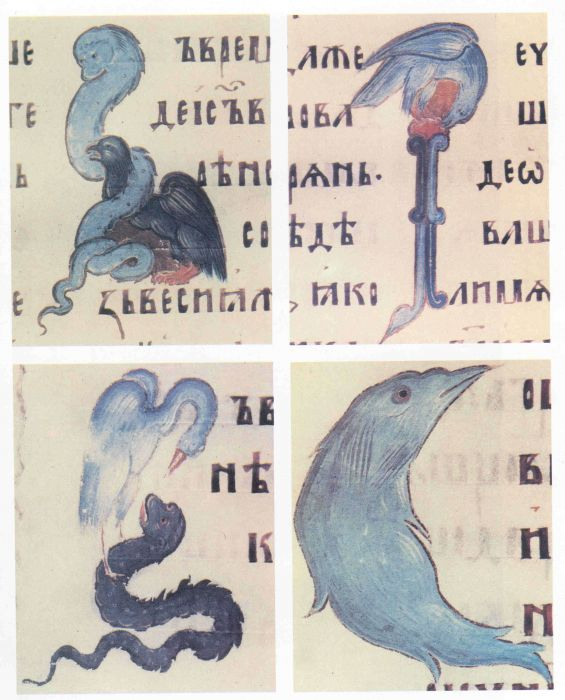
Khitrovo Gospels

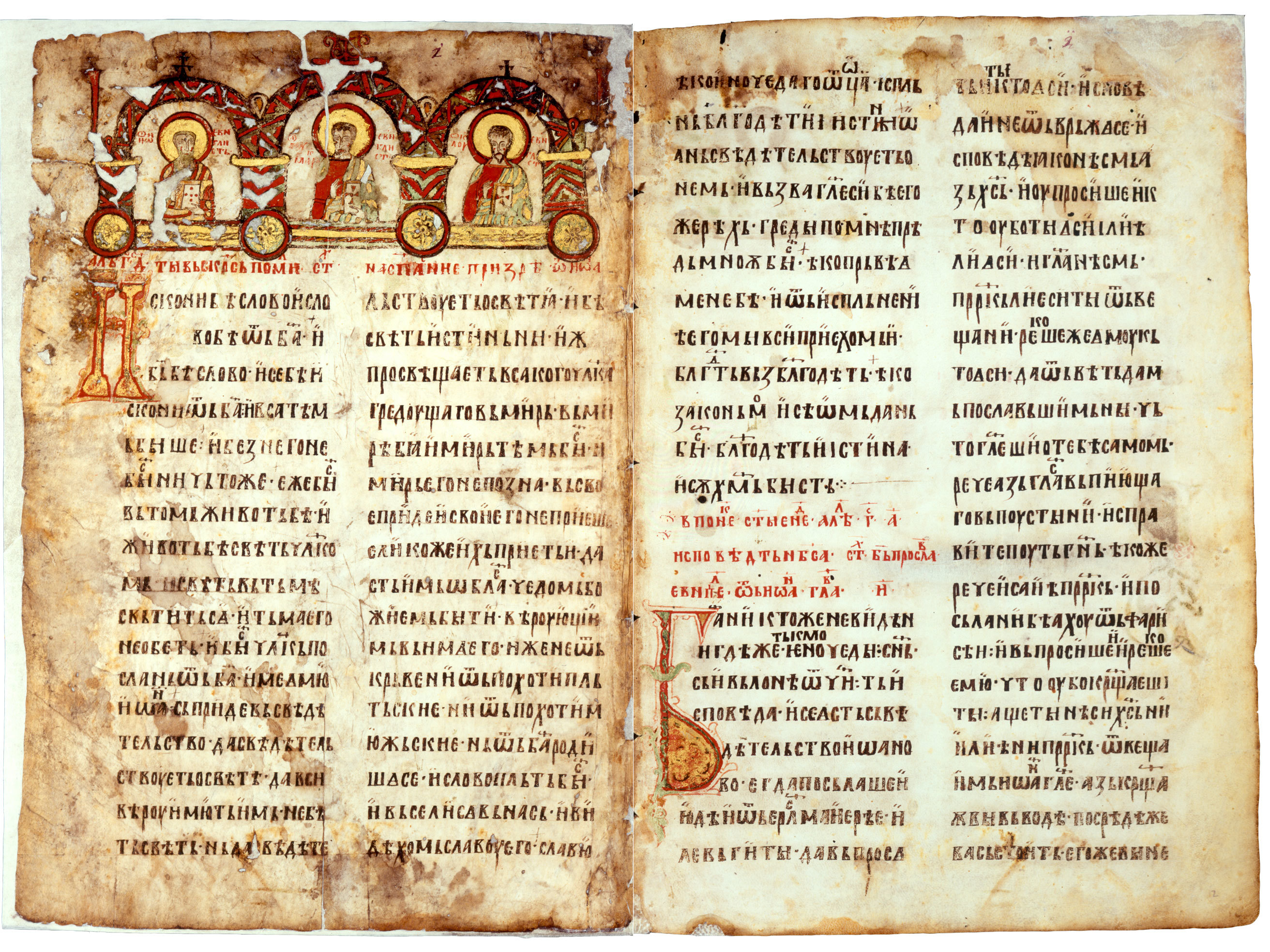
Miroslav Gospel

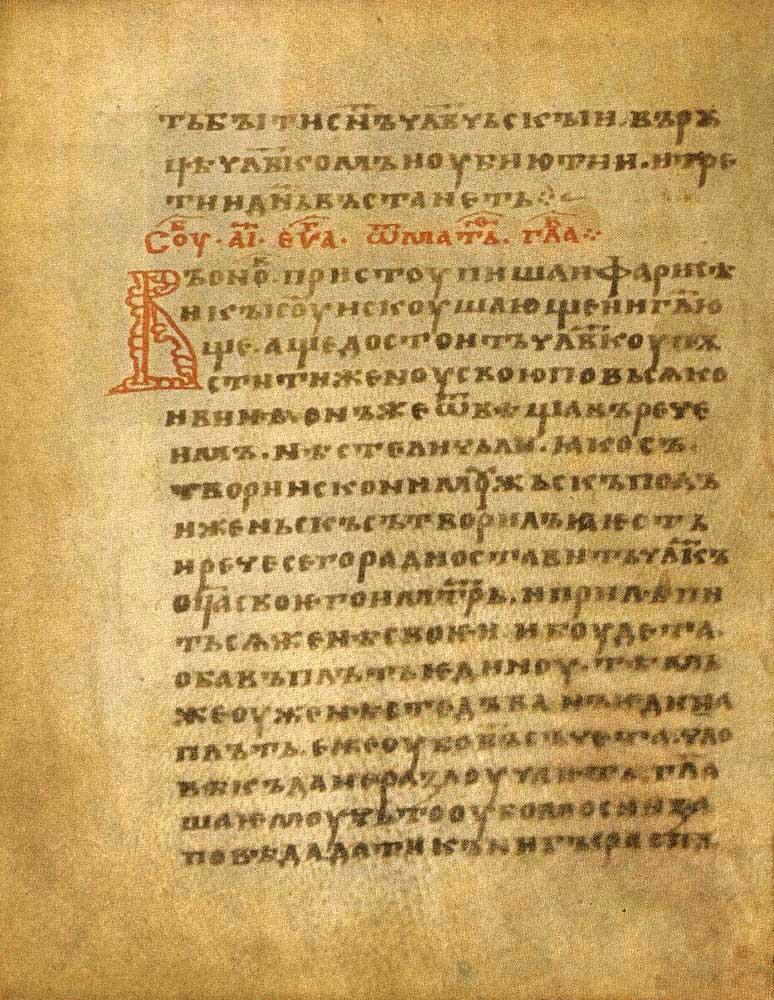
Arkhangelsk Gospel

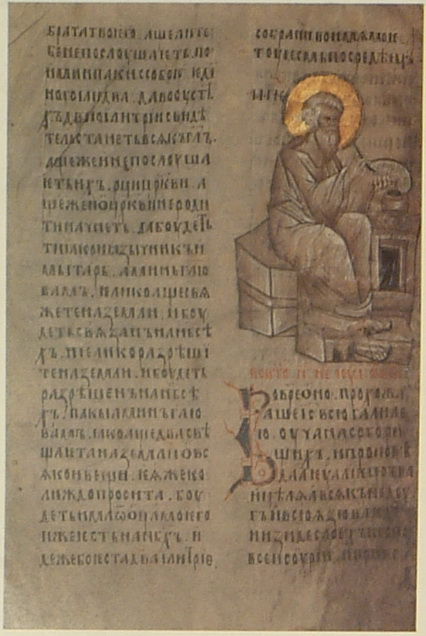

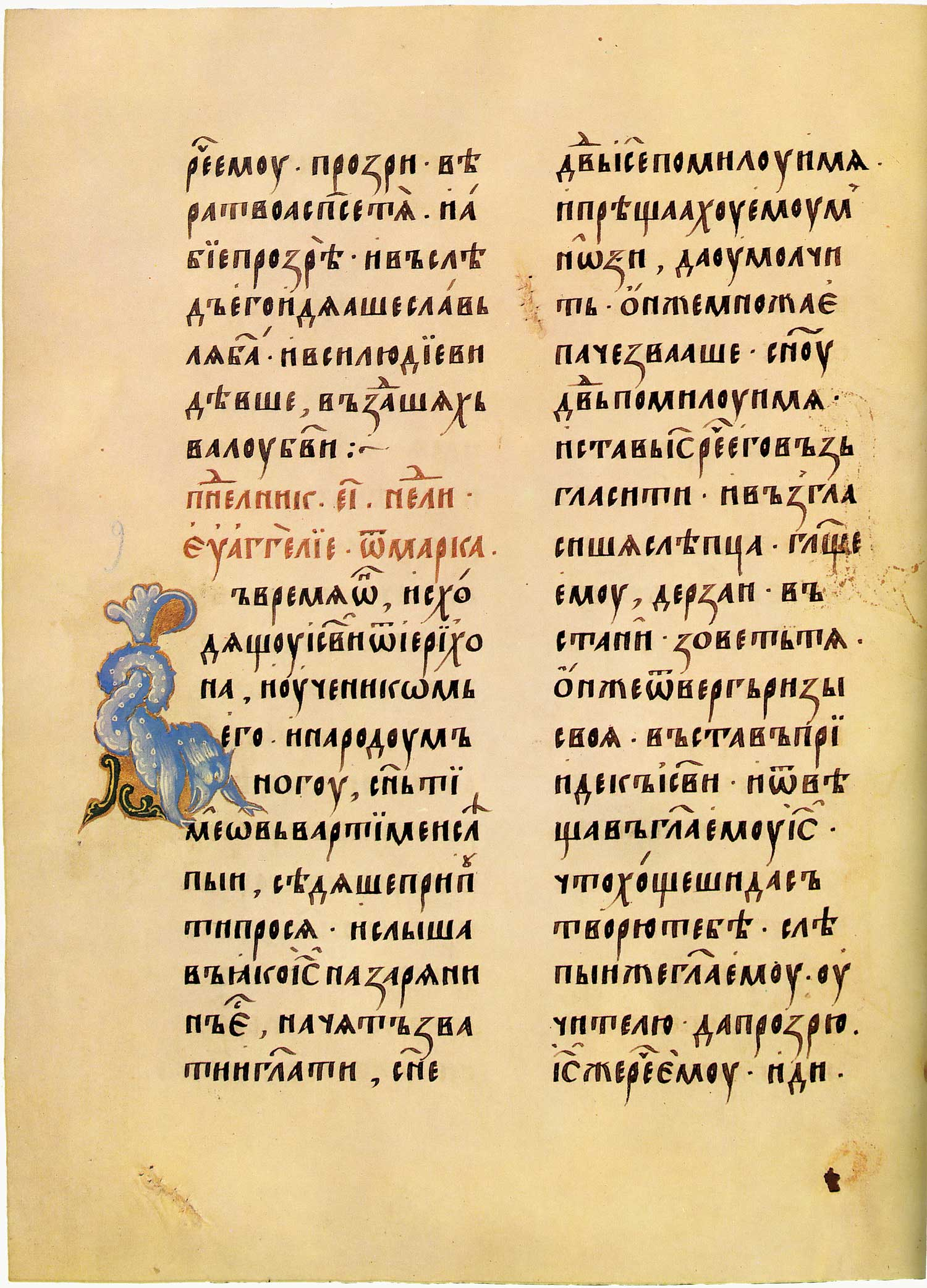
Andronikov Gospels

== See also ==
Media related to Early Cyrillic at Wikimedia Commons

- Relationship of Cyrillic and Glagolitic scripts
- Reforms of Russian orthography
- Nationalism in the Middle Ages#Eastern Orthodox Church, Byzantium, Slavs and Greeks

== Sources ==
- Berdnikov, Alexander and Olga Lapko, "Old Slavonic and Church Slavonic in TEX and Unicode" (PDF). Archived from the original (PDF) on August 5, 2003., EuroTEX '99 Proceedings, September 1999
- Birnbaum, David J., "Unicode for Slavic Medievalists" (PDF). Archived from the original (PDF) on August 3, 2004., September 28, 2002
- Cubberley, Paul (1996) "The Slavic Alphabets". In Daniels and Bright, below.
- Daniels, Peter T., and William Bright, eds. (1996). The World's Writing Systems. Oxford University Press. ISBN 0-19-507993-0.
- Everson, Michael and Ralph Cleminson, ""Final proposal for encoding the Glagolitic script in the UCS", Expert Contribution to the ISO N2610R" (PDF). Archived from the original (PDF) on June 15, 2006., September 4, 2003
- Franklin, Simon. 2002. Writing, Society and Culture in Early Rus, c. 950–1300. Cambridge University Press. ISBN 0-511-03025-8.
- Iliev, I. Short History of the Cyrillic Alphabet. Plovdiv. 2012/Иван Г. Илиев. Кратка история на кирилската азбука. Пловдив. 2012. Short History of the Cyrillic Alphabet
- Lev, V., "The history of the Ukrainian script (paleography)", in Ukraine: a concise encyclopædia, volume 1. University of Toronto Press, 1963, 1970, 1982. ISBN 0-8020-3105-6
- Simovyc, V., and J. B. Rudnyckyj, "The history of Ukrainian orthography", in Ukraine: a concise encyclopædia, volume 1 (op cit).
- Zamora, J., Help me learn Church Slavonic
- Azbuka, Church Slavonic calligraphy and typography.
- Obshtezhitie.net, Cyrillic and Glagolitic manuscripts and early printed books.
