= Koppa (Cyrillic) =

Cyrillic letter

- Ҁ ҁ

Usage
- Writing system: Cyrillic
- Type: Alphabetic

History
- Development: Ϙ ϙ: Ϟ ϟ; Ҁ ҁ

Other
- Associated numbers: 90 (Cyrillic numerals)

Early Cyrillic numeral character Koppa (90)

Koppa (Ҁ ҁ; italics: Ҁ ҁ) is an archaic numeral character of the Cyrillic script. Its form (and modern name) are derived from some forms of the Greek numeral Koppa (Ϟ ϟ), which had originally been a separate letter in Archaic Greek (Ϙ ϙ), but had long since fallen out of use except in its capacity as a numeral.

Koppa was used as a numeral character in the oldest Cyrillic manuscripts, representing the value 90 (exactly as its Greek ancestor did). It was replaced relatively early around 1300 by the Cyrillic letter Che (Ч ч), which is similar in appearance and originally had no numeric value. Isolated examples of Ч used as a numeral are found in the East and South Slavonic areas as early as the eleventh century, though Koppa continued in regular use into the fourteenth century. In some varieties of Western Cyrillic, however, Koppa was retained, and Ч used with the value 60, replacing the Cyrillic letter Ksi (Ѯ ѯ).

Cyrillic Koppa never had a phonetic value and was never used as a letter by any national language using Cyrillic. However, certain modern textbooks and dictionaries of Old Church Slavonic language insert this character among other letters of the early Cyrillic alphabet, either between П and Р (to reproduce the Greek alphabetical order) or at the very end of the list.

== Computing codes ==
Character information
Preview	Ҁ		ҁ	
Unicode name	CYRILLIC CAPITAL LETTER KOPPA		CYRILLIC SMALL LETTER KOPPA	
Encodings	decimal	hex	dec	hex
Unicode	1152	U+0480	1153	U+0481
UTF-8	210 128	D2 80	210 129	D2 81
Numeric character reference	&#1152;	&#x480;	&#1153;	&#x481;

== See also ==
- Q q : Latin letter Q
- Ԛ ԛ : Cyrillic letter qa, used in Kurdish language to transcribe the voiceless uvular plosive (/q/)
- Қ қ : Cyrillic letter ka with descender, used in Turkic languages and Tajik to transcribe the voiceless uvular plosive (/q/)
- Ҡ ҡ : Bashkir Qa, used in the Bashkir language to transcribe the voiceless uvular plosive (/q/)
- Ӄ ӄ : Cyrillic letter ka with hook, used in languages in the Russian Far East to transcribe the voiceless uvular plosive (/q/)
- Ҟ ҟ : Ka with stroke, used in the Abkhaz language to transcribe the uvular ejective (/qʼ/)
