= Cyrillic numerals =

Numeral system derived from the Cyrillic script

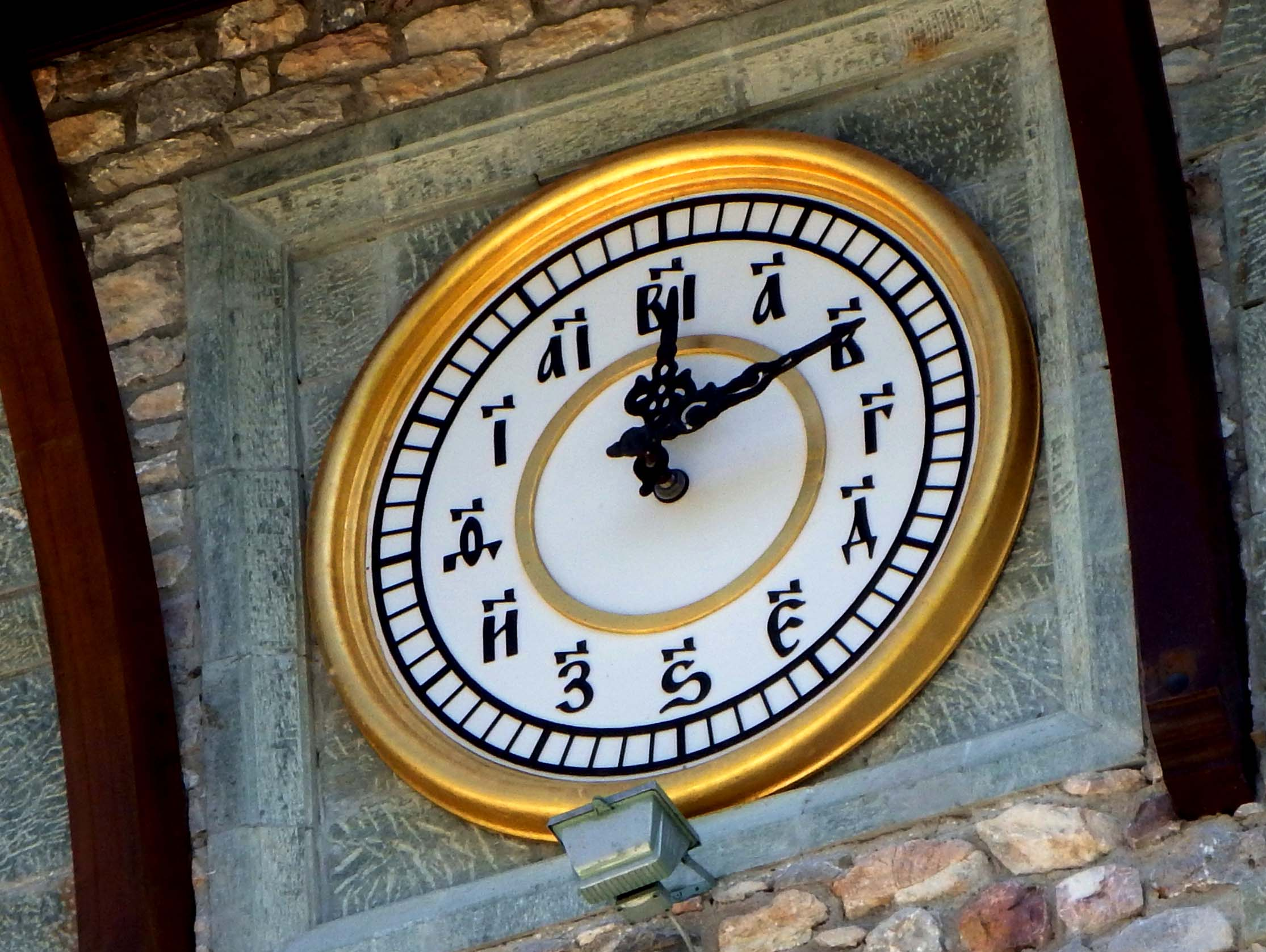
Tower clock with Cyrillic numerals at the Saint Jovan Bigorski Monastery, North Macedonia

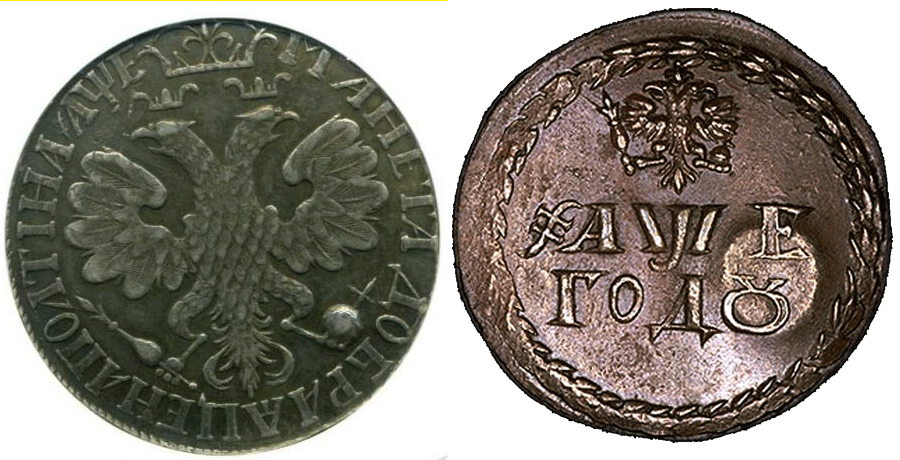
Reverse of silver half ruble (left) and copper beard token featuring the year 1705 in Cyrillic numerals (҂АѰЕ)

Cyrillic numerals are a numeral system derived from the Cyrillic script, developed in the First Bulgarian Empire in the late 10th century. It was used in the First Bulgarian Empire and by South and East Slavic peoples. The system was used in Russia as late as the early 18th century, when Peter the Great replaced it with Hindu-Arabic numerals as part of his civil script reform initiative. Cyrillic numbers played a role in Peter the Great's currency reform plans, too, with silver wire kopecks issued after 1696 and mechanically minted coins issued between 1700 and 1722 inscribed with the date using Cyrillic numerals. By 1725, Russian Imperial coins had transitioned to Arabic numerals. The Cyrillic numerals may still be found in books written in the Church Slavonic language.

== General description ==
The system is a quasi-decimal alphabetic numeral system, equivalent to the Ionian numeral system but written with the corresponding graphemes of the Cyrillic script. The order is based on the original Greek alphabet rather than the standard Cyrillic alphabetical order.

A separate letter is assigned to each unit (1, 2, ... 9), each multiple of ten (10, 20, ... 90), and each multiple of one hundred (100, 200, ... 900). To distinguish numbers from text, a titlo ( ҃) is sometimes drawn over the numbers, or they are set apart with dots. The numbers are written as pronounced in Slavonic, generally from the high value position to the low value position, with the exception of 11 through 19, which are written and pronounced with the ones unit before the tens; for example, ЗІ (17) is "семнадсять" (literally seven-on-ten, cf. the English seven-teen).

Examples:

- (҂аѱ҃ѕ) – 1706
- (҂зр︮и︯і) – 7118
- A long titlo may be used for long runs of numbers: ҂з︮р︦н︦і︯.

To evaluate a Cyrillic number, the values of all the figures are added up: for example, ѰЗ is 700 + 7, making 707. If the number is greater than 999 (ЦЧѲ), the thousands sign (҂) is used to multiply the number's value: for example, ҂Ѕ is 6000, while ҂Л҂В is parsed as 30,000 + 2000, making 32,000. To produce larger numbers, a modifying sign is used to encircle the number being multiplied. Two scales existed in such cases (similar to the long and short scales): one is 'Малый счёт' or Lesser Count, giving a new name and sign every order of magnitude, and the other is 'Великий счёт' or Greater Count, where every name and sign is the previous one squared, up until 10^{48}- instead of going to 10^{96}, it goes to 10^{49}.

Modifying signs used to denote values 1000 and greater. For example, А҉ denotes 1 million.

== Table of values ==
Value	Greek	Cyrillic	Value	Greek	Cyrillic	Value	Greek	Cyrillic
1	Αʹ	А	10	Ιʹ	І	100	Ρʹ	Р
2	Βʹ	В	20	Κʹ	К	200	Σʹ	С
3	Γʹ	Г	30	Λʹ	Л	300	Τʹ	Т
4	Δʹ	Д	40	Μʹ	М	400	Υʹ	У or Ѵ or Ꙋ
5	Εʹ	Е	50	Νʹ	Н	500	Φʹ	Ф
6	Ϛʹ or Ϝʹ	Ѕ	60	Ξʹ	Ѯ or Ч^{†}	600	Χʹ	Х
7	Ζʹ	З	70	Οʹ	О	700	Ψʹ	Ѱ
8	Ηʹ	И	80	Πʹ	П	800	Ωʹ	Ѡ or Ѿ or Ꙍ
9	Θʹ	Ѳ	90	Ϟʹ or Ϙʹ	Ч or Ҁ^{†}	900	Ϡʹ or Ͳʹ	Ц or Ѧ

^† In some varieties of Western Cyrillic, Ч was used for 60 and Ҁ was used for 90.

Cyrillic modifying signs
Name (English)	Lesser count multiplier	Greater count multiplier	Sign
Тысѫщи (Thousand)	1,000	1,000	҂
Тьма (Myriad)	10,000	1,000,000	⃝
Лєгєонъ (Legion)	100,000	10^{12}	҈
Лєѡдръ (Legion of Legions)	1,000,000	10^{24}	҉
Вранъ (Raven/Crow)	10,000,000	10^{48}	꙰
Клада (Trough/Log)	100,000,000	10^{49}	꙱
Тьма тьмъ (Many Myriad)	1,000,000,000	10^{50}	꙲

== Computing codes ==
character	◌҃		◌︮		◌︦		◌︯		҂	
Unicode name	COMBINING CYRILLIC; TITLO	COMBINING CYRILLIC; TITLO	COMBINING CYRILLIC TITLO LEFT HALF	COMBINING CYRILLIC TITLO LEFT HALF	COMBINING CONJOINING MACRON	COMBINING CONJOINING MACRON	COMBINING CYRILLIC TITLO RIGHT HALF	COMBINING CYRILLIC TITLO RIGHT HALF	CYRILLIC; THOUSANDS SIGN	CYRILLIC; THOUSANDS SIGN
character encoding	decimal	hex	decimal	hex	decimal	hex	decimal	hex	decimal	hex
Unicode	1155	0483	65070	FE2E	65062	FE26	65071	FE2F	1154	0482
UTF-8	210 131	D2 83	239 184 174	EF B8 AE	239 184 166	EF B8 A6	239 184 175	EF B8 AF	210 130	D2 82
Numeric character reference	&#1155;	&#x0483;	&#65070;	&#xFE2E;	&#65062;	&#xFE26;	&#65071;	&#xFE2F;	&#1154;	&#x0482;

character	⃝		҈		҉		꙰		꙱		꙲	
Unicode name	COMBINING; ENCLOSING CIRCLE (Cyrillic combining ten thousands sign)		COMBINING; CYRILLIC HUNDRED; THOUSANDS SIGN	COMBINING; CYRILLIC HUNDRED; THOUSANDS SIGN	COMBINING; CYRILLIC; MILLIONS SIGN	COMBINING; CYRILLIC; MILLIONS SIGN	COMBINING; CYRILLIC TEN; MILLIONS SIGN	COMBINING; CYRILLIC TEN; MILLIONS SIGN	COMBINING; CYRILLIC HUNDRED; MILLIONS SIGN	COMBINING; CYRILLIC HUNDRED; MILLIONS SIGN	COMBINING; CYRILLIC BILLIONS SIGN	COMBINING; CYRILLIC BILLIONS SIGN
character encoding	decimal	hex	decimal	hex	decimal	hex	decimal	hex	decimal	hex	decimal	hex
Unicode	8413	20DD	1160	0488	1161	0489	42608	A670	42609	A671	42610	A672
UTF-8	226 131 157	E2 83 9D	210 136	D2 88	210 137	D2 89	234 153 176	EA 99 B0	234 153 177	EA 99 B1	234 153 178	EA 99 B2
Numeric character reference	&#8413;	&#x20DD;	&#1160;	&#x0488;	&#1161;	&#x0489;	&#42608;	&#xA670;	&#42609;	&#xA671;	&#42610;	&#xA672;

== See also ==
- Early Cyrillic alphabet
- Glagolitic alphabet
- Glagolitic numerals
- Greek numerals
- Relationship of Cyrillic and Glagolitic scripts
