= Xi (letter) =

Fourteenth letter in the Greek alphabet

Xi (/zaɪ/ ZY or /(k)saɪ/ (K)SY; uppercase Ξ, lowercase ξ; Greek: ξι) is the fourteenth letter of the Greek alphabet, representing the voiceless consonant cluster [ks]. Its name is pronounced [ksi] in both Ancient Greek and Modern Greek. In the system of Greek numerals, it has a value of 60. Xi was derived from the Phoenician letter samekh (𐤎).

Xi is distinct from the letter chi, which gave its form to the Latin letter X.

== Greek ==
Both in classical Ancient Greek and in Modern Greek, the letter Ξ represents the consonant cluster /ks/. In some archaic local variants of the Greek alphabet, this letter was missing. Instead, especially in the dialects of most of the Greek mainland and Euboea, the cluster /ks/ was represented by Χ (which in classical Greek is chi, used for /kʰ/).

A joined variant of Ξ (New Athena Unicode font)

Because this variant of the Greek alphabet was used in Magna Graecia (the Greek colonies in Sicily and the southern part of the Italian Peninsula), the Latin alphabet borrowed Χ rather than Ξ as the Latin letter that represented the /ks/ cluster that was also present in Latin.

== Cyrillic ==
Xi was adopted into the early Cyrillic alphabet as the letter ksi (Ѯ ѯ). It was ultimately removed from the Russian alphabet in 1735.

== Mathematics and science ==
=== Uppercase ===
The uppercase letter Ξ is used as a symbol in various contexts.

==== Pure mathematics ====
- Harish-Chandra's Ξ function in harmonic analysis and representation theory
- The Riemann Xi function in analytic number theory and complex analysis

==== Physics ====
- The "cascade particles" in particle physics
- The partition function under the grand canonical ensemble in statistical mechanics

==== Other uses ====
- Indicating "no change of state" in Z notation in computing
- Used as the Latin letter E in some logos.
- Monetary units of the cryptocurrencies Ether (and less commonly ETC), equal to 10^{18} Wei

=== Lowercase ===
The lowercase letter ξ is used as a symbol for:

==== Pure mathematics ====
- Random variables
- A parameter in a generalized Pareto distribution
- The symmetric function equation of the Riemann zeta function in mathematics, also known as the Riemann xi function
- A universal set in set theory
- A number used in the remainder term of Taylor's theorem that falls between the limits a and b
- A number used in error approximations for formulas that are applications of Taylor's theorem, such as Newton–Cotes formulas

==== Physics and astronomy ====
- In fluid dynamics, the Iribarren parameter.
- The initial mass function in astronomy.
- The correlation function in astronomy.
- Spatial frequency; also sometimes temporal frequency.
- A small displacement in MHD plasma stability theory
- The x-coordinate of computational space as used in computational fluid dynamics
- Potential difference in physics (in volts)
- The radial integral in the spin-orbit matrix operator in atomic physics.
- The Killing vector in general relativity.
- Average logarithmic energy decrement per collision (neutron calculations in nuclear physics)
- Pippard's cohesion length in superconductors
- The diameter of a crystal nucleus in nucleation theory
- Microturbulence velocity in a stellar atmosphere
- The dimensionless longitudinal momentum loss of a beam particle after a two-body interaction in accelerator physics.
- Dimensionless distance variable used in the Lane–Emden equation

==== Other uses ====
- Propositional variables in some philosophical works, first found in Wittgenstein's Tractatus
- Extent of reaction, a concept in physical chemistry used often in chemical engineering kinetics and thermochemistry
- Unknown stereochemistry or stereocentre configuration in a planar ring system in organic chemistry, as well as uppercase Xi for unknown R/S/E/Z configuration in general
- One of the two different polypeptide chains of the human embryonic hemoglobin types Hb-Portland (ξ_{2}γ_{2}) and Hb-Gower I (ξ_{2}ε_{2})
- A parameter denoted as warped time used to derive the equations for homogeneous azeotropic distillation
- State Price Density in mathematical finance
- The information vector in the Information Filter, GraphSLAM, and a number of other algorithms used for robot localization and robotic mapping.
- Used in Support Vector machines in cases where the data is not linearly separable.
- Used in Microelectronics to represent the distance from a p-n junction to a point in the depletion region where the electric field is strongest.

== Other uses ==
Ξ for E in a commercial logo

Uppercase Ξ is used as an 'E' to stylise company names/logos like Razer (styled as RΛZΞR), Tesla (styled as TΞSLA), the presidential campaigns of Joe Biden (styled as BIDΞN), musician Banners (styled as BANNΞRS), and in South Korean boy group ZE:A's newest logo (styled as ZΞA) making a faux greek (Compare: Heavy Metal umlaut; Faux Cyrillic)

== Unicode ==
Unicode Code Charts: Greek and Coptic (Range: 0370-03FF)

- U+039E Ξ GREEK CAPITAL LETTER XI (&Xi;) (\Xi in TeX)
- U+03BE ξ GREEK SMALL LETTER XI (&xi;) (\xi in TeX)
- U+046E Ѯ CYRILLIC CAPITAL LETTER KSI
- U+046F ѯ CYRILLIC SMALL LETTER KSI
- U+2C9C Ⲝ COPTIC CAPITAL LETTER KSI
- U+2C9D ⲝ COPTIC SMALL LETTER KSI
- U+1D6B5 𝚵 MATHEMATICAL BOLD CAPITAL XI (Note: The mathematical symbols should only be used for math. Stylized Greek text should be encoded using the normal Greek letters, with markup and formatting to indicate text style.)
- U+1D6CF 𝛏 MATHEMATICAL BOLD SMALL XI
- U+1D6EF 𝛯 MATHEMATICAL ITALIC CAPITAL XI
- U+1D709 𝜉 MATHEMATICAL ITALIC SMALL XI
- U+1D729 𝜩 MATHEMATICAL BOLD ITALIC CAPITAL XI
- U+1D743 𝝃 MATHEMATICAL BOLD ITALIC SMALL XI
- U+1D763 𝝣 MATHEMATICAL SANS-SERIF BOLD CAPITAL XI
- U+1D77D 𝝽 MATHEMATICAL SANS-SERIF BOLD SMALL XI
- U+1D79D 𝞝 MATHEMATICAL SANS-SERIF BOLD ITALIC CAPITAL XI
- U+1D7B7 𝞷 MATHEMATICAL SANS-SERIF BOLD ITALIC SMALL XI
