= Samekh =

Fifteenth letter of many Semitic abjads

← Nun Samekh Ayin →
- Phoenician: 𐤎
- Hebrew: ס
- Samaritan: ࠎ
- Aramaic: 𐡎
- Syriac: ܣ
- Nabataean: 𐢖
- South Arabian: 𐩯
- North Arabian: 𐪏
- Ugaritic: 𐎒
- Phonemic representation: s
- Position in alphabet: 15
- Numerical value: 60

Alphabetic derivatives of the Phoenician
- Greek: Ξ
- Cyrillic: Ѯ

Samekh or samech is the fifteenth letter of the Semitic abjads, including Phoenician sāmk 𐤎, Hebrew sāmeḵ ס, Aramaic samek 𐡎, and Syriac semkaṯ ܣ. Samekh is the only letter of the Semitic abjad that has no surviving descendant in the Arabic alphabet; however, it was present in the Nabataean alphabet, the Arabic alphabet's immediate predecessor, as the letter simkath 𐢖, which was related to the Ancient North Arabian 𐪏 and South Arabian 𐩯. The numerical value of samekh is 60.

Samekh represents a voiceless alveolar fricative /s/. In the Hebrew language, the samekh ס has the same pronunciation as the left-dotted shin שׂ.

In Arabic, samekh is replaced by the letter sīn (س, /s/) which is the 15th letter in the common Abjadi order, and the 12th letter in the Hija'i order, it has the same numerical (abjad) value of 60 in the common Abjadi order.

== Origin ==
The Phoenician letter may continue a glyph from the Middle Bronze Age alphabets, possibly based on a hieroglyph for a tent peg or support, such as the djed "pillar" hieroglyph 𓊽 (cf. Hebrew root סמך s-m-kh 'support', סֶמֶךְ semekh 'support, rest', סוֹמֵךְ somekh 'support peg, post', סוֹמְכָה somkha 'armrest', סָמוֹכָה smokha 'stake, support', indirectly s'mikhah סמיכה; Aramaic סַמְכָא samkha 'socket, base', סְמַךְ smakh 'support, help'; Syriac ܣܡܟܐ semkha 'support', Arabic سَمَكَ 'to raise, to elevate').

The shape of samek undergoes complicated developments. In archaic scripts, the vertical stroke can be drawn either across or below the three horizontal strokes. The closed form of Hebrew samek is developed only in the Hasmonean period.

Phoenician/Paleo-Hebrew (c. 1000 BC)	Imperial Aramaic (c. 800 BC)	Greek Xi (letter)(750 BC)	Hebrew (from ca. 350 BC)

The Phoenician letter gave rise to the Greek xi (Ξ), whereas its name may also be reflected in the name of the otherwise unrelated Greek letter sigma.

The archaic "grid" shape of Western Greek xi was adopted in the early Etruscan alphabet (𐌎 esh), but was never included in the Latin alphabet. The letter samekh is currently the only letter of the Semitic abjad that has no surviving descendant in the Arabic alphabet, and the letter س corresponds exclusively to ש rather than ס, despite its resemblance to Greek minuscule Xi (ξ), Cyrillic Ksi (Ѯ) and to the Syriac Semkaṯ (ܣ).

The history of the letters expressing sibilants in the various Semitic alphabets is somewhat complicated, due to different mergers between Proto-Semitic phonemes. As usually reconstructed, there are four plain Proto-Semitic coronal voiceless fricative phonemes (not counting emphatic ones) that evolved into the various voiceless sibilants of its daughter languages, as follows:

Voiceless consonants
Proto-Semitic		Old South Arabian	Old North Arabian	Modern South Arabian ^{1, 2}	Standard Arabic		Aramaic		Modern Hebrew		Ge'ez		Phoenician		Akkadian
s₃ (s)	[s] / [ts]	𐩯	𐪏	/s/	س	/s/	ס	s	ס	/s/	ሰ	s	𐤎	s	s
s₁ (š)	[ʃ] / [s]	𐩪	𐪊	/ʃ/, sometimes /h/	س	/s/	ש	š	שׁ	/ʃ/	ሰ	s	𐤔	š	š
ṯ	[θ]	𐩻	𐪛	/θ/	ث	/θ/	ש, later ת	*ṯ, š, later t	שׁ	/ʃ/	ሰ	s	𐤔	š	š
s₂ (ś)	[ɬ]	𐩦	𐪆	/ɬ/	ش	/ʃ/	ש, later ס	*ś, s	שׂ	/s/	ሠ	ś	𐤔	š	š
1. s₁ (š) is [ʃ], sometimes [h] and [j^{ɦ}] (in Soqotri) - [ʃ] and [ɕ^{w}] (for some speakers of Jibbali); 2. ṯ [θ], ḏ [ð] and ṯ̣ [θʼ] merge with [t], [d], and [tʼ] in Soqotri

Note: Hebrew ש represents both /s/ and /ʃ/, when distinguishing is required, they can be distinguished a dot above the left-hand side of the letter for /s/ שׂ and above the right-hand side for /ʃ/ שׁ.

== Hebrew samech ==
The Hebrew letter Samech (Hebrew: סָמֶךְ, romanized: sāmeḵ) represents the phoneme /s/, which is realised as the consonant [s] in all pronunciations of Hebrew, like s in the English word soft. The shape of the letter developed as a closed cursive form in the middle Hasmonean period (1st century BC). This became standard in early Herodian period.

Orthographic variants
Various print fonts			Cursive Hebrew	Solitreo	Rashi script
Serif	Sans-serif	Monospaced	Cursive Hebrew	Solitreo	Rashi script
ס	ס	ס			

=== Talmudic legend ===
In Talmudic legend, samekh is said to have been a miracle of the Ten Commandments. Exodus 32:15 records that the tablets "were written on both their sides." The Jerusalem Talmud interprets this as meaning that the inscription went through the full thickness of the tablets. The stone in the center parts of the letters ayin and teth should have fallen out, as these letters are closed in the ktav ivri script and would not be connected to the rest of the tablet, but miraculously remained in place. The Babylonian Talmud (tractate Shabbat 104a) also cites the opinion that these closed letters included samekh, attributed to Rav Chisda (d. ca. 320).

== Syriac semkat ==
The Syriac letter semkaṯ ܣܡܟܬ develops from the Imperial Aramaic "hook" shape 𐡎 into a rounded form by the 1st century. The Old Syriac form further develops into a connected cursive both in the Eastern and Western script variants.

Aramaic	Old Syriac	Eastern	Western

Position in word:	Isolated	Final	Medial	Initial
Glyph form: (Help)	ܣ	ـܣ	ـܣـ	ܣـ

== Character encodings ==
Character information
Preview	ס		ܣ		ܤ		ࠎ	
Unicode name	HEBREW LETTER SAMEKH		SYRIAC LETTER SEMKATH		SYRIAC LETTER FINAL SEMKATH		SAMARITAN LETTER SINGAAT	
Encodings	decimal	hex	dec	hex	dec	hex	dec	hex
Unicode	1505	U+05E1	1827	U+0723	1828	U+0724	2062	U+080E
UTF-8	215 161	D7 A1	220 163	DC A3	220 164	DC A4	224 160 142	E0 A0 8E
Numeric character reference	&#1505;	&#x5E1;	&#1827;	&#x723;	&#1828;	&#x724;	&#2062;	&#x80E;

Character information
Preview	𐎒		𐡎		𐤎		𐢖	
Unicode name	UGARITIC LETTER SAMKA		IMPERIAL ARAMAIC LETTER SAMEKH		PHOENICIAN LETTER SEMKA		NABATAEAN LETTER SAMEKH	
Encodings	decimal	hex	dec	hex	dec	hex	dec	hex
Unicode	66450	U+10392	67662	U+1084E	67854	U+1090E	67734	U+10896
UTF-8	240 144 142 146	F0 90 8E 92	240 144 161 142	F0 90 A1 8E	240 144 164 142	F0 90 A4 8E	240 144 162 150	F0 90 A2 96
UTF-16	55296 57234	D800 DF92	55298 56398	D802 DC4E	55298 56590	D802 DD0E	55298 56470	D802 DC96
Numeric character reference	&#66450;	&#x10392;	&#67662;	&#x1084E;	&#67854;	&#x1090E;	&#67734;	&#x10896;

== See also ==
- Sin (letter)
