= Microturbulence =

Turbulence that varies over small distance scales

Microturbulence is a form of turbulence that varies over small distance scales. (Large-scale turbulence is called macroturbulence.)

== Stellar ==
Microturbulence is one of several mechanisms that can cause broadening of the absorption lines in the stellar spectrum. Stellar microturbulence varies with the effective temperature and the surface gravity.

The microturbulent velocity is defined as the microscale non-thermal component of the gas velocity in the region of spectral line formation. Convection is the mechanism believed to be responsible for the observed turbulent velocity field, both in low mass stars and massive stars. When examined by a spectroscope, the velocity of the convective gas along the line of sight produces Doppler shifts in the absorption bands. It is the distribution of these velocities along the line of sight that produces the microturbulence broadening of the absorption lines in low mass stars that have convective envelopes. In massive stars convection can be present only in small regions below the surface; these sub-surface convection zones can excite turbulence at the stellar surface through the emission of acoustic and gravity waves. The strength of the microturbulence (symbolized by ξ, in units of km s^{−1}) can be determined by comparing the broadening of strong lines versus weak lines.

== Magnetic nuclear fusion ==
Microturbulence plays a critical role in energy transport during magnetic nuclear fusion experiments, such as the Tokamak.
