= Lectionary 152 =

Lectionary ℓ 152
- New Testament manuscript
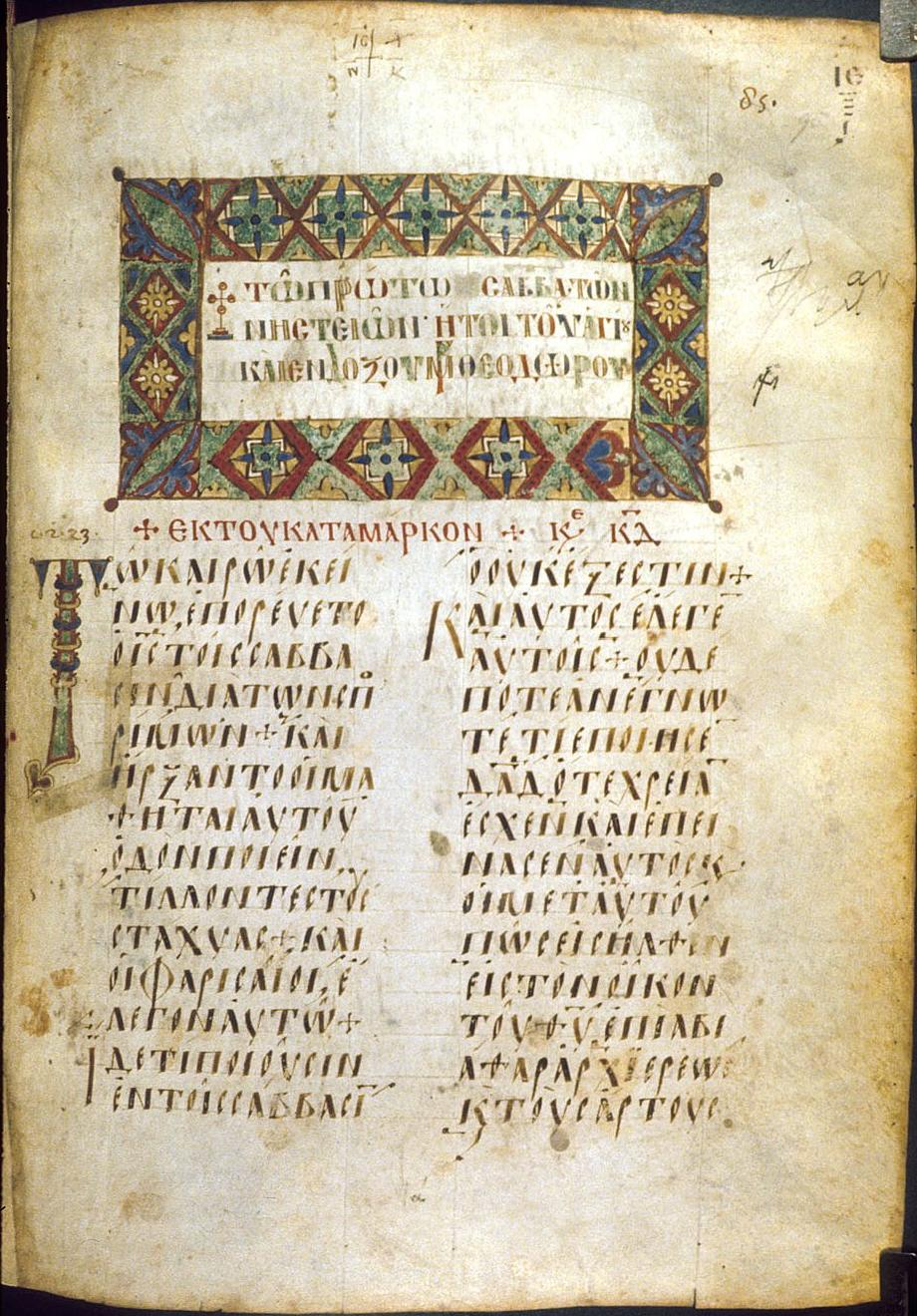
- Folio 95
- Name: Codex Prusensis
- Text: Evangelistarion
- Date: 9th century
- Script: Greek
- Now at: British Library
- Size: 31.5 by 23 cm

Lectionary 152, designated by siglum ℓ 152 (in the Gregory-Aland numbering) is a Greek manuscript of the New Testament, on parchment leaves. Paleographically it has been assigned to the 9th century.

== Description ==
The codex contains Lessons from the Gospels of John, Matthew, Luke lectionary (Evangelistarium) with some lacunae. It is written in Greek uncial letters, on 224 parchment leaves (31.5 cm by 23 cm), in two columns per page, 24-25 lines per page.

It has decorated headpieces and initial letters. Headpieces are with geometric and foliate decoration in gold or silver. The initial for epsilon has anthropomorphic motive with blessing hand (see illustration).

The manuscript is ornamented, the uncials leaning to the right, a fine copy, with small uncial notes.

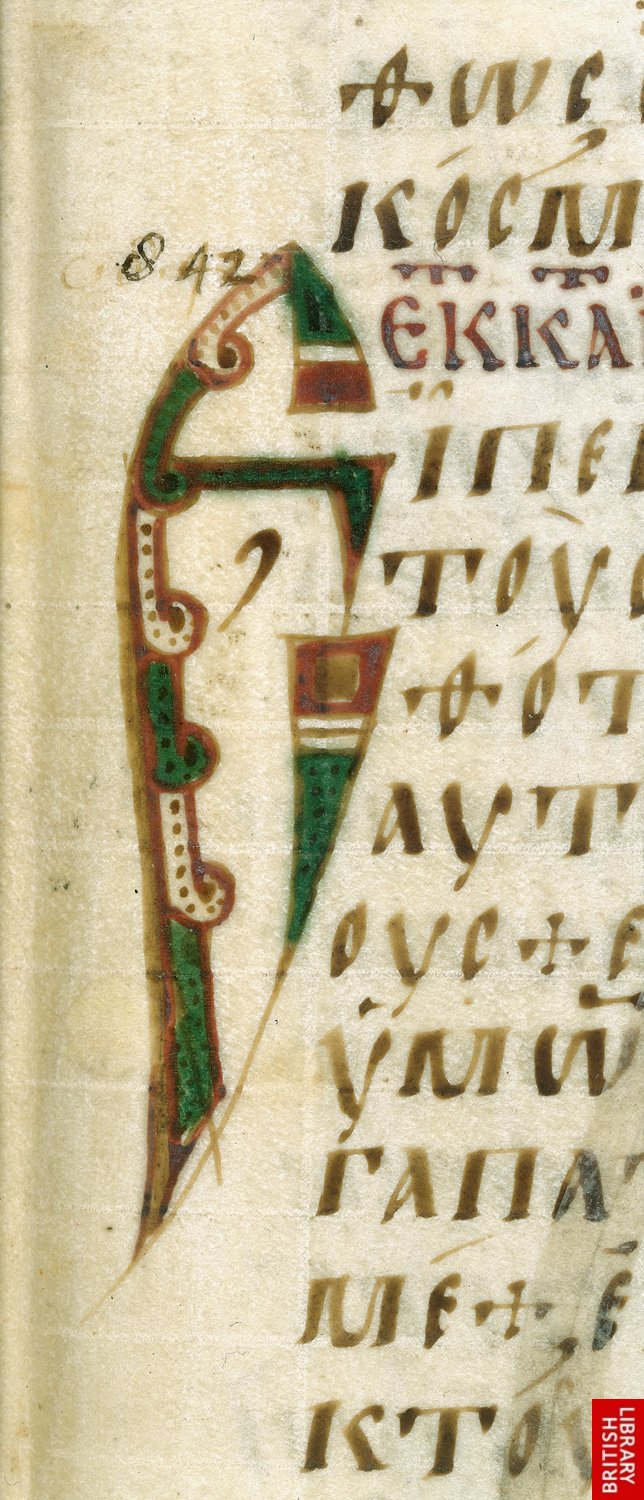
folio 21, decorated initial for epsilon

== History ==
The manuscript was named Codex Prusensis from Bursa (in Anatolia or Bithynia).

It was acquired by John Covel, who was a chaplain of the Levant Company in Constantinople between 1670-1676, who brought it to England in the 1670s. After 1676 Covel worked at the Christ's College in Cambridge. He sold it to Robert Harley on 27 February 1715 (i.e. 1716).

The manuscript was examined by Gregory (1883).

The manuscript is not cited in the critical editions of the Greek New Testament (UBS3).

Currently the codex is located in the British Library (Harley MS 5787).

== See also ==
- List of New Testament lectionaries
- Biblical manuscript
- Textual criticism

== Bibliography ==
- A Catalogue of the Harleian Manuscripts in the British Museum, 4 vols (London: Eyre and Strahan, 1808-12), III (1808), no. 5787.
- E. Maunde Thompson and G. F. Warner, Catalogue of Ancient Manuscripts in the British Museum, 2 vols (London: British Museum, 1881-1884), Part I Greek (1881), p. 23, pl. 17.
