= Lectionary 179 =

Lectionary ℓ 179
- New Testament manuscript
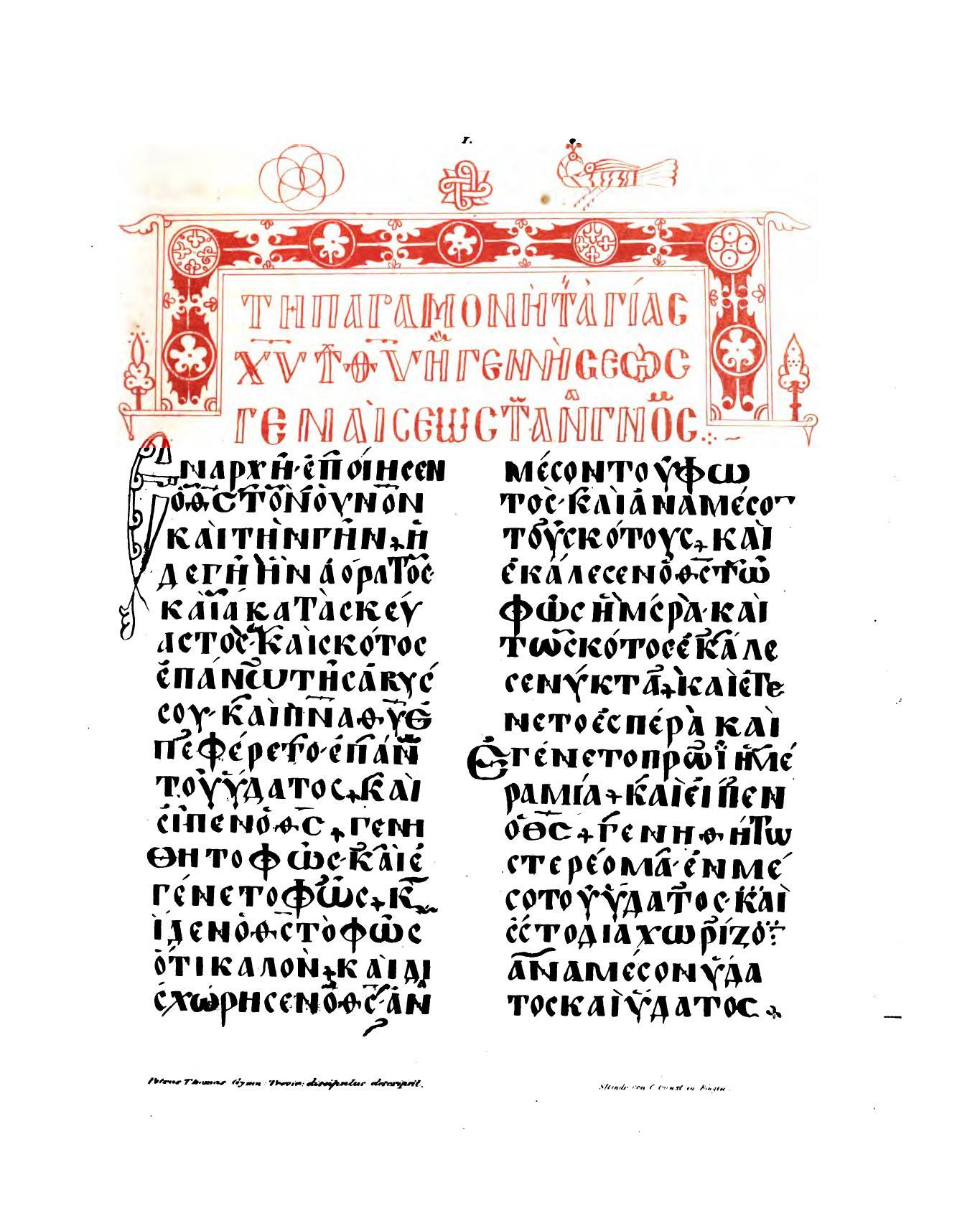
- First page of the Prophetologion
- Name: Codex Sancti Simeonis
- Text: Prophetologion (and Evangelistarion)
- Date: 10th century
- Script: Greek
- Now at: Domschatz
- Size: 25.8 by 19.7 cm

Codex Sancti Simeonis contains a fragment of a Gospel lectionary, or Evangelistarion, designated by siglum ℓ 179 in the Gregory-Aland numbering; it is written on parchment and dated to the 10th century. The codex is housed in Trier.

== Description ==
The codex consists of two different manuscripts: the first eight folios are a fragment of a lectionary of the Gospels (= lectionary 179), the remaining 130 folios are a lectionary of the Old Testament (Prophetologion). The whole codex is written on parchment leaves measuring 25.8 cm by 19.7 cm, only eight of which contain New Testament lessons.

The text of lectionary 179 is written in Greek uncial letters in two columns of 19 lines to a page. It uses rough and smooth breathings, accents, and stichometrical points, not spaces, between the words. The Prophetologion contains decorated headpieces; both manuscripts have decorated initial letters and musical notes in red. Itacism occurs frequently, for example: αι and η for ε, ει for ι, ω for ο, υ for οι.

The nomina sacra and other words are written in abbreviated form. The following words are abbreviated: και (and), πατηρ (father), μητηρ (mother), υιος (son), θυγατηρ (daughter), ανθρωπος (man), Θεος (God), Κυριος (Lord), σωτηρ (saviour), πνευμα (spirit), ουρανος (heaven), Αβρααμ (Abraham), Δαυιδ (David), Χριστος (Christ), Ιερουσαλημ (Jerusalem). These abbreviations in mainly the same as in the Codex Alexandrinus.

The Prophetologion has some unusual readings that occur rarely or not at all in other manuscripts. In Genesis 12:4, for example, it has: θεος (God) instead of Κυριος (the Lord). It has many grammatical corrections and marginal notes, giving readings close to the Codex Vaticanus and Codex Alexandrinus. The text has been collated in the edition of the Prophetologion by Monumenta Musicae Byzantinae.

== History ==
Scrivener and Gregory dated the manuscript to the 10th or 11th century. The Institute for New Testament Textual Research now assigns the Evangelistarion fragment to the 10th century on paleographical grounds. Scrivener thinks that it was brought out of Syria in the 11th century. A note at the end of the Prophetologion reads "Λαβρετιος, ἱερομοναχος σιναιτης, ὁ παλαιολογος, ἐν μηνι δεκεμβριου, κα ᾳφπε", which may be translated as: "Laurentius, monk from Sinai, of the Palaeologus family, in the month of December, the 21st day, in the year 1585". This means that at the end of the 16th century the manuscript was probably located in the West, since it does not make sense to stress that you are from Sinai if you are still at Sinai.

The codex was added to the list of Greek New Testament manuscripts by Scholz. Formerly it was labelled as Lectionary 179^{e} (for Evangelistarion) and 55^{a} (for "Apostolarion", probably the Prophetologion) by F. H. A. Scrivener and C. R. Gregory. Gregory assigned the single number 179 to it in 1908. Both Gregory and Aland restrict the number 179 to the Evangelistarion fragment ff. 2-9 (today: ff 1* - 8*) of the codex, whereas the Prophetologion does not have a number.

R. M. Steininger produced an edition of the text of both Evangelistarion fragment and Prophetologion with two plates in 1834. Caspar René Gregory saw the manuscript in 1884. It was examined in 1895 by Georg Flügel, who published a description with four plates. S.G.Engberg described both the Evangelistarion fragment and the Prophetologion.

The manuscript is not cited in the UBS3 or UBS4 critical editions of the Greek New Testament. It is held in the Domschatz museum in Trier.

== See also ==
- List of New Testament lectionaries
- Biblical manuscript
- Textual criticism

== Bibliography ==
- Richard Maria Steininger (1834). Codex Sancti Simeonis: Exhibens Lectionarum Ecclesiae Graecae DCCC Circiter Annorum Vetustate Insigne (in Latin). Augustae Trevirorum.
- Georg Flügel, Lic. Dr. Karl Hamanns Bemerkungen zum Codex S. Simeonis, Verlag der Fr. Lintz'schen Buchhandlung (1895).
- Prophetologium. Pars prima lectiones anni mobilis continens, ed. Carsten Höeg, Günther Zuntz, Gudrun Engberg, Hauniae, 1939–1970. Pars altera lectiones anni immobilis continens, ed. Gudrun Engberg, Hauniae, 1980-1981 (Monumenta Musicae Byzantinae, Lectionaria I).
- Sysse Gudrun Engberg, "Trier and Sinai: Saint Symeon’s Book," Scriptorium LIX.2, 2005, 132-146 & pl. 19–24.
