= Ksi (Cyrillic) =

Letter of the early Cyrillic alphabet

- Ѯ ѯ

Usage
- Writing system: Cyrillic
- Type: Alphabetic
- Language of origin: Old Church Slavonic
- Sound values: [ks]
- In Unicode: U+046E, U+046F
- Alphabetical position: 42

History
- Development: 𓊽 (possibly): 𐤎; Ξ ξ; Ѯ ѯ
- Time period: c. 893–1708, 1710–1735

Other
- Associated numbers: 60 (Cyrillic numerals)

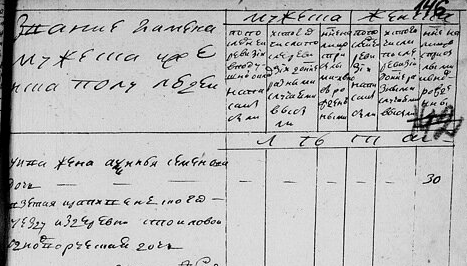
An example of the use of ksi after it was formally abolished: a civil census 1782 (GATO, f. 389, cat. 1, case 2, p. 146): Жена Аѯинья Семенова дочь — 30…

Ksi (Ѯ, ѯ italics: Ѯ ѯ) is a letter of the Cyrillic script. It is a letter of the early Cyrillic alphabet, derived from the Greek letter Xi (Ξ ξ). It was mainly used in Greek loanwords, especially words relating to the Church.

Unlike other eliminated letters such as omega and yus, ksi was a later borrowing from Greek and does not appear in any form in the Glagolitic script, which was used until the Middle Ages.

Ksi was eliminated from the Russian alphabet along with psi, omega, and yus in the civil script of 1708 (Peter the Great's Grazhdanka), and has also been dropped from other secular languages. It was briefly restored in 1710 and ultimately deleted in 1735. While it was no longer used in typographic fonts, it continued to be used by the church, and since clergy actively participated in civil censuses, ksi can be found in multiple handwritten civil texts all the way until the early 1800s.

In Russian and other Slavic languages, ksi is transcribed кс (ks) /ks/ and гз (gz) /gz/.

The Russian surname "Apraksin" (Апраѯінᲆ; modern: Апраксин) in the civil script. The variant form of ksi above is formed from an izhitsa with a tail.

In the civil script during Peter the Great's time, ksi was also written similarly to an izhitsa with a tail.

Ksi constituted the number "60" in the Cyrillic numeral system.

== Computing codes ==
Character information
Preview	Ѯ		ѯ	
Unicode name	CYRILLIC CAPITAL LETTER KSI		CYRILLIC SMALL LETTER KSI	
Encodings	decimal	hex	dec	hex
Unicode	1134	U+046E	1135	U+046F
UTF-8	209 174	D1 AE	209 175	D1 AF
Numeric character reference	&#1134;	&#x46E;	&#1135;	&#x46F;

== Related letters and other similar characters ==
- X x : Latin letter X
- Х х : Cyrillic letter Kha
- Ξ ξ : Greek letter Xi
