= Koppa =

Archaic letter of the Greek alphabet

Koppa or Qoppa (UK: /ˈkɒpə/, US: /ˈkɑːpə/; uppercase: Ϙ, lowercase: ϙ, numeral: ϟ) is a letter that was used in early forms of the Greek alphabet, derived from Phoenician qoph ⟨𐤒⟩. It was originally used to denote the /k/ sound, but dropped out of use as an alphabetic character and replaced by kappa ⟨Κ⟩. It has remained in use as a numeral symbol (90) in the system of Greek numerals, although with a modified shape. Koppa is the source of Latin Q, as well as the Cyrillic numeral sign of the same name (koppa).

== Alphabetic ==
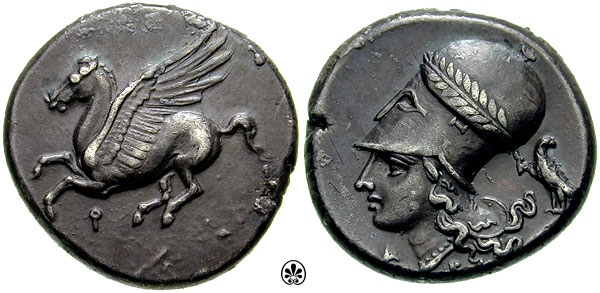
Corinthian stater. Obverse: Pegasus with koppa beneath, for Corinth. Reverse: Athena wearing a Corinthian helmet.

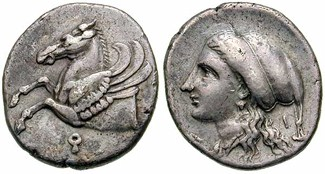
Corinthian hemiobol. Obverse: Pegasus with koppa beneath, for Corinth. Reverse: Aphrodite wearing a sakkos headband.

In Phoenician, qoph was pronounced [q]; in Greek, which lacked such a sound, it was instead used for /k/ before back vowels Ο, Υ and Ω. In this function, it was borrowed into the Italic alphabets and ultimately into Latin. However, as the sound /k/ had two redundant spellings, koppa was eventually replaced by kappa (Κ) in Greek. It remained in use as a letter in some Doric regions into the 5th century BC.

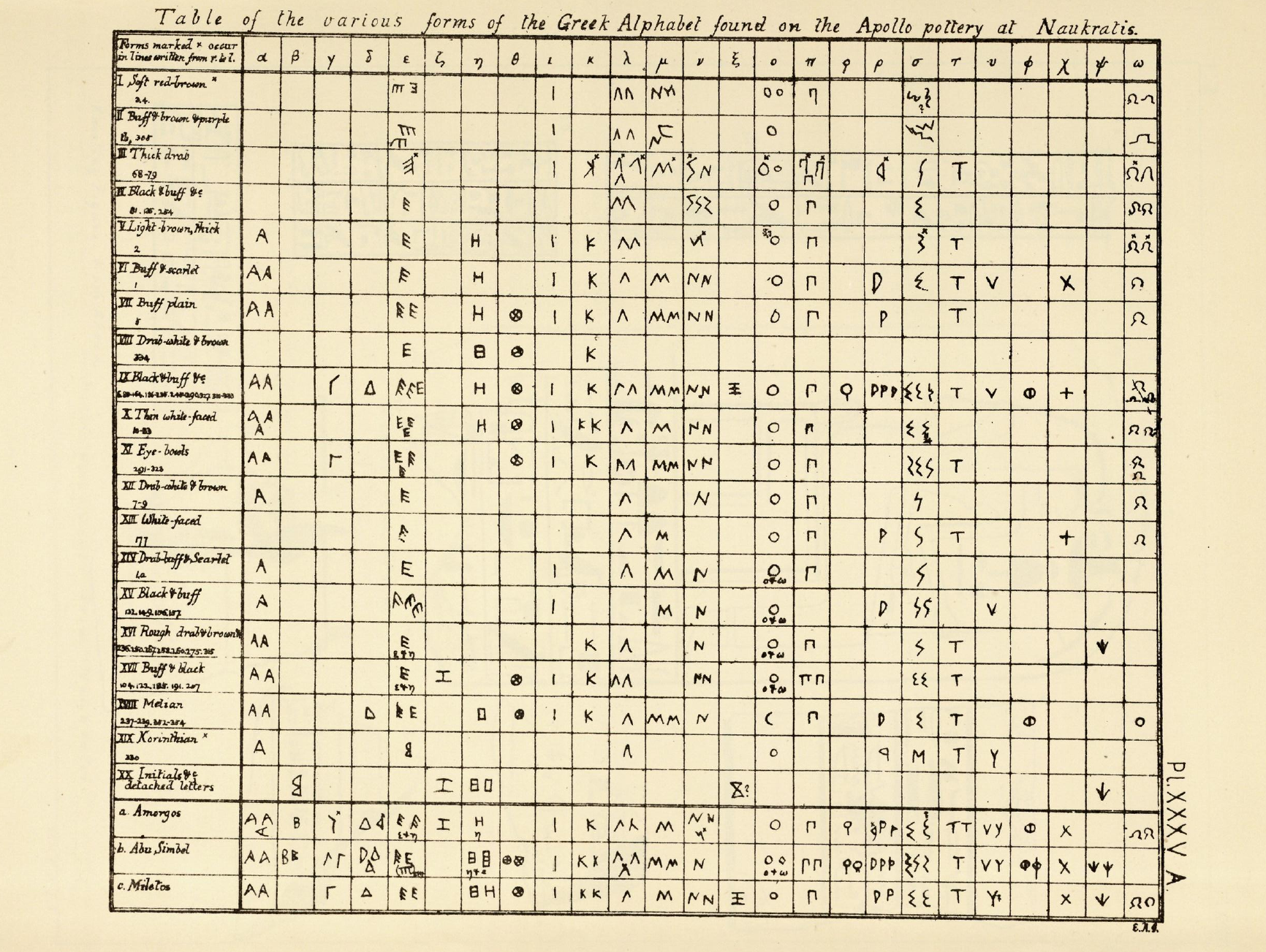
Greek alphabets of Petrie's Naukratis I with qoppa

The koppa was used as a symbol for the city of Corinth, which was originally spelled Ϙόρινθος Qórinthos in Doric Greek.

== Numeric ==
Koppa remained in use in the system of Milesian Greek numerals, where it had the value of 90. It has continued to be used in this function into modern times, though its shape has changed over time. In the Greek cursive script, the Q-like shape with a closed circle on top (handwritten as) was often broken up at the side or at the top. These are also the shapes in which it was borrowed into the early Cyrillic alphabet (Ҁ), as well as into the Gothic alphabet (𐍁), in both cases with the same numeric function. In modern Church Slavonic, a similar-looking but unrelated letter Ч is used instead of the former. Similarly, in the Coptic script, the identical-looking sign ϥ is also used as a numeral for 90, although as an alphabetic letter it has an unrelated sound value, /f/, derived from Egyptian demotic. Later, in minuscule handwriting, the shape changed further into a simple zigzag line.

Example of a 19th-century font using S-shaped capital stigma (first row) and G-shaped capital koppa next to sampi (second row) .

Example of a 19th-century font using turned-lamedh-shaped capital koppa and G-shaped capital stigma. (Translation: Psalm 96)

Stigma and koppa in modern fonts. Just as in historical typesetting practice, some versions of stigma may be indistinguishable from some versions of koppa.

== Typography ==
Modern typography of the numeral koppa has most often employed some version of the Z-shaped character. It may appear in several variants: as a simple geometrical lightning-bolt shape; with the top part curved rightward, evoking to some degree the original uncial form; in a characteristic shape with a shorter top arm slightly curved to the left, resembling a Hebrew letter lamedh; or with the same lamedh shape turned upside down. Other variants common in older print include shapes based on the open uncial form. Some of these shapes may be indistinguishable from realizations of the other Greek numeral, stigma, in other fonts. Koppa has also been replaced by a lowercase Latin "q", a mirrored uppercase "P", or a "5" turned upside down.

As with the numeral usage of stigma (digamma) and sampi, modern typographical practice normally does not observe a contrast between uppercase and lowercase forms for numeric koppa.

== Unicode ==
The Unicode character encoding standard originally (since version 1.1 of 1993), had only a single code point for koppa, which was marked as uppercase and could be used either for an epigraphic or a numeral glyph, depending on font design. A lowercase form was encoded in version 3.0 (1999). A second pair of code points specifically for the original closed epigraphical shape was introduced in version 3.2 (2002). This left the older two code points (U+03DE/U+03DF, Ϟϟ) to cover primarily the numeral glyphs.

As of 2010, coverage of these code points in common computer fonts is therefore still inconsistent: while the most commonly used version of the numeral glyph will be located at the lowercase code point U+03DF in recent fonts, older fonts may either have no character at all or a version of the closed epigraphic form at that position. Conversely, older fonts may have the numeral glyph at the uppercase code point, while this position may be filled with any of several less common glyphs in newer ones. Since there had never been a consistent typographic tradition for a specifically uppercase numeral koppa, the typographer Yannis Haralambous proposed two new variants for it, and, noting that he himself found them not "entirely satisfactory". A serifed version similar to his koppa was adopted as the reference glyph for the Unicode code charts, along with a lowercase form with heavy curved arms and pointed angles:. Some current Unicode fonts have adopted these new shapes, while many font designers have opted for some combination of the more traditional glyphs, including the uncial and the lamedh-shaped ones.

- U+03D8 Ϙ GREEK LETTER ARCHAIC KOPPA
- U+03D9 ϙ GREEK SMALL LETTER ARCHAIC KOPPA
- U+03DE Ϟ GREEK LETTER KOPPA
- U+03DF ϟ GREEK SMALL LETTER KOPPA
- U+0480 Ҁ CYRILLIC CAPITAL LETTER KOPPA
- U+0481 ҁ CYRILLIC SMALL LETTER KOPPA
- U+10341 𐍁 GOTHIC LETTER NINETY
