= Cyrillization of German =

Cyrillization of German is the conversion of text written in the German Latin alphabet into the Cyrillic alphabet, according to rules based on pronunciation. Because German orthography is largely phonemic, transcription into Cyrillic follows relatively simple rules.

The most common cyrillization method is the one based on the Russian Cyrillic alphabet. It is officially employed in Russian-language media.

== Transcription rules ==
The standard rules for orthographic transcription into Russian were developed by Rudzhero S. Giliarevski (ru) and Boris A. Starostin (ru) in 1969 for various languages; they have been revised by later scholars including D. I. Ermolovich (ru) and I. S. Alexeyeva (ru). The established spellings of a few names which were already common before this time sometimes deviates from these rules; for example, the Ludwig is traditionally Людвиг (including in placenames), with ю instead of у. It was also historically common to render personal names into their Russian forms or cognates, rather than strictly transliterating them, as with Peter being rendered as Пётр. German phonemes which do not exist in Russian are rendered by their closest approximations: the umlauts ö and ü are rendered as ё (yo) and ю (yu), and ä and e are mostly rendered as е (not э). H (when not part of a cluster) is now rendered with х or omitted (when silent); it was historically often rendered with г (g), as in the name of Heinrich Heine (Russian: Генрих Гейне). The Cyrillic letters ы and щ are not used.

German original	Russian transcription	Bulgarian transcription
a	а (but at the end of a word, following i, я is used: Bavaria → Бавария)	
aa	а (Aachen → Ахен)	
ae	transcribed like ä when it stands for that letter; otherwise, transcribed like a + e	depending on pronunciation
ai	ай (Mainz → Майнц)	
ay	ай	
ä	е after consonants, э after vowels and at the beginning of a word	е
äu	ой (historically also ей: Bäumler → Беймлер)	ой
b	б	
c	as к (Calw → Кальв) or ц (Celle → Целле) depending on pronunciation	as к or ц depending on pronunciation
ch	х (or, in loanwords, ш, ч, к etc. based on pronunciation) (Chiemsee → Кимзе, historically also Химзе)	к at the start of the word (Chiemsee → Кимзе); х after vowels (Achim → Ахим)
chh	хг (traditionally), or хх (modern variant) (Hochhuth → Хоххут; Eichhorn → Айххорн)	хх if ch and h belong to different morphemes (Hochheim → Хоххайм)
chs	кс, when pronounced as x, otherwise transcribed like ch + s	
ck	к, or between vowels (and always, according to the rules for transcribing geographic names) кк (Boris Becker → Борис Беккер)	к
d	д	
e	е after consonants, э after vowels and at the beginning of a word (Erfurt → Эрфурт)	е
ee	like e (Spree → Шпре)	ее
ei	ай (Eider → Айдер) (historically also эй, ей: Einstein → Эйнштейн)	ай
eu	ой (Neumünster → Ноймюнстер) (historically also эй, ей: Neumann → Нейман)	ой
ey	ай (Eider → Айдер) (historically also эй, ей: Meyer → Мейер)	ай
f	ф	
g	г (in loanwords, before e, i, y, sometimes ж or дж based on pronunciation)	г
gk	гк (Woldegk → Вольдегк), sometimes г (Burgkmair → Бургмайр)	?
h	х, when pronounced: Herne → Херне; Dietharz → Дитхарц; omitted when silent: Ehenbichl → Ээнбихль, Lahr → Лар (historically also transcribed with г)	х at the start of a word or morpheme; otherwise not transcribed
i	и at the beginning of a word or after consonants, й after vowels	
ie	и when e indicates a long i, ие when divided between two syllables (Marienberg → Мариенберг)	
j	й at the end of a syllable; at the beginning of a word or between vowels, ja → я, jä → е, je → е, jo → йо, jö → йё, ju → ю, jü → йю; after consonants: ja → ья, jä → ье, je → ье, jo → ьо, jö → ьё, ju → ью, jü → ью; when between parts of a compound word, then ъ instead of ь	depending on the following vowel: ja → я; je, jä → йе (only at the start of the word or after a vowel, otherwise: е); ju, jü, jui → ю
k	к	
l	л before vowels, ль before consonants or at the end of a word (exceptions include Karl → Карл); after l, u becomes ю instead of у in some traditional cases (Ludwigsburg → Людвигсбург)	л
ll	лл except between consonants and vowels; at the end of a word -ь is appended (exceptions include Rheinmetall → Рейнметалл)	л
m	м	
n	н (but -mann → -ман)	
o	о	
oe	transcribed like ö when it stands for that letter; if it stands for a long o then transcribed as о: Coesfeld → Косфельд; if the two letters form separate syllables, then transcribed like o + e	transcribed like ö when it stands for that letter; if it stands for a long o then transcribed as о: Coesfeld → Косфелд; if the two letters form separate syllables, then transcribed like o + e: Buchloe → Бухлое
oo	о (Koopmann → Копман)	
ö	э at the beginning of a word, otherwise ё (Österreich (as a last name) → Эстеррайх)	ьо after a consonant, otherwise йо
p	п	
ph	ф, unless divided by a syllable boundary: Diepholz → Дипхольц	ф, unless divided by a syllable boundary: Diepholz → Дипхолц
qu	кв (Querfurt → Кверфурт)	
r	р	
s	з for /z/, с for /s/: Sassnitz → Засниц, Kiste → Кисте	likewise: з at the start of the word or if between vowels (or between a vowel and a sonorant), in all other cases: с
sch	ш	
sp	шп at the beginning of a word (including inside compound words), otherwise сп	
ss	сс or с (when ss stands for ß, then с), unless divided between two syllables: Ludwigsstadt → Людвигсштадт	s unless at morpheme boundary
st	шт at the beginning of a word (including inside compound words), otherwise ст: Rostock → Росток	щ at the beginning of a word (including inside compound words), otherwise ст
ß	с	
t	т, but the suffix -tion → -цион	
tsch	ч (unless divided between two syllables, in which case тш: Altschul → Альтшуль)	ч
tz	тц between vowels, otherwise ц (Ratzeburg → Ратцебург)	ц: Рацебург
u	у	
ue	transcribed like ü when it stands for that letter; if it stands for a long u then transcribed as у: Buer → Бур; if the two letters form separate syllables, then transcribed like u + e: Adenauer → Аденауэр	transcribed like ü when it stands for that letter; if it stands for a long u then transcribed as у: Buer → Бур; if the two letters form separate syllables, then transcribed like u + e: Adenauer → Аденауер
ü	и at the beginning of a word, otherwise ю (Neumünster → Ноймюнстер, Uelzen → Ильцен)	ю
v	ф when pronounced like f; в when pronounced like w	
w	в (Wagner → Вагнер)	
x	кс	
y	и at the beginning of a word and after consonants (even when pronounced as ü) (Bad Pyrmont → Бад-Пирмонт), й after vowels; as a consonant, ya → я (Yanina Wickmayer → Янина Викмайер)	
z	ц	
zsch	ч (unless divided between two syllables, in which case цш: so, Delitzsch → Делич, but Nietzsche → Ницше)	

== Sample text ==
=== Article 1 of the Universal Declaration of Human Rights ===
Original	German Cyrillic	Transliteration	Scientific transliteration
Alle Menschen sind frei und gleich an Würde und Rechten geboren. Sie sind mit Vernunft und Gewissen begabt und sollen einander im Geist der Brüderlichkeit begegnen.	Алле Меншен зинд фрай унд глайх ан Вюрде унд Рехтен геборен. Зи зинд мит Фернунфт унд Гевисен бегабт унд золлен айнандер им Гайст дер Брюдерлихкайт бегегнен.	Alle Menshen zind fray und glaykh an Vyurde und Rekhten geboren. Zi zind mit Fernunft und Gevisen begabt und zollen aynander im Gayst der Bryuderlikhkayt begegnen.	Alle Menšen zind fraj und glajch an Vjurde und Rechten geboren. Zi zind mit Fernunft und Gevisen begabt und zollen ajnander im Gajst der Brjuderlichkajt begegnen.

== See also ==
- Cyrillization
- Hebraization of German
