= Cyrillization of French =

Transliteration of French into Russian Cyrillic script

Russian uses phonetic transcription for the Cyrillization of its many loanwords from French. Some use is made of Cyrillic's iotation features to represent French's front rounded vowels and etymologically-softened consonants.

== Consonants ==
In the table below, the symbol ⟨ʲ⟩ represents either a "softened" consonant or the approximant /j/. When applicable, a softened consonant can be indicated in transcription either by a following iotated vowel or by ⟨ь⟩.

Russian transcription of French consonants
French		Russian transcription	Examples	Comments
phoneme(s)	grapheme(s)	Russian transcription	Examples	Comments
[b]	b	б	bateau-lavoir – бато-лавуар	
[ʃ]	ch	ш	Charles – Шарль	
[d]	d	д	Bordeaux – Бордо	
[f]	f, ph	ф	Foucault – Фуко	
[ɡ]	g, gu	г	Guillaume – Гийом	
[ɲ]	gn	нь	Boulogne – Булонь	
–	h	–	Humanité – Юманите	
–	h	г	Hugo – Гюго; Le Havre – Гавр	often in the case of h aspiré
[ʒ]	j, g(e)	ж	Jean – Жан	
[k]	c, qu, k	к	Camus – Камю	
[l]	l	ль	Gilbert – Жильбер	before a consonant or at the end of a word
[l]	l	л	Louvre – Лувр	before vowels
[lj]	li	ль	Montpellier – Монпелье	
[m]	m	м	monde – монд	
[n]	n	н	Rhône – Рона	
[ŋ]	ng	нг		
[p]	p	п	Pierre – Пьер	
[ʁ]	r	р	Renoir – Ренуар	
[s]	s, ç, c	с	Rousseau – Руссо	
[sj]	ti	сь	Libération – Либерасьон	
[t]	t	т	pointe – пуэнт	
[v]	v	в	Verlaine – Верлен	
[w]	w	в	Gwénaël – Гвенаэль	sometimes transliterated with ⟨у⟩ in loanwords from English
[ks] [kz] [gz]	x	кс кз гз	Xavier – Ксавье Saint-Exupéry – Сент-Экзюпери	according to the pronunciation of the ⟨x⟩
[j]	y, i, il(l)	й	yeuse – йёз Bayard – Байяр; Guillaume – Гийом	after a vowel or word-initially
[j]	y, i, il(l)	ь	Lavoisier – Лавуазье	after a consonant
[j]	il(l)	ль	Marseille – Марсель	frozen form
[z]	z, s	з	Vierzon – Вьерзон	

Doubled French consonants remain doubled in their Russian transcription: Rousseau – Руссо. Silent consonants (common in French) are generally not transcribed, except where they exist in the surface form due to liaison.

== Vowels ==
Russian transcription of French vowels
French		Russian transcription	Examples	Comments
phoneme(s)	grapheme(s)	Russian transcription	Examples	Comments
[a], [ɑ]	a, â	а	Charles – Шарль	
[e], [ɛ]	é, è, ê, ai, e	е	René – Рене	
[e], [ɛ]	é, è, ê, ai, e	э	Edmond – Эдмон; Citroën – Ситроэн	at the beginning of a word, following a vowel, or rarely for [ɛ] at the end of a word
[ø], [œ]	eu, œ, œu	ё	Villedieu – Вильдьё	⟨ё⟩ is generally simplified to ⟨е⟩ in Russian
[ø], [œ]	eu, œ, œu	э	Eugène – Эжен; Maheu – Маэ	at the beginning of a word, or after a vowel
[ə], —	e	–	Charles – Шарль	e muet
[ə], —	e	е	De Gaulle – Де Голль	only in cases where [ə] is usually pronounced, e.g., le, de, que, rebelle, etc.
[i]	i, y	и	Village – Виляж	
[o], [ɔ]	o, au, ô	o	Rhône – Рона	
[wa]	oi	уа	Troyes – Труа	
[u], [w]	ou	у	Louvre – Лувр	
[y], [ɥ]	u	ю	L'Humanité – Юманите	
[ɑ̃]	an, am, en, em	ан, ам	Ambroise – Амбруаз; Occidental – Оксиданталь	nasal vowels are written as the corresponding oral vowel followed by /n/ (or /m/ before /m, b, p/)
[ɛ̃]	in, en, ain	ен, ем, эн, эм	Saintes – Сент; Ain – Эн	nasal vowels are written as the corresponding oral vowel followed by /n/ (or /m/ before /m, b, p/)
[ɔ̃]	on, om	он, ом	Comte – Конт	nasal vowels are written as the corresponding oral vowel followed by /n/ (or /m/ before /m, b, p/)
[œ̃]	un	ен, ем, эн, эм	Verdun – Верден	nasal vowels are written as the corresponding oral vowel followed by /n/ (or /m/ before /m, b, p/)
[wɛ̃]	oin	уэн	pointe – пуэнт	nasal vowels are written as the corresponding oral vowel followed by /n/ (or /m/ before /m, b, p/)

Finally, the softened consonants modify the following vowels:

Palatalization
hard Russian vowel	softening		Examples	Comments
hard Russian vowel	After a vowel or ⟨й⟩	After a consonant or ⟨ь⟩	Examples	Comments
ʲа	я		cognac – коньяк Bayard – Байяр	
ʲе ; ʲё	ие, йе ; йё	ье ; ьё	trieur – триер Cahiers du cinéma – Кайе дю синема Richelieu – Ришелье	
э	⟨э⟩ never follows a softened consonant			
ʲи	йи	ьи	Tilly – Тийи	
ʲо	йо	ьо	Chillon – Шильон	
ʲу	ю			
ʲю	йю	ью		
ʲ	before a consonant or at the end of a word, softening is written with ⟨ь⟩			

Neither ⟨й⟩ nor ⟨ь⟩ are doubled.

== Bibliography ==
- Paul Garde, La Transcription des noms propres français en russe, Paris, Institut d'études slaves, 1974, 63 pages, 25 cm, collection « Documents pédagogiques de l'Institut d'études slaves » n° X, ISBN 2-7204-0090-4
