= Ustav =

Ustav may refer to:

- Typikon, liturgical book in Byzantine Rite churches
- Ustav (script), the uncial style of early Cyrillic writing, used from the 9th century to the 14th-15th centuries. This evolved into poluustav (semi-uncial, a type still in use for the Church Slavonic publishing); it later split into skoropis′ (the shorthand predecessor of modern Cyrillic cursive) and modern types of printed Cyrillic script. Since the 19th century, ustav-style Cyrillic fonts are used in academic publishing to reproduce Old Church Slavonic texts.
- Constitution in Serbo-Croatian and Macedonian
