= Cyrillization of Greek =

Cyrillization of Greek refers to the transcription or transliteration of text from the Greek alphabet to the Cyrillic script.

The Early Cyrillic alphabet included the entire Greek alphabet. However, as modern Cyrillic alphabets omit some Greek letters, and others had their pronunciation shift to no longer match their Greek counterparts, Greek names and loanwords are no longer spelled based on letter-to-letter correspondences in modern Cyrillic orthographies: For example, the name Γιάννης would never be transliterated as Гіаннис, but (for example) Яннис in Russian, Янніс in Ukrainian, Янис in Bulgarian, and Јанис in Serbian.

Correspondence of letters between the Greek and Early Cyrillic alphabets; obsolete Greek-originated letters are marked in blue; letters unique to Cyrillic are marked in green if actively used, and red if obsolete
Greek	Α α	—	Β β	Γ γ	Δ δ	Ε ε	—	Ϛ ϛ	Ζ ζ	Η η	Θ θ	Ι ι	Κ κ	Λ λ	Μ μ	Ν ν	Ξ ξ	Ο ο	Π π	Ϙ ϙ	Ρ ρ	Σ σ	Τ τ	Υ υ	Φ φ	Χ χ	Ψ ψ	Ω ω	—	—	—	—	—	—	—	—	—	—	—	—	—	—	—
Early Cyrillic	А а	Б б	В в	Г г	Д д	Е е (Note: The letter had two variants, the "narrow" ⟨Е е⟩ and the "broad" ⟨Є є⟩; the broad Є was more common in Early Cyrillic manuscripts. Later Cyrillic alphabets consider Е and Є distinct letters; Е is used in most Cyrillic scripts to represent the [e] or [je] sounds, depending on language, while Є is used exclusively in Ukrainian and Rusyn to represent [je].)	Ж ж	Ѕ ѕ (Note: The Early Cyrillic letter for [d͡z] was initially a Zeta variant, which had the form ⟨Ꙃ ꙃ⟩; by the 12th century, the [d͡z] sound was assimilated into Stigma, which was only used as a numeral before then.)	З з (Note: The letter originally had the form ⟨Ꙁ ꙁ⟩, which more closely resembled the Greek original; it later gradually shifted into the form ⟨З з⟩, with the two variants coexisting in the meantime.)	И и	Ѳ ѳ	І і (Note: The letter had two variants, the "dotless" ⟨І і⟩ and the "dotted" ⟨Ї ї⟩; the dotted Ї was more common in Early Cyrillic manuscripts. Later Cyrillic alphabets consider І and Ї distinct letters; І is used in Ukrainian, Belarusian, and Rusyn to represent the [i] sound, while Ї is used exclusively in Ukrainian and Rusyn to represent [ji].)	К к	Л л	М м	Н н	Ѯ ѯ	О о	П п	Ҁ ҁ	Р р	С с	Т т	У у (Note: The letter had two variants, the "tailed" ⟨У у⟩ and the "tailless" ⟨Ѵ ѵ⟩; the tailless Ѵ was more common in Early Cyrillic manuscripts. Later Cyrillic alphabets consider У and Ѵ distinct letters (У was initially only used in the digraph ⟨оу⟩/⟨оѵ⟩/⟨ꙋ⟩, corresponding to Greek ⟨ου⟩, and eventually supplanted it); in modern-day Cyrillic alphabets, only У is used, while Ѵ is obsolete.)	Ф ф	Х х	Ѱ ѱ	Ѡ ѡ	Ц ц	Ч ч	Ш ш	Щ щ	Ъ ъ	Ы ы	Ь ь	Ѣ ѣ	Ꙗ ꙗ (Note: ⟨Ꙗ ꙗ⟩, ⟨Ѧ ѧ⟩, and ⟨Ѩ ѩ⟩ were all distinct letters in Early Cyrillic, but merged into the singular letter ⟨Я я⟩ in present-day Cyrillic alphabets)	Ѥ ѥ	Ю ю	Ѫ ѫ	Ѭ ѭ	Ѧ ѧ	Ѩ ѩ

== Greek-Russian orthographic transcription ==
The following system has been used to transcribe Modern Greek proper names and terms in Russian texts.

Greek	Note	Cyrillic	Example
α		а	Ελλάδα → Эллада
αι		э (word-initially), е (all other cases)	αιώνας → эонас, χαιρετάω → херетао
αϊ		ай	Ταϊβάν → Тайван
αυ	/af/ before a voiceless consonant; /av/ otherwise	ав	αυτό → авто, σαύρα → савра
β		в	βήτα → вита
γ		г	Γερμανία → Германия, γούπα → гупа
γι, γει, γυ	before vowels	й	Γιατρός → Ятрос [Йатрос]
γγ		нг	Άγγελος → Ангелос
γκ		г (word-initially), нг	Γκάνα → Гана, Έγκωμη → Энгоми
γχ		нх	
δ		д	Δανία → Дания
ε		э (word-initially), е (all other cases)	επευφημώ → эпевфимо
ει		и	
εϊ		эй	
ευ	/ef/ before a voiceless consonant; /ev/ otherwise	эв	
ζ		з	Ζαγορά → Загора
η		и	
θ		т (also ф)	Θεόδωρος → Теодорос (also Феодорос)
ι		и, й (before a vowel)	
κ		к	
λ		л	
μ		м	
μπ		б (word-initially), мп (within a word)	
ν		н	
ντ		д (word-initially), нт (within a word)	
ξ		кс	
ο		о	
οι		и	
οϊ		ой	
ου		у	
π		п	
ρ		р	
σ	/z/ before voiced consonants	с	
τ		т	
υ		и	
φ		ф	
χ		х	
ψ		пс	
ω		о	

== See also ==
- Cyrillization
- Pontic Greek
- Romanization of Greek
- Hebraization of Greek
