= Beur (disambiguation) =

Beur is a colloquial French term for European-born people whose parents or grandparents are immigrants from North Africa.

Beur or Beurs may also refer to:

- Beur Central Jail, the main prison of Bihar, India
- Beur FM, a French local radio station
- Beur TV, a French television station
- Beurs metro station, in Rotterdam, the Netherlands
- Beurs-World Trade Center, a commercial building in Rotterdam, the Netherlands
- Wilhelmus Beurs (1656–1700), a Dutch Golden Age painter

== See also ==
- Buer (disambiguation)
- Beurgeois, a French portmanteau neologism, meaning successful beurs
- Butter (French: beurre)
