= Ukrainian skoropys =

Form of Ukrainian handwriting

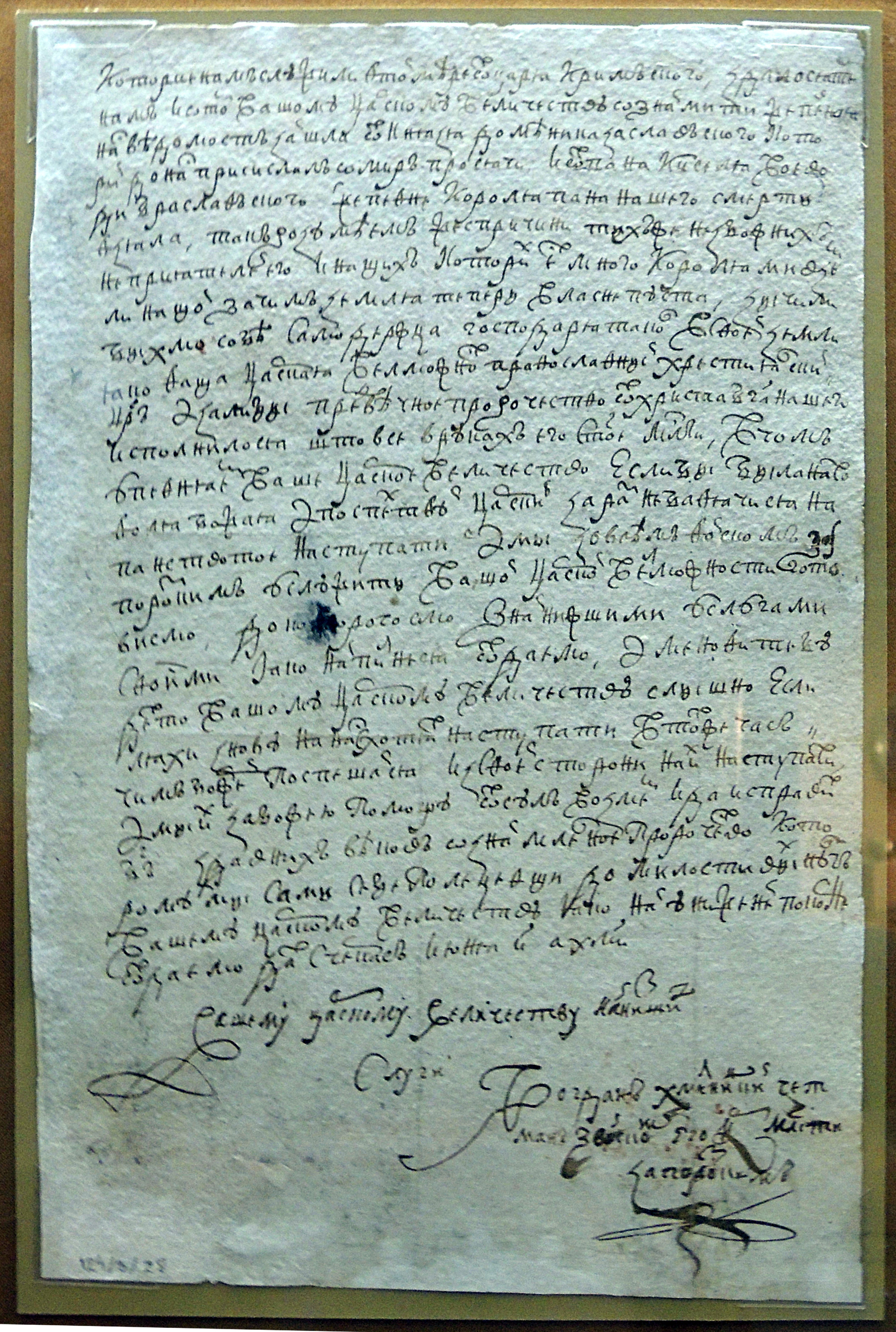
Bohdan Khmelnytskyi's letter to tsar Alexis

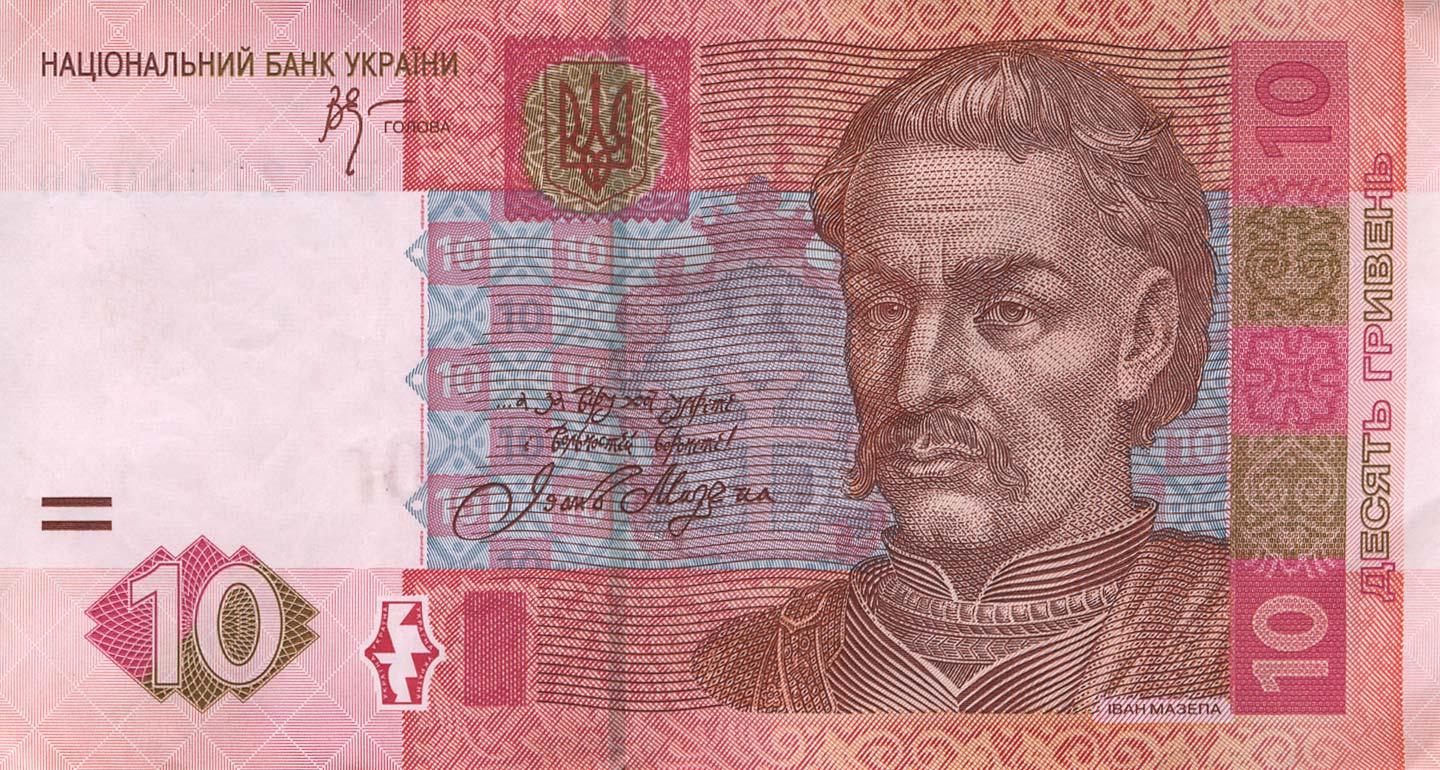
Ivan Mazepa's quote written in skoropys on a 10 hryvnia banknote

Ukrainian skoropys (Ukrainian: український скоропис) or Cossack skoropys (Ukrainian: козацький скоропис) is a type of Cyrillic handwriting script that was widely used in documents of the Cossack Hetmanate in the 16th to 18th centuries. "Skoropys" means "fast-writing style" in Ukrainian.

== See also ==
- Skoropis
- Ukrainian Baroque
