= Russian cursive =

Handwritten form of Russian Cyrillic

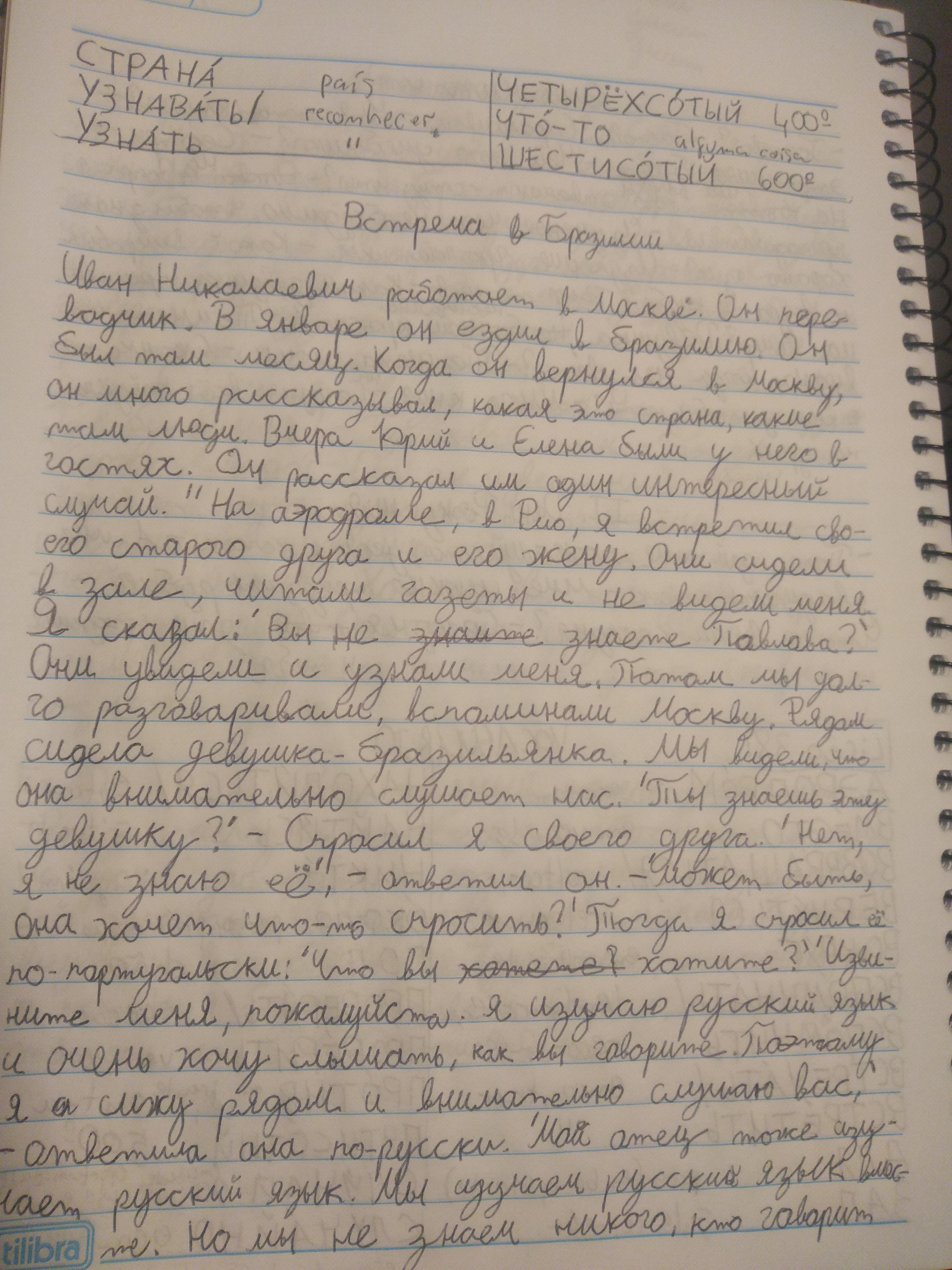
Text written by a foreign student in Russian cursive. The text is called Встреча в Бразилии (meeting in Brazil).

Russian cursive is a variant of the Russian alphabet used for writing by hand. It is typically referred to as (ру́сский) рукопи́сный шрифт (rússky) rukopísny shrift, "(Russian) handwritten script". It is the handwritten form of the modern Russian Cyrillic script, used instead of the block letters seen in printed material. In addition, Russian italics for lowercase letters are often based on Russian cursive (such as lowercase т, which resembles Latin m). Most handwritten Russian, especially in personal letters and schoolwork, uses the cursive alphabet. In Russian schools, most children are taught from first grade how to write in this script.

== History ==
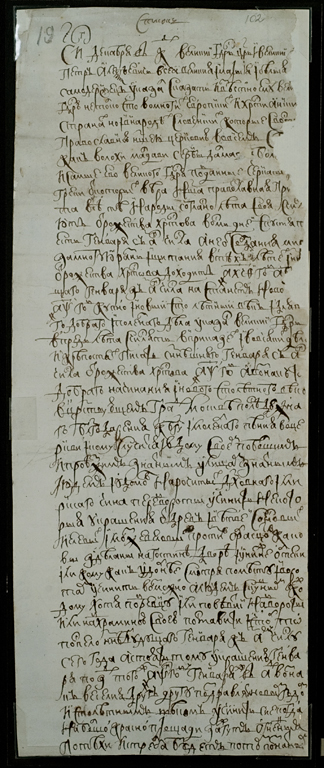
A ukase written in the 17th-century Russian chancery cursive

The Russian (as well as Cyrillic in general) cursive was developed during the 18th century on the base of the earlier Cyrillic tachygraphic writing (ско́ропись, skoropis, "rapid or running script"), which in turn was the 14th–17th-century chancery hand of the earlier Cyrillic bookhand scripts (called ustav and poluustav). It became the handwritten counterpart of so-called "civil" (or Petrine) printed script of books. In order, modern Cyrillic italic typefaces are based (in their lowercase part) mostly on the cursive shape of the letters.

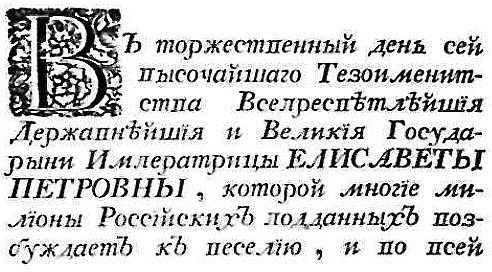
18th-century Russian italic font, note unusual "square" minuscule в

The resulting cursive bears many similarities with the Latin cursive. For example, the modern Russian cursive letter "п" may coincidentally resemble the Latin cursive "n" (𝓃), despite having completely different sound values; both upright and italic printed typefaces demonstrate less similarity.

One must not confuse the historical Russian chancery hand (ско́ропись, skóropis'), the contemporary Russian cursive (рукопи́сное письмо́, rukopísnoe pis'mó) and the contemporary Russian stenography. The latter is completely different from the other two, though it is sometimes called ско́ропись, skóropis', like the former.

== Features ==
Russian cursive is much like contemporary English and other Latin cursives. But unlike Latin handwriting, which can range from fully cursive to heavily resembling the printed typefaces and where idiosyncratic mixed systems are most common, it is standard practice to write in Russian cursive almost exclusively.

=== Ambiguities ===
There exists some ambiguity from the fact that several lowercase cursive letters consist (entirely or in part) of the element that is identical to the dotless Latin cursive letter ı, the cursive Greek letter ι or a half of the cursive letter u, namely и, л, м, ш, щ, ы. Therefore, certain combinations of these Russian letters cannot be unambiguously deciphered without knowing the language or without a broader context. For example, in the words волшебник, "magician" and домик, "little house" the combinations лш and ми are written identically. The word лишишь, for example, is "you will deprive" written in cursive consists almost exclusively of these elements. There are examples of different words that become absolutely identical in their cursive form, e.g. мщу "I avenge" and лицу (dative of лицо "face"). The most radical form of this, though not well known, is the Tajik word миллии meaning 'national'. It consists only of these elements.

Some words in Russian may pose a challenge due to the similarities between the letters Ш, Щ, И, Л, М in cursive.

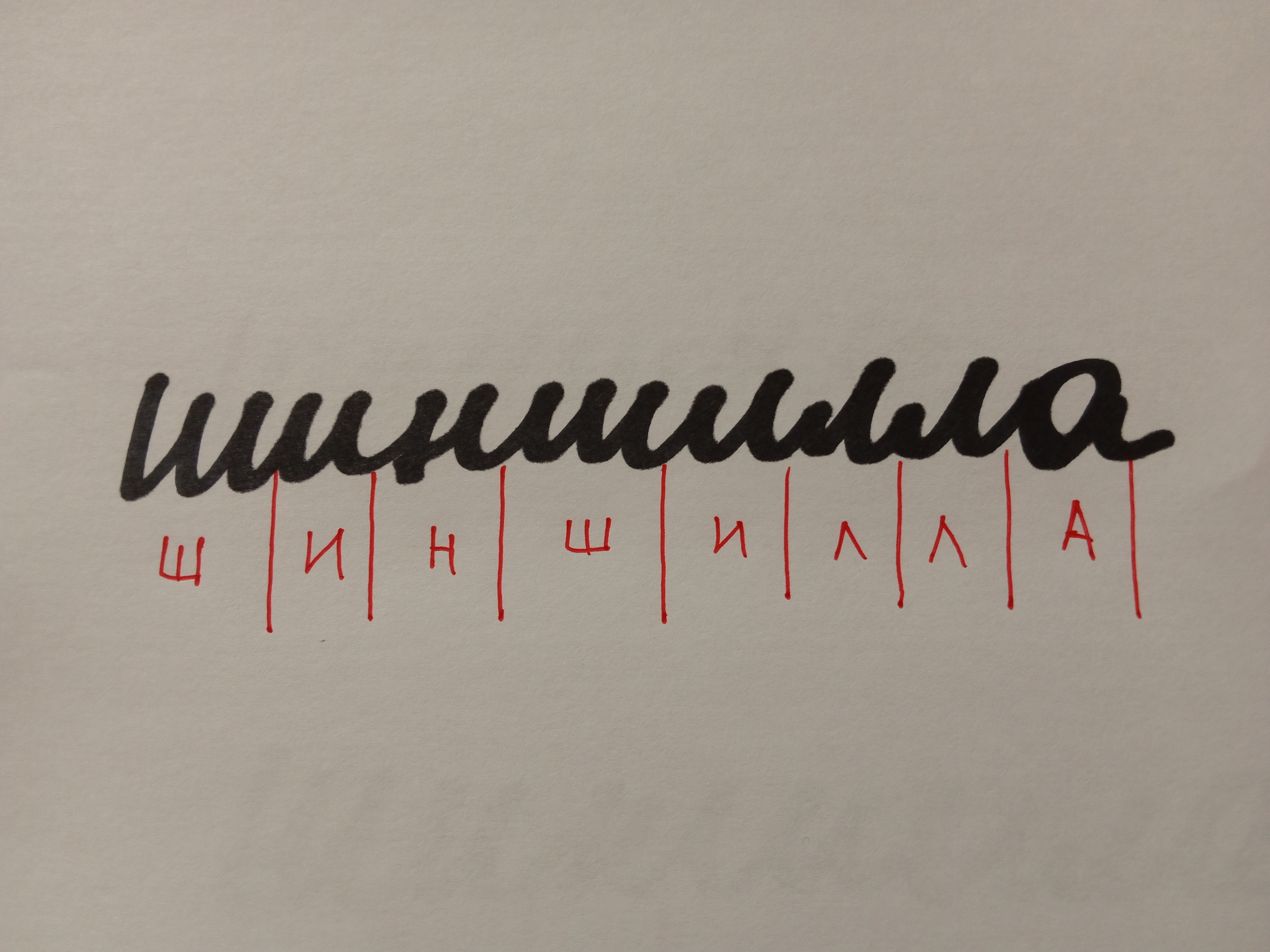
The word Шиншилла (shinshilla), which means "Chinchilla". In red, a decomposition of the handwritten text showing the block letter equivalent.

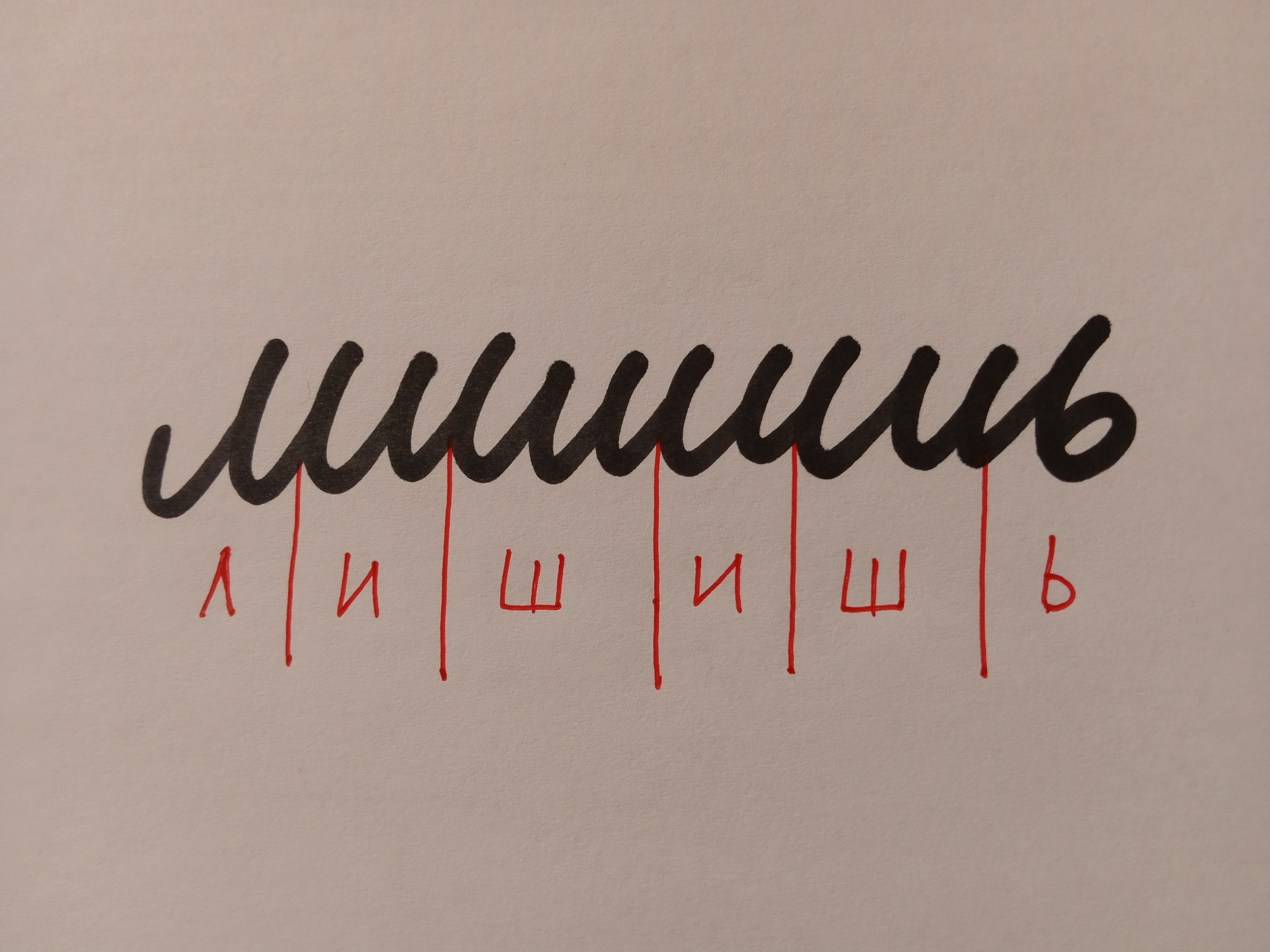
The word Лишишь (lishish), which means "you will deprive". In red, a decomposition of the handwritten text showing the block letter equivalent.

=== Variants, use of diacritics ===
A signature of Fyodor Dostoevsky showing a stylized macron above the ⟨т⟩ in "Достоевскій"

In some forms of cursive, the distinction between т and ш may become elusive because both are written in the shapes of either 𝑚 or ɯ. To alleviate this case of ambiguity, a horizontal bar can be written above the character (like m̅ or rarely ɯ̅) if it is т, or below (like ɯ̲ or rarely m̲) if it is ш. Also, writing т in its printed form (the T shape) rather than its usual 𝑚 shape is common.

The letter д may also be written in the shape of ꝺ or ∂. The letter х is sometimes written identical to block lowercase Latin x.

== Differences to Serbian and Macedonian cursives ==
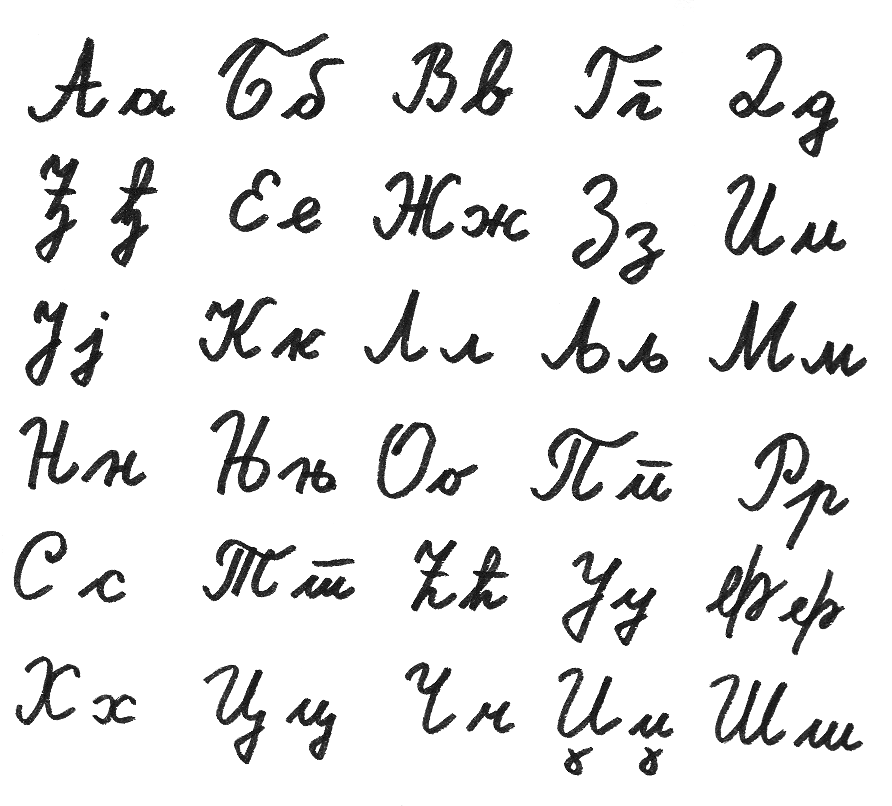
Serbian cyrillic alphabet written in cursive. Note how the outlines г̄, ū, ɯ̅, Ձ contrast to respective Russian г, 𝓃, 𝑚, Д.

Several letters in Russian cursive are different from the cursive used in the Serbian and Macedonian languages. Thus, Serbian/Macedonian cursive lowercase г looks the same as in Russian with additional macron, п is written like the cursive Latin u with macron (ū), and the letter т is written in the shape of ɯ̅. Serbian uppercase Д resembles the shape of Ձ. The letters б, д, з, Б, Н can also be written differently from their Russian counterparts.

== Charts ==
Modern Russian cursive

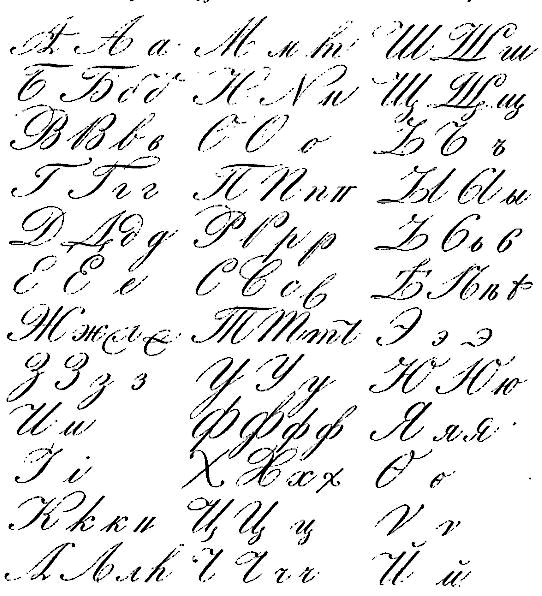
Varieties of Russian calligraphic cursive from an 1835 dictionary

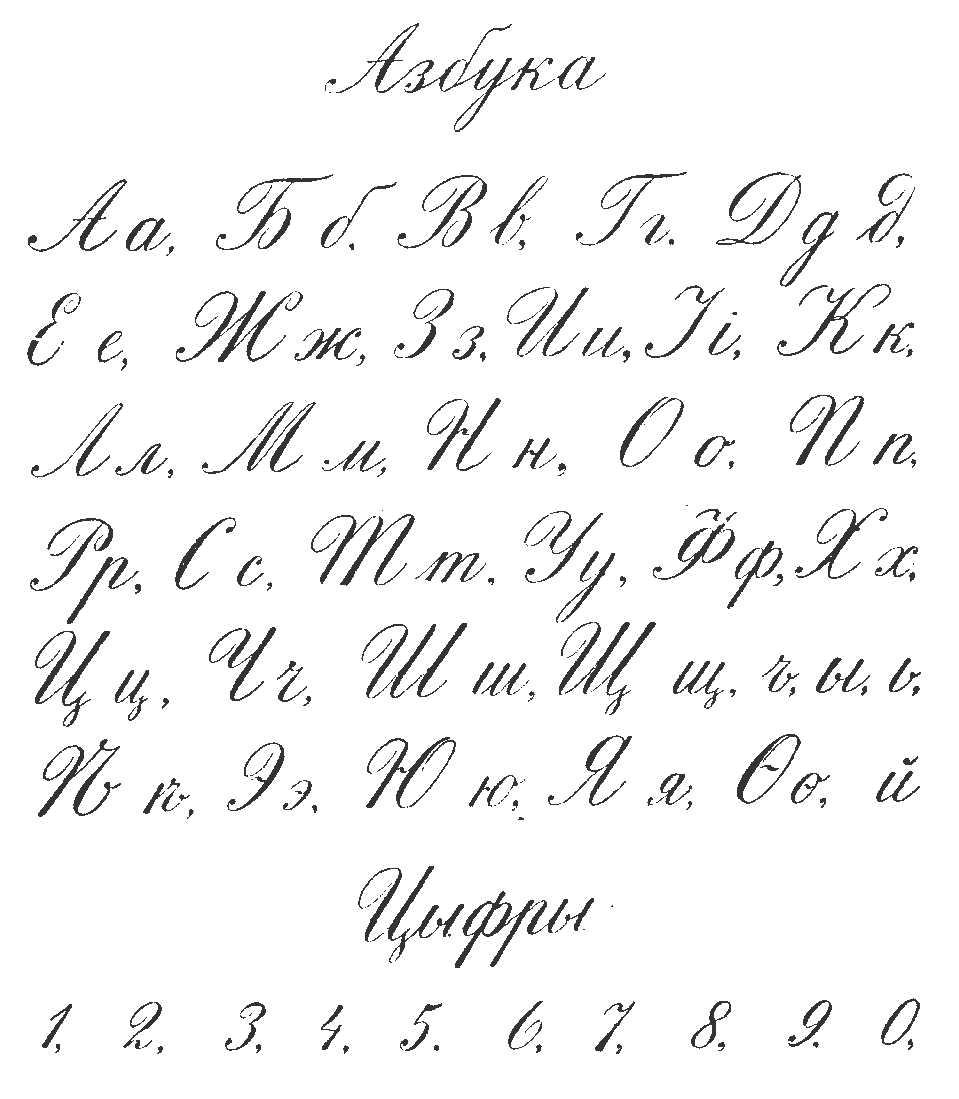
Pre-reform Russian calligraphic cursive from a 1916 schoolbook

== See also ==
- Cursive
- Skoropis′
- Russian alphabet
- Russian orthography
