= Transliteration =

Conversion of a text from one script to another

Transliteration is the attempt to represent the text of one language in the writing system of another. For instance, for the Greek term ⟨Ελληνική Δημοκρατία⟩, which is usually translated as 'Hellenic Republic', the usual transliteration into the Latin script (romanization) is ⟨Hellēnikḗ Dēmokratía⟩; and the Russian term ⟨Российская Республика⟩, which is usually translated as 'Russian Republic', can be transliterated either as ⟨Rossiyskaya Respublika⟩ or alternatively as ⟨Rossijskaja Respublika⟩.

Transliteration is the process of representing or intending to represent a word, phrase, or text in a different script or writing system. Transliterations are designed to convey the pronunciation of the original word in a different script, allowing readers or speakers of that script to approximate the sounds and pronunciation of the original word. Transliterations do not change the pronunciation of the word. Thus, in the Greek example above, ⟨λλ⟩ is transliterated as ⟨ll⟩, though it is pronounced exactly the same way as ⟨l⟩, i.e. [l]; likewise, ⟨Δ⟩ is transliterated as ⟨D⟩, though pronounced as [ð] rather than [d], and ⟨η⟩ is transliterated ⟨ē⟩, though pronounced as [i] (exactly like ⟨ι⟩) rather than [e] or [ɛ], and is not a long vowel.

Transcription, conversely, seeks to capture sound, but phonetically approximate it into the new script; ⟨Ελληνική Δημοκρατία⟩ corresponds to [eliniˈci ðimokraˈtia] in the International Phonetic Alphabet. Here, ⟨ή⟩ palatalizes the preceding ⟨κ⟩, and thus is represented in IPA with [c], the palatal allophone of /k/. Likewise, the tonos diacritic ⟨΄⟩ to denote stress of a syllable is transcribed as ⟨ˈ⟩ in IPA.

Angle brackets ⟨ ⟩ may be used to set off transliteration, as opposed to slashes / / for phonemic transcription and square brackets [ ] for phonetic transcription. Angle brackets may also be used to set off characters in the original script. Conventions and author preferences vary.

== Definitions ==
Systematic transliteration is a mapping from one system of writing into another, typically grapheme to grapheme. Most transliteration systems are one-to-one, so a reader who knows the system can reconstruct the original spelling.

Transliteration, which adapts written form in the source language, is opposed to transcription, which renders the spoken form of the source language and hence its pronunciation. Still, most systems of transliteration map the letters of the source script to letters pronounced similarly in the target script, for some specific pair of source and target language. Transliteration may be very close to transcription if the relations between letters and sounds are similar in both languages.

For many script pairs, there are one or more standard transliteration systems. However, unsystematic transliteration is common, as for Burmese, for instance.

== Difference from transcription ==
In Modern Greek, the letters ⟨η, ι, υ⟩ and the letter combinations ⟨ει, oι, υι⟩ are pronounced [i] (except when pronounced as semivowels), and a modern transcription renders them as ⟨i⟩. However, a transliteration distinguishes them; for example, by transliterating them as ⟨ē, i, y⟩ and ⟨ei, oi, yi⟩. (As the ancient pronunciation of ⟨η⟩ was [ɛː], it is often transliterated as ⟨ē⟩.) On the other hand, ⟨αυ, ευ, ηυ⟩ are pronounced /af, ef, if/, and are voiced to [av, ev, iv] when followed by a voiced consonant – a shift from Ancient Greek /au̯, eu̯, iu̯/. A transliteration would render them all as ⟨au, eu, iu⟩ no matter the environment these sounds are in, reflecting the traditional orthography of Ancient Greek, yet a transcription would distinguish them, based on their phonemic and allophonic pronunciations in Modern Greek. Furthermore, the initial letter ⟨h⟩ reflecting the historical rough breathing ⟨ ̔⟩ in words such as ⟨Hellēnikḗ⟩ would intuitively be omitted in transcription for Modern Greek, as Modern Greek no longer has the /h/ sound.

Greek word	Transliteration	Transcription	English translation
Ελληνική Δημοκρατία	Hellēnikḗ Dēmokratía	Elliniki Dimokratia	'Hellenic Republic'
ελευθερία	eleuthería	eleftheria	'freedom, liberty'
ευαγγέλιο	euangélio	evangelio	'gospel'
των υιών	tōn hyiṓn	ton ion	'of the sons'

== Challenges ==
A simple example of difficulties in transliteration is the Arabic letter qāf. It is pronounced, in literary Arabic, approximately like English [k], except that the tongue makes contact not on the soft palate but on the uvula, but the pronunciation varies among dialects of Arabic. The letter is sometimes transliterated into ⟨g⟩, sometimes into ⟨q⟩ or ⟨'⟩ (for in Egypt it is silent), and rarely even into ⟨k⟩ in English. Another example is the Russian letter ‹Х› (kha). It is pronounced as the voiceless velar fricative /x/, like the Scottish pronunciation of ⟨ch⟩ in "loch". This sound is not present in most forms of English and is often transliterated as ⟨kh⟩ as in ⟨Nikita Khrushchev⟩. Many languages have phonemic sounds, such as click consonants, which are quite unlike any phoneme in the language into which they are being transliterated.

Some languages and scripts present particular difficulties to transcribers. These are discussed on separate pages. Examples of languages and writing systems and methods of transliterating include:

- Ancient Near East
  - Transliterating cuneiform languages
  - Transliteration of Ancient Egyptian (see also Egyptian hieroglyphs)
  - Hieroglyphic Luwian
- Armenian language
  - Armenian alphabet
    - Romanization of Armenian
- Avestan
- Brahmic family
  - Bengali–Assamese script
    - Romanisation of Assamese
    - Romanisation of Bengali
  - Devanagari
    - Devanagari transliteration
  - Kannada script
  - Malayalam script
    - Romanization of Malayalam
  - Meitei script
  - Mon–Burmese script
    - Romanization of Burmese
  - Pali
  - Tamil script
  - Tibetan script
    - Wylie transliteration
    - Tibetan pinyin
    - Romanization of Dzongkha
  - Tocharian
- Celtic languages
- Chinese language
  - Bopomofo
  - Chinese characters
    - Transcription into Chinese characters
    - Romanization of Chinese
      - Pinyin (official)
    - Cyrillization of Chinese
- Click languages of Africa
  - Khoisan languages
  - Bantu languages
- English language
  - English alphabet
    - Hebraization of English
- French language
  - French alphabet
    - Cyrillization of French
- Georgian language
  - Georgian scripts
    - Romanization of Georgian
- Greek language
  - Linear B
  - Greek alphabet
    - Romanization of Greek
    - Greeklish
- Hmong language
  - Pahawh Hmong
  - Nyiakeng Puachue Hmong
- Japanese language
  - Japanese writing system
    - Romanization of Japanese
      - Hepburn romanization
    - Cyrillization of Japanese
- Khmer language
  - Khmer script
    - Romanization of Khmer
- Korean language
  - Hangul/Chosŏn'gŭl
    - Romanization of Korean
    - Cyrillization of Korean
- Mongolian language
  - Mongolian Cyrillic alphabet
  - Mongolian script
    - SASM/GNC romanization
- Northwest Caucasian languages
  - Abkhaz language
  - Circassian languages
    - Adyghe language
    - Kabardian language
- Pashto
  - Pashto alphabet
- Persian language
  - Persian alphabet
    - Romanization of Persian
    - Cyrillization of Persian
    - Persian chat alphabet
- Semitic languages
  - Amharic
    - Geʽez script
  - Arabic
    - Arabic alphabet
      - Romanization of Arabic
      - Arabic chat alphabet
  - Hebrew
    - Hebrew alphabet
      - Romanization of Hebrew
  - Ugaritic
    - Ugaritic alphabet
- Slavic languages written in the Cyrillic or Glagolitic alphabets
  - Romanization of Belarusian
  - Romanization of Bulgarian
  - Romanization of Russian
  - Romanization of Macedonian
  - Romanization of Serbian
  - Romanization of Ukrainian
- Tai languages
  - Lao language
    - Lao script
      - Romanization of Lao
  - Thai language
    - Thai script
      - Romanization of Thai
- Turkic language
  - Old Turkic
    - Old Turkic script
  - Azerbaijani language
    - Azerbaijani alphabets
  - Kazakh language
    - Kazakh alphabets
  - Kyrgyz language
    - Kyrgyz alphabets
  - Turkmen language
    - Turkmen alphabet
  - Uyghur language
    - Uyghur alphabets
  - Uzbek language
    - Uzbek alphabet
- Urdu language
  - Urdu alphabet (Nastaliq)
    - Romanization of Urdu

== Adopted ==
- Buckwalter transliteration
- Devanagari transliteration
- Hans Wehr transliteration
- International Alphabet of Sanskrit Transliteration
- Scientific transliteration of Cyrillic
- Transliteration of Ancient Egyptian
- Transliterations of Manchu
- Wylie transliteration

== See also ==
- Cyrillization
- International Components for Unicode
- ISO 15924
- Latin script
- List of ISO transliterations
- Orthographic transcription
- Phonemic orthography
- Phonetic transcription
- Romanization
- Spread of the Latin script
- Substitution cipher
- Transcription (linguistics)
