= Cyrillization =

Transcription of languages into Cyrillic script

The Cyrillic letter Dwe, an example of Cyrillization that takes into an account the native phonetics (Abkhaz)

Cyrillization or Cyrillisation is the process of rendering words of a language that normally uses a writing system other than Cyrillic script into (a version of) the Cyrillic alphabet. Although such a process has often been carried out in an ad hoc fashion, the term cyrillization usually refers to a consistent system applied, for example, to transcribe names of German, Chinese, or English people and places for use in Russian, Ukrainian, Serbian, Macedonian or Bulgarian newspapers and books. Cyrillization is analogous to romanization, when words from a non-Latin script-using language are rendered in the Latin alphabet for use (e.g., in English, German, or Francophone literature.)

Just as with various Romanization schemes, each Cyrillization system has its own set of rules, depending on:

- The source language or writing system (English, French, Arabic, Hindi, Kazakh in Latin alphabet, Chinese, Japanese, etc.),
- The destination language or writing system (Russian, Ukrainian, Bulgarian, Kazakh in Cyrillic, etc.),
- the goals of the systems:
  - to render occasional foreign words (mostly personal and place names) for use in newspapers or on maps;
  - to provide a practical approximate phonetic transcription in a phrasebook or a bilingual dictionary;
  - or to convert a language to a Cyrillic writing system altogether (e.g., Dungan, Kazakh)
- Linguistic and/or political inclinations of the designers of the system (see, for example, the use—or disuse—of the letter Ґ for rendering the "G" of foreign words in Ukrainian).

When the source language uses a fairly phonetic spelling system (e.g., Spanish, Turkish), a Cyrillization scheme may often be adopted that almost amounts to a transliteration, i.e., using a mapping scheme that simply maps each letter of the source alphabet to some letter of the destination alphabet, sometimes augmented by position-based rules. There a number of schemes:

- Cyrillization of Arabic
- Cyrillization of Chinese
- Cyrillization of English
- Cyrillization of Esperanto
- Cyrillization of French
- Cyrillization of German
- Cyrillization of Greek
- Cyrillization of Hebrew
- Cyrillization of Hindi
- Cyrillization of Italian
- Cyrillization of Japanese - e.g. Polivanov system
- Cyrillization of Korean
- Cyrillization of Manchu
- Cyrillization of Polish
- Cyrillization of Portuguese
- Cyrillization of Spanish

Similarly, simple schemes are widely used to render words from Latin-script languages into Cyrillic-script languages.

When the source language does not use a particularly phonetic writing system—most notably English and French—its words are typically rendered in Russian, Ukrainian, or other Cyrillic-based languages using an approximate phonetic transcription system, which aims to allow the Cyrillic readers to approximate the sound of the source language as much as it is possible within the constraints of the destination language and its orthography. Among the examples are the Practical transcription of English into Russian (Russian: Правила англо-русской практической транскрипции), which aims to render English words into Russian based on their sounds, and Transliteration of foreign words by a Cyrillic alphabet (uk:Транслітерація іншомовних слів кирилицею) and Cyrillization of the English language (uk:Кирилізація англійської мови) in the case of Ukrainian. While this scheme is mostly accepted by a majority of Russian and Ukrainian authors and publishers, transcription variants are not uncommon.

A transliteration system for the Bulgarian Cyrillization of English has been designed by the Bulgarian linguist Andrey Danchev.

Similarly, phonetic schemes are widely adopted for Cyrillization of French, especially considering the fairly large number of French loanwords that have been borrowed into Russian.

== See also ==
- Cyrillisation in the Soviet Union
