= Aspirated h =

Linguistic phenomenon in French

In French spelling, aspirated "h" (French: h aspiré) is an initial silent letter that represents a hiatus at a word boundary, between the word's first vowel and the preceding word's last vowel. At the same time, the aspirated h stops the normal processes of contraction and liaison from occurring.

The name of the now-silent h refers not to a contemporary aspiration but to its former pronunciation as the voiceless glottal fricative [h] in Old French and in Middle French.

== Examples ==
1. nos héros /no.e.ʁo/ our heroes
2. *nos héros /no.ze.ʁo/ our heroes

This example illustrates how the aspirated h-word héros prevents the liaison, in which the otherwise-silent word-final consonant would be pronounced before the first vowel of the following word. Because the h is an aspirated h, the second entry is incorrect, as the hiatus prevents the final /z/ from being phonetically realised. The pronunciation /no.ze.ʁo/ would be understood as meaning nos zéros (our zeroes), something totally different.

1. le hibou /lə.i.bu/ the owl
2. *l'hibou /li.bu/ the owl

This example illustrates how the aspirated-h word hibou has no elision, in which the vowel of the le would be dropped. The second entry is incorrect because elision is not allowed in the word hibou because of the hiatus imposed by its aspirated h.

== Historical and sociolinguistic aspects ==
One part of the major phonological changes between Latin and Early Old French was the loss of the consonant /h/, which would later return with the introduction of Germanic words into the language. The aspirate h ceased to be pronounced once more in either the 16th or the 17th century, but some grammarians kept insisting for it be pronounced into the early part of the twentieth century. Since the phonological behavior of aspirate h words cannot be predicted through spelling, usage requires a considerable amount of memorisation. It is often used to demonstrate one's education and social status. As early as the 17th century, noted grammarian Claude Favre de Vaugelas described the incorrect pronunciation of aspirated h words as typical of French spoken on the southern side of the Loire. Further discussion of the phenomenon is found in almost every collection of remarks on language to the present day, with mistakes generally being ascribed to class differences or inattention.

In modern usage, the blocking of liaison and elision with aspirated h words appears to be gaining ground in formal French but is losing ground in less guarded speech.

== List of French words which begin with an aspirated h ==
The following list contains only the dictionary head entries and not all the forms that can be derived from them. For example, it does not contain past participles or transitive verbs when used as adjectives or nouns. It does not include composite words unless the omission might cause confusion among homonyms distinguished only by diacritic signs.

- In all French words that begin with h, the following letter is a vowel.
- Most aspirated-h words are derived from Germanic languages.
- The h is generally not aspirated in words of Latin and Greek origin.
- The h is aspirated in onomatopoeia.
- There are numerous exceptions, and etymology often cannot explain them satisfactorily.

In French dictionaries, words with an initial aspirated h are traditionally prefixed with an asterisk but with no effect on their alphabetical arrangement. The following list is compiled from the Dictionnaire du Trésor de la langue française and the Dictionnaire de l'Académie française. It lacks many proper names and recent borrowings. In general, if a borrowed word is pronounced with an [h] in its language of origin, the h will be conserved in French orthography and be aspirated.

=== Words beginning with ha ===
- habanera (n. f.)
- hâbler (v. tr. ou intr.)
- hâblerie (n. f.)
- hâbleur, -euse (adj. ou n. m./f.)
- hache (n. f.)
- hache-écorce (n. m. sing.)
- hache-écorces (n. m. pl.)
- hache-fourrage (n. m. invar.)
- hache-légumes (n. m. invar.)
- hache-maïs (n. m. invar.)
- hache-paille (n. m. invar.)
- hacher (v. tr.)
- hachereau, -eaux (n. m. sing./pl.)
- hache-sarment (n. m. sing. or pl.)
- hache-sarments (n. m. pl.)
- hachette (n. f.)
- hache-viande (n. m. invar.)
- hachage (n. m.)
- hacheur, -euse (adj. or n. m./f.)
- hachis (n. m.)
- hachich (n. m.)
- hachisch (n. m.)
- hachoir (n. m.)
- hachure (n. f.)
- hack (n. m. anglicisme)
- hacquebute ou haquebute (n. f.)
- hacquebutier ou haquebutier (n. m.)
- hadal, -aux (adj. sing./pl.)
- haddock (n. m.)
- hadîth (n. m.)
- hadj (n. m.)
- hadji (n. m.)
- haguais (adj.)
- Haguais, -aise (n. m./f.)
- Hague, la (n. propre f.)
- hagard (adj.)
- ha ! ha ! (interj.)
- haha (n. m.)
- hahé ! (interj. or n. m.)
- haie (n. f.)
- haïe (part. pass. de haïr)
- haïk (n. m.)
- haillon (n. m.)
- haillonneux, -euse (adj. or n. m./f.)
- haine (n. f.)
- haineux, -euse (adj. m./f.)
- haineusement (adv.)
- haïr (v. tr.)
- haïssable (adj.)
- halage (n. m.)
- halbran (n. m.)
- hâle (n. m.)
- halecret (n. m.)
- haler (v. tr.)
- hâler (v. intr.)
- haleter (v. intr.)
- halètement (n. m.)
- hall (n. m.)
- halle (n. f.)
- hallebarde (n. f.)
- hallebardier (n. m.)
- hallier (n. m.)
- hallstatien, -ienne (adj. m./f.)
- halo (n. m.)
- haloir or hâloir (n. m.)
- halophile (adj. or n. m.)
- halot (n. m.)
- halte (n. f.)
- hamac (n. m.)
- hamada (n. f.)
- hamal or hammal (n. m.)
- Hambourg (n. propre m.)
- hamburger (n. m.)
- hameau, -eaux (n. m. sing./pl.)
- hammal or hamal (n. m.)
- hammam (n. m.)
- hammerless (n. m.)
- hampe (n. f.)
- hamster (n. m.)
- han ! (interj. or n. m.)
- hanap (n. m.)
- hanche (n. f.)
- hanchement (n. m.)
- hancher (v. tr. or intr. or pr.)
- hand (n. m., abrév.)
- handball or hand-ball (n. m.)
- handballeur, -euse (n. m./f.)
- handicap (n. m.)
- handicaper (v. tr.)
- hangar (n. m.)
- hanneton (n. m.)
- hannetonner (v. tr. or intr.)
- hanse (n. f.)
- hanséatique (adj.)
- hanter (v. tr.)
- hantise (n. f.)
- happe (n. f.)
- happelourde (n. f.)
- happer (v. tr.)
- happening (n. m. anglicisme)
- happement (n. m.)
- happy-end or happy end (n. m. anglicisme)
- haquebute or hacquebute (n. f.)
- haquebutier or hacquebutier (n. m.)
- haquenée (n. f.)
- haquet (n. m.)
- hara-kiri (n. m.)
- harangue (n. f.)
- haranguer (v. tr.)
- harangueur, -euse (n. m./f.)
- haras (n. m.)
- harassant (adj.)
- harasser (v. tr.)
- harassement (n. m.)
- harceler (v. tr.)
- harcèlement (n. m.)
- harceleur, -euse (n. or adj. m./f.)
- hachich (n. m.)
- harde (n. f.)
- harder (v. tr.)
- hardes (n. f. pl.)
- hardi (adj.)
- hardiesse (n. f.)
- hardiment (adv.)
- hardware (n. m. anglicisme)
- harem (n. m.)
- hareng (n. m.)
- harengère (n. f.)
- haret (adj. m.)
- harfang (n. m.)
- hargne (n. f.)
- hargneux, -euse (adj. m./f.)
- hargneusement (adv.)
- haricot (n. m.)
- haricoter (v. tr.)
- haridelle (n. f.)
- harissa (n. f.)
- harka (n. f.)
- harki (n. m.)
- harle (n. m.)
- harlou ! (interj. n. m.)
- harnacher (v. tr.)
- harnacheur, -euse (n. or adj. m./f.)
- harnachement (n. m.)
- harnais (n. m.)
- harnois (n. m. vieux)
- haro ! (interj. or n. m.)
- harpailler, se (v. pronom.)
- harpe (n. f.)
- harper (v. tr. or intrans.)
- harpie (n. f.)
- harpiste (n. m. or f.)
- harpon (n. m.)
- harponner (v. tr.)
- harponneur, -euse (n. or adj. m./f.)
- harponnage (n. m.)
- hart (n. f. vieux)
- hasard (n. m.)
- hasarder (v. tr. or pr.)
- hasardeux, -euse (adj. m./f.)
- hasardeusement (adv.)
- haschich (n. m.)
- hase (n. f.)
- hast (n. m. vieil.)
- hastaire (n. m.)
- haste (n. f.)
- hâte (n. f.)
- hâtelet (n. m.)
- hâtelette (n. f.)
- hâter (v. tr. or pr.)
- hâtier (n. m.)
- hâtif, -ive (adj. m./f.)
- hâtiveau (n. m.)
- hâtivement (adv.)
- hauban (n. m.)
- haubanner (v. tr.)
- haubanneur, -euse (n. or adj. m./f.)
- haubergeon (n. m.)
- haubert (n. m.)
- hausse (n. f.)
- hausse-col (n. m.)
- haussement (n. m.)
- hausse-pied (n. m.)
- hausser (v. tr.)
- hausseur, -euse (n. or adj. m./f.)
- hausseusement (adv.)
- haussier (n. m.)
- haussier, -ière (adj. m./f.)
- haut (adj.)
- hautain (n. m.)
- hautain, -aine (adj.)
- hautbois (n. m.)
- haut-de-chausses (n. m. sing.)
- haut-de-forme (n. m. sing.)
- haute-contre (n. m./f. sing.)
- haute-forme (n. m. sing.)
- hautement (adv.)
- hautesse (n. f.)
- hauteur (n. f.)
- hautes-contre (n. m./f. pl.)
- hautes-formes (n. m. pl.)
- haut-fond (n. m. sing.)
- hautin (n. m.)
- haut-le-cœur (n. m. invar.)
- haut-le-corps (n. m. invar.)
- haut-le-pied (n. m. or adj. or adv. invar.)
- haut-parleur (n. m. sing.)
- haut-parleurs (n. m. pl.)
- haut-relief (n. m. sing.)
- hauts-de-chausses (n. m. pl.)
- hauts-de-forme (n. m. pl.)
- hauts-fonds (n. m. pl.)
- hauts-reliefs (n. m. pl.)
- hauturier, -ière (adj. m./f.)
- havage (n. m.)
- havanais (adj.)
- Havanais, -aise (n. m./f.)
- havane (n. m.)
- Havane, la (n. propre f.)
- hâve (n. m.)
- haveneau (n. m.)
- havenet (n. m.)
- haver (v.tr.)
- haveur, -euse (n. m./f.)
- havir (v. tr. or pronom.)
- havrais (adj.)
- Havrais, -aise (n. m./f.)
- havre (n. m.)
- Havre, le (n. propre m.)
- havresac or havre-sac (n. m. sing.)
- havresacs or havre-sacs (n. m. pl.)
- hayon (n. m.)
- Hayden (n. propre m.)

=== Words beginning with he ===
- hé ! (interj. or n. m.)
- heaume (n. m.)
- heaumier (n. m.)
- hé bien! (interj. or n. m.)
- heimatlos (adj. et n. invar.)
- hein ? (interj. or n. m.)
- hélas ! (interj. or loc. adv.)¹
- héler (v. tr.)
- héleur, -euse (n. or adj. m./f.)
- hèlement (n. m.)
- hello : (interj. or n. m.)
- hem ! or hum ! (interj. or n. m.)
- hemloc or hemlock (n. m.)
- henné (n. m.)
- hennir (v. intr.)
- hennissant (adj.)
- hennissement (n. m.)
- hennisseur, -euse (n. or adj. m./f.)
- Henri, -iette (n. propre m./f.)
- henry (n. m.)
- Henry (n. propre m.)
- hentai or hentaï (n. m. anglicisme)
- hep ! (interj. or n. m.)
- héraut (n. m.)
- herchage or herschage (n. m.)
- hercher or herscher (v. tr.)
- hercheur, -euse or herscheur, -euse (n. m./f.)
- hère (n. m.)
- hérissement (n. m.)
- hérisser (v. tr.)
- hérisseur, -euse (adj. or n. m./f.)
- hérisson (n. m.)
- hérissonner (v. tr.)
- hermitique (adj.)
- herniaire (adj. or n. f.)
- hernie (n. f.)
- hernieux, -euse (adj. m./f.)
- héron (n. m.)
- héronnier, -ière (adj. m./f.)
- héros (n. m.)
- herschage or herchage (n. m.)
- herscher or hercher (v. tr.)
- herscheur, -euse or hercheur, -euse (n. m./f.)
- herse (n. f.)
- herser (v. tr.)
- hertz (n. m. invar.)
- hertzien, -ienne (adj. m./f.)
- hêtraie (n. f.)
- hêtre (n. m.)
- heu.../heux (interj. or n. m. sing./pl.)
- heulandite (n. f.)
- heurt (n. m.)
- heurtement (n. m.)
- heurtequin (n. m.)
- heurter (v. tr. or pr.)
- heurteur, -euse (n. or adj. m./f.)
- heurtoir (n. m.)

==== Hélas ====
Hélas is not aspirated in classical poetry.

- Hélas ! Que cet hélas a de peine à sortir (Pierre Corneille).

That is indicated here by the use of cet rather than ce.

=== Words beginning with hi ===
The aspiration of h is often optional in words beginning with hi, and the liaison (with a mute h) is generally accepted, except in recent anglicisms of current usage, interjections or homophones with another word. Beside the very productive and learned Greek root hiéro-, most words are quite recent and of Germanic origin (German, Dutch, Modern English), or the h is lightly pronounced.

- hi ! (interj. ou n. m.)
- hiatal, -aux (adj. sing./pl.)
- hiatus (n. m. invar.)
- hibou, -oux (n. m. sing./pl.)
- hic ! (interj. ou n. m.)
- hic et nunc (loc. adv.)
- hickory, -ies (n. m. sing./pl.)
- hidalgo (n. m.)
- hideur (n. f.)
- hideusement (adv.)
- hideux, -euse (adj. m./f.)
- hie (n. f.)
- hiement (n. m.)
- hier (v. intr.)
- hiéracocéphale (adj.)
- hiérarchie (n. f.)
- hiérarchique (adj.)
- hiérarchiquement (adv.)
- hiérarchiser (v. tr.)
- hiérarchisation (n. f.)
- hiératique (adj.)
- hiératiquement (adv.)
- hiératisant (adj.)
- hiératisé (adj.)
- hiératisme (n. m.)
- hiérochromie (n. f.)
- hiérocrate (n. m.)
- hiérocratisme (n. m.)
- hiérodrame (n. m.)
- hiérogamie (n. f.)
- hiérogamique (adj.)
- hiéroglyphe (n. m.)
- hiéroglyphé (adj.)
- hiéroglyphie (n. f.)
- hiéroglyphié (adj.)
- hiéroglyphique (adj.)
- hiéroglyphiquement (adv.)
- hiéroglyphisme (n. m.)
- hiéroglyphite (n. m.)
- hiérogramme (n. m.)
- hiérogrammate (n. m.)
- hiérogrammatisme (n. m.)
- hiérographe (n. m.)
- hiéromancie (n. f.)
- hiéromoine (n. m.)
- hiérophanie (n. f.)
- hiéroscopie (n. f.)
- hiéroscopique (adj.)
- hi-fi (loc. adj. abbrév. invar.)
- highlandais, -aise (adj. m./f.)
- Highlander (n. m.)
- Highlands (n. propre m. pl.)
- high-life (n. m. anglicisme)
- highlifer (v. intr. anglicisme)
- highlifeur (n. m. anglicisme)
- hi-han ! ou hi han ! (interj. ou n. m.)
- hilaire (adj.)
- Hilaire (n. propre m.)
- hile (n. m.)
- Hilbert (n. propre m.)
- Hildegarde (n. propre f.)
- hindi ou hindî (adj. ou n. m.)
- hip hip hip ! (interj.)
- hip-hop (n. m. ou adj. invar.)
- hippie ou hippy, -ies (n. m. ou f. ou adj. sing./pl. anglicisme)
- hissage (n. m.)
- hisser (v. tr. ou pr.)
- hissement (n. m.)
- hisseur, -euse (n. ou adj. m./f.)
- hit (n. m., anglicisme)
- hit-parade (n. m. sing., anglicisme)
- hit-parades (n. m. pl., anglicisme)
- hittite (adj. ou n. m.)
- Hittite (n. m./f.)

=== Words beginning with ho ===
Most have an aspirated h. The exceptions are mostly Latin roots that are most widely used in which the h has lost its voicing through assimilation to common language (in hôte, hospice or hôpital all derived from hospes/hospitis. Also if the h has been assimilated to the following ⟨s⟩ heure/horo-, taken from hora in which the h has been assimilated to the preceding adjectives, make the h mute.

- ho ! (interj. ou n. m.)
- Hobart (n. propre m.)
- hobby, -ies (n. m. sing./pl.)
- hobereau, -eaux (n. m. sing./pl.)
- hobereautaille (n. f.)
- hoberelle (n. f.)
- hoc (n. m.)
- hoca (n. m.)
- hocco ou hocko (n. m.)
- hoche (n. f.)
- hochement (n. m.)
- hochepot (n. m.)
- hochequeue ou hoche-queue (n. m. sing.)
- hochequeues ou hoche-queues (n. m. pl.)
- hocher (v. tr.)
- hochet (n. m.)
- hockey (n. m.)
- hockeyeur, -euse (n. m./f.)
- hocko ou hocco (n. m.)
- hodja (n. m.)
- hoffmannesque (adj.)
- hoffmannien, -ienne (adj. m./f.)
- hognement (n. m.)
- hogner (v. intr.)
- holà ! (interj. ou n. m. ou n. f. invar.)
- holding (n. f.)
- hôler (v. intr.)
- hold-up (n. m.)
- hollandais (adj.)
- Hollandais, -aise (n. m./f.)
- hollandaisement (adv.)
- hollande (n. m. ou f.)
- Hollande, la (n. propre f.)
- hollandé (adj.)
- hollandiser (v. tr.)
- hollando-belge (adj.)
- hollando-français, -aise (adj. m./f.)
- hollando-norvégien, -ienne (adj. m./f.)
- hollando-saxon, -onne (adj. m./f.)
- Hollywood (n. propre m.)
- hollywoodesque (adj.)
- hollywoodien, -ienne (adj.)
- homard (n. m.)
- homarderie (n. f.)
- homardier (n. m.)
- home (n. m. anglicisme)
- homespun (n. m. angl.)
- hon ! (interj. ou n. m.)
- Honduras, le (n. propre m.)
- hondurien (adj.)
- Hondurien, -ienne (n. m./f.)
- hongre (n. m.)
- hongreline (n. f.)
- hongrer (v. tr.)
- hongreur, -euse (n. m./f.)
- Hongrie, la (n. propre f.)
- hongrois (adj. ou n. m.)
- Hongrois, -se (n. m./f.)
- hongroyage (n. m.)
- hongroyer (v. tr.)
- hongroyeur, -euse (n. m./f.)
- honnir (v. tr.)
- honnissement (n. m.)
- honte (n. f.)
- honteux, -euse (adj. m./f.)
- honteusement (adv.)
- hop ! (interj.)
- hoquet (n. m.)
- hoqueter (v. intr. ou tr.)
- hoquètement (n. m.)
- hoqueton (n. m.)
- horde (n. f.)
- horion (n. m.)
- hormis (prép.)
- hornblende (n. f.)
- hors (prép. ou adv.)
- horsain (n. m.)
- hors-bord (loc. adj. ou n. m. sing.)
- hors-bords (n. m. pl.)
- hors-caste (n. m. sing.)
- hors-castes (n. m. pl.)
- hors-d'œuvre ou hors d'œuvre (n. m. invar.)
- horseguard ou horse-guard (n. m. sing.)
- horseguards ou horse-guards (n. m. pl.)
- horse-pox (n. m. invar.)
- hors-jeu (n. m. invar.)
- hors-la-loi (n. invar.)
- hors-série (n. m. ou adj. invar.)
- horst (n. m. invar.)
- hors-texte (n. m. invar.)
- hosanna, -as ou hosannah, -hs (n. m.)
- hosannière (adj. f.)
- hotdog ou hot-dog (n. m. sing.)
- hotdogs ou hot-dogs (n. m. pl.)
- hotte (n. f.)
- hottée (n. f.)
- hotter (v. tr.)
- hottentot, -ote (adj. ou n. m./f.)
- hotteur, -euse (n. m./f.)
- hou ! (interj. ou n. m.)
- houp ! (interj. ou n. m.)
- houblon (n. m.)
- houblonner (v. tr.)
- houblonneur, -euse (n. m./f.)
- houblonnière (n. f.)
- houdan (n. f.)
- Houdan (n. propre m.)
- houe (n. f.)
- houhou (n. m.)
- houille (n. f.)
- houiller, -ère (adj. m./f.)
- houillère (n. f.)
- houilleux, -euse (adj. m./f.)
- houka (n. m.)
- houle (n. f.)
- houler (v. intr.)
- houlette (n. f.)
- houleux, -euse (adj. m./f.)
- houleusement (adv.)
- houlier (n. m.)
- houlque ou ouque (n. f.)
- houp ! (interj. ou n. m.)
- houppe (n. f.)
- houppelande (n. f.)
- houppette (n. f.)
- houppier (n. m.)
- houque ou oulque (n. f.)
- houraillis (n. m. invar.)
- hourd (n. m.)
- hourdage (n. m.)
- hourder (v. tr.)
- hourdi, -is (n. m. sing./pl.)
- hourdis (n. m. invar.)
- houret (n. m.)
- houri (n. f.)
- hourque (n. f.)
- hourra ! ouhurra ! (interj. ou n. m.)
- hourvari (n. m.)
- houseau, -eaux (n. m. sing./pl.)
- houspiller (v. tr.)
- houspilleur, -euse (adj. ou n. m./f.)
- houspillement (n. m.)
- houssage (n. m.)
- houssaie (n. f.)
- housse (n. f.)
- housser (v. tr.)
- houssine (n. f.)
- houssoir (n. m.)
- Houston (n. propre f.)
- houx (n. m. invar.)
- hoyau, -aux (n. m. sing./pl.)

=== Words beginning with hu ===
Almost all words beginning with hu have an aspirated h. The exceptions are some terms for which the h is not etymological but was introduced for orthographic reasons with the purpose of distinguishing different roots that begin with a u or a v but were homographs in Latin writing (therefore, huile, huis, or huître are not aspirated).

- huard (n. m.)
- hublot (n. m.)
- huche (n. f.)
- huchée (n. f.)
- hucher (v. tr. ou pr.)
- huchet (n. m.)
- huchier (n. m.)
- hue ! (interj. ou n. m.)
- huée (n. f.)
- huer (v. tr. ou pr.)
- huerta, -as (n. f.)
- huehau ! (interj. ou n. m.)
- Hugo (n. propre m.)
- hugolâtre (adj.)
- hugolâtrie (n. f.)
- hugolien, -ienne (adj. m./f.)
- hugotique (adj.)
- hugotisme (n. m.)
- Hugues, -ette (n. propre m./f.)
- huguenot, -ote (n. ou adj. m./f.)
- huis-clos ou huis clos (n. m. invar.)
- huit (adj. ou n. invar.)
- huitain (n. m.)
- huitaine (n. f.)
- huitante (n. f.)
- huitième (adj. ou n. m. ou f.)
- Hulk, -ette (n. propre m./f.)
- hulotte (n. f.)
- hululation (v. tr.)
- hululer (v. tr.)
- hum ! (interj. ou n.m.)
- humage (n. m.)
- humement (n. m.)
- humer (v. tr.)
- humeux, -euse (adj. m./f.)
- humoter (v. tr.)
- hune (n. f.)
- hunier (n. m.)
- hunter (n. m. anglicisme)
- huppe (n. f.)
- huppé (adj.)
- huque (n. f.)
- hure (n. f.)
- hurlade (n. f.)
- hurlée (n. f.)
- hurlement (n. m.)
- hurler (v. tr.)
- hurleur, -euse (adj. m./f.)
- huro-iroquois, -oise (adj. m./f.)
- Huro-iroquois, -oise (n. m./f.)
- huron, -onne (adj. m./f.)
- Huron, -onne (n. m./f.)
- Huronien (n. m.)
- huronien, -ienne (adj. m./f.)
- hurricane (n. m.)
- husky, -ies' (n. m.)
- hussard (n. m. ou adj.)
- hussite (n. m.)
- hussitisme (n. m.)
- hutin (n. ou adj. m.)
- hutinet (n. m.)
- hutte (n. f.)
- hutteau (n. m.)
- hutter (v. tr.)
- huttier (n. m.)

== See also ==
- Hiatus (linguistics)
- Sandhi
