= Buer =

Buer may refer to:

== People ==
- Gary Buer (born 1946), an American football coach
- Karsten Buer (1913–1993), a Norwegian harness coach

== Other uses ==
- Buer (demon), a spirit that appears in the 16th-century Pseudomonarchia Daemonum
  - Buer, a devil in Dungeons & Dragons
- Buer, one of the names of Nahida, a character in 2020 video game Genshin Impact
- Clotho Buer, a fictional character in the anime Gundam SEED
- Buer, Germany, a suburb of Gelsenkirchen
- Buer, a municipality of Melle, Germany
- Buer stasjon, a weather station near Halden, Norway

== See also ==
- Beur (disambiguation)
- Butter (French: beurre)
