= Koopmann =

Koopmann is a surname. Notable people with the surname include:

- Erwin Koopmann, recipient of Knight's Cross of the Iron Cross
- Jörg Koopmann (born 1968), German photographer
- Karl Koopmann or Karl Koppmann (died 1905), German historian, archivist, authority on the Hanseatic League
- Pascal Koopmann (born 1990), German footballer

== See also ==
- Koopman
