= Russian alphabet =

Modern writing system of 33 letters

Russian Cyrillic alphabet Русская кириллическая азбука
- Script type: Alphabet
- Languages: Russian modern orthography: 1918 to present

Related scripts
- Parent systems: Egyptian hieroglyphs: Phoenician alphabet; Greek alphabet (partly Glagolitic alphabet); Early Cyrillic alphabet; Russian Cyrillic alphabet

ISO 15924
- ISO 15924: Cyrl (220), Cyrillic

Unicode
- Unicode alias: Cyrillic
- Unicode range: subset of Cyrillic (U+0400...U+04FF)

The Russian alphabet (Note: Russian: русский алфавит, romanized: russkij alfavit, IPA: [ˈruskʲɪj ɐlfɐˈvʲit]; more traditionally also русская азбука, russkaja azbuka, IPA: [ˈruskəjə ˈazbʊkə]) is the writing system used to write the Russian language.

The modern Russian alphabet consists of 33 letters: twenty consonants (⟨б⟩, ⟨в⟩, ⟨г⟩, ⟨д⟩, ⟨ж⟩, ⟨з⟩, ⟨к⟩, ⟨л⟩, ⟨м⟩, ⟨н⟩, ⟨п⟩, ⟨р⟩, ⟨с⟩, ⟨т⟩, ⟨ф⟩, ⟨х⟩, ⟨ц⟩, ⟨ч⟩, ⟨ш⟩, ⟨щ⟩), ten vowels (⟨а⟩, ⟨е⟩, ⟨ё⟩, ⟨и⟩, ⟨о⟩, ⟨у⟩, ⟨ы⟩, ⟨э⟩, ⟨ю⟩, ⟨я⟩), a semivowel / consonant (⟨й⟩), and two modifier letters or "signs" (⟨ъ⟩, ⟨ь⟩) that alter pronunciation of a preceding consonant or a following vowel.

Russian alphabet
Listen to the Russian alphabet

== History ==
Old Church Slavonic emerged as a standard language in the 9th century as a result of the efforts of Cyril and Methodius; it was the first Slavic literary language. A new script, later known as Glagolitic, was based on Greek cursive but included new letters for vowels that did not exist in Greek. This script was soon replaced by Cyrillic in the 10th century, likely developed by the disciples of Cyril and Methodius and likewise based on the Greek alphabet. The earliest evidence of Russian writing culture comes from birch-bark manuscripts dating to the 11th–15th centuries and written by laypeople.

The early Cyrillic alphabet had 44 letters, many of which were used for numerals. The alphabet was adapted to Russian from Old Church Slavonic, but over time it came to contain several redundant and superfluous letters as a result of phonological changes in Russian, including the loss of yers. Peter the Great made the first attempt to reform Russian orthography in 1708–1710. The last major reform took place in 1917–1918.

== Letters ==
Letter	Cursive	Italics	Name	Old Church Slavonic word-name	IPA	Common transliteration	Approximate English equivalent	Examples	No.	Unicode (Hex)
Аа		А а	а [a] ah	азъ [ɑs]	[a], [ɐ]	a	father	два dva "two"	1	U+0410 / U+0430
Бб		Б б	бэ [bɛ] be/beh	буки [ˈbukʲɪ]	[b] or [bʲ]	b	bad	оба óba "both"	—N/a	U+0411 / U+0431
Вв		В в	вэ [vɛ] ve/veh	вѣди [ˈvʲedʲɪ]	[v] or [vʲ]	v	vine	вода vodá "water"	2	U+0412 / U+0432
Гг		Г г	гэ [ɡɛ] ghe/gheh	глаголь [ɡɫɐˈɡolʲ]	[ɡ] or [gʲ]	g	go	год god "year"	3	U+0413 / U+0433
Дд^{†}		Д д	дэ [dɛ] de/deh	добро [dɐˈbro]	[d] or [dʲ]	d	do	да da "yes"	4	U+0414 / U+0434
Ее		Е е	е [je]	есть [jesʲtʲ]	[je], [ ʲe] or [e]	ye, je, e	yes	не ne "not"	5	U+0415 / U+0435
Ёё		Ё ё	ё [jo]	–	[jo] or [ ʲo]	yo, jo, ë	yogurt	ёж yozh "hedgehog"	—N/a	U+0401 / U+0451
Жж		Ж ж	жэ [ʐɛ]	живѣте [ʐɨˈvʲetʲɪ] (Note: The dictionary makes difference between е and ё.)	[ʐ]	zh, ž	measure	жук zhuk "beetle"	—N/a	U+0416 / U+0436
Зз		З з	зэ [zɛ] ze/zeh	земля [zʲɪˈmlʲa]	[z] or [zʲ]	z	zoo	зной znoy "heat"	7	U+0417 / U+0437
Ии		И и	и [i] ee	иже [ˈiʐɨ]	[i], [ ʲi], or [ɨ]	i	police	или íli "or"	8	U+0418 / U+0438
Йй		Й й	и краткое 'short i' [ˈi ˈkratkəjə]	и съ краткой [ɪ s ˈkratkəj]	[j]	y, i, j	you or toy	мой moy "my, mine"	—N/a	U+0419 / U+0439
Кк		К к	ка [ka]	како [ˈkakə]	[k] or [kʲ]	k	kept	кто kto "who"	20	U+041A / U+043A
Лл^{‡}		Л л	эль [ɛlʲ]	люди [ˈlʲʉdʲɪ]	[ɫ] or [lʲ]	l	feel or lamp	луч luch "ray"	30	U+041B / U+043B
Мм		М м	эм [ɛm] em/ehm	мыслѣте [mɨˈsʲlʲetʲɪ]	[m] or [mʲ]	m	map	меч mech "sword"	40	U+041C / U+043C
Нн		Н н	эн [ɛn] en/ehn	нашъ [naʂ]	[n] or [nʲ]	n	not	но no "but"	50	U+041D / U+043D
Оо		О о	о [о]	онъ [on]	[o]	o	more	он on "he"	70	U+041E / U+043E
Пп		П п	пэ [pɛ] pe/peh	покой [pɐˈkoj]	[p] or [pʲ]	p	pet	под pod "under"	80	U+041F / U+043F
Рр		Р р	эр [ɛr] err/ehrr	рцы [rtsɨ]	[r] or [rʲ]	r	rolled r	река reká "river"	100	U+0420 / U+0440
Сс		С с	эс [ɛs] es/ehs	слово [ˈsɫovə]	[s] or [sʲ]	s	set	если yésli "if"	200	U+0421 / U+0441
Тт		Т т	тэ [tɛ] te/teh	твердо [ˈtvʲerdə]	[t] or [tʲ]	t	top	тот tot "that"	300	U+0422 / U+0442
Уу		У у	у [u] oo	укъ [uk]	[u]	u	tool	куст kust "bush"	400	U+0423 / U+0443
Фф		Ф ф	эф [ɛf] ef/ehf	фертъ [fʲert]	[f] or [fʲ]	f	face	фея féya "fairy"	500	U+0424 / U+0444
Хх		Х х	ха [xa]	хѣръ [xʲer]	[x] or [xʲ]	kh, h	like Scottish "loch", ugh	дух dukh "spirit"	600	U+0425 / U+0445
Цц		Ц ц	цэ [tsɛ] tse/tseh	цы [tsɨ]	[t͡s]	ts, c	sits	конец konéts "end"	900	U+0426 / U+0446
Чч		Ч ч	че [tɕe]	червь [tɕerfʲ]	[t͡ɕ] or [tʃ]	ch, č	check	час chas "hour"	90	U+0427 / U+0447
Шш		Ш ш	ша [ʂa]	ша [ʂa]	[ʂ] or [ʃ]	sh, š	similar to "sh" in hush	ваш vash "yours"	—N/a	U+0428 / U+0448
Щщ		Щ щ	ща [ɕːa]	ща [ɕtɕa]	[ɕː], [ɕ]	shch, sch, šč, śś	similar to a long "sh" as in push ships or a short "sh" as in sheep	щека śeká "cheek"	—N/a	U+0429 / U+0449
Ъъ		Ъ ъ	твёрдый знак 'hard sign' [ˈtvʲɵrdɨj znak]	еръ [jer]	[∅]	ʺ	silent, prevents palatalization of the preceding consonant	объект obʺyékt "object"	—N/a	U+042A / U+044A
Ыы		Ы ы	ы [ɨ]	еры [jɪˈrɨ]	[ɨ] or [i]	y	General American roses (rough equivalent)	ты ty "you"	—N/a	U+042B / U+044B
Ьь		Ь ь	мягкий знак 'soft sign' [ˈmʲæxʲkʲɪj znak]	ерь [jerʲ]	[ ʲ]	ʹ	silent, palatalizes the preceding consonant (if phonologically possible)	гусь gusʹ "goose"	—N/a	U+042C / U+044C
Ээ		Э э	э [ɛ] e/eh	э оборотное 'rotated «э»' [ˈɛ ɐbɐˈrotnəjɪ]	[ɛ] or [e]	e, è	met	это èto "this"	—N/a	U+042D / U+044D
Юю		Ю ю	ю [ju] ew	ю [ju]	[ju] or [ ʲu]	yu, ju	use or youth	юг yug "south"	—N/a	U+042E / U+044E
Яя		Я я	я [ja]	я [ja]	[ja] or [ ʲa]	ya, ja	yard	ряд ryad "row"	—N/a	U+042F / U+044F

^† An alternative form of the letter De (Д д) closely resembles the Greek letter delta (Δ δ).
^‡ An alternative form of the letter El (Л л) closely resembles the Greek letter lambda (Λ λ).

== Historic letters ==
=== Letters eliminated in 1917–1918 ===
Letter	Cursive	Italics	Old name	IPA	Common transliteration	Similar Russian letter	Examples	No.	Unicode (Hex)
Іі		І і	і десятеричное [i dʲɪsʲɪtʲɪˈrʲitɕnəjə]	/i/, /ʲi/, /j/	i	Like и or й	стихотворенія (now стихотворения) stikhotvoréniya "poems, (of) poem"	10	U+0406 / U+0456
Ѣѣ		Ѣ ѣ	ять [jætʲ]	/e/, /ʲe/	ě	Like е	Алексѣй (now Алексей) Aleksěy; Alexey	—N/a	U+0462 / U+0463
Ѳѳ		Ѳ ѳ	ѳита [fʲɪˈta]	/f/, /fʲ/, /θ/	f	Like ф	орѳографія (now орфография) orfográfiya "orthography, spelling"	9	U+0472 / U+0473
Ѵѵ		Ѵ ѵ	ижица [ˈiʐɨtsə]	/i/, /ʲi/	y or í	Usually like и, see below	мѵро (now миро) myro or míro "chrism (myrrh)"	400	U+0474 / U+0475

- і — Identical in pronunciation to ⟨и⟩, it was used exclusively immediately before other vowels and the ⟨й⟩ ("Short I") (for example, ⟨патріархъ⟩ [pətrʲɪˈarx], 'patriarch') and in the word ⟨міръ⟩ [mʲir] ('world') and its derivatives, to distinguish it from the word ⟨миръ⟩ [mʲir] ('peace') (the two words are actually etymologically cognate, and not arbitrarily homonyms).
- ѣ — Originally had a distinct sound, but by the middle of the eighteenth century, it had become identical in pronunciation to ⟨е⟩ in the standard language. Since its elimination in 1918, it has remained a political symbol of the old orthography.
- ѳ — From the Greek theta, it was identical to ⟨ф⟩ in pronunciation, but it was used etymologically (for example, ⟨Ѳёдоръ⟩ "Theodore" became ⟨Фёдор⟩ "Fyodor").
- ѵ — From the Greek upsilon, usually identical to ⟨и⟩ in pronunciation, as in Byzantine Greek, it was used etymologically for Greek loanwords, like Latin Y (as in synod, myrrh); by 1918, it had become very rare. In spellings of the eighteenth century, it was also used after some vowels, where it has since been replaced with ⟨в⟩ or (rarely) ⟨у⟩. For example, a Greek prefix originally spelled ⟨аѵто-⟩ (equivalent to English auto-) is now spelled ⟨авто-⟩ in most cases and ⟨ауто-⟩ as a component in some compound words.

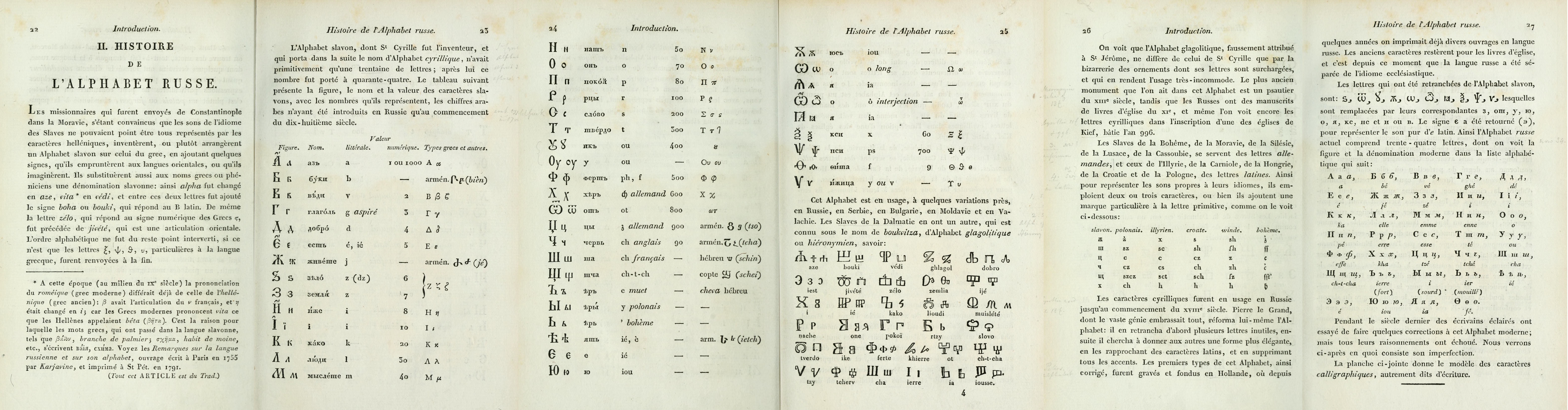
Historical evolution of the Russian Cyrillic alphabet, until the 19th century

19th century Russian Cyrillic alphabet

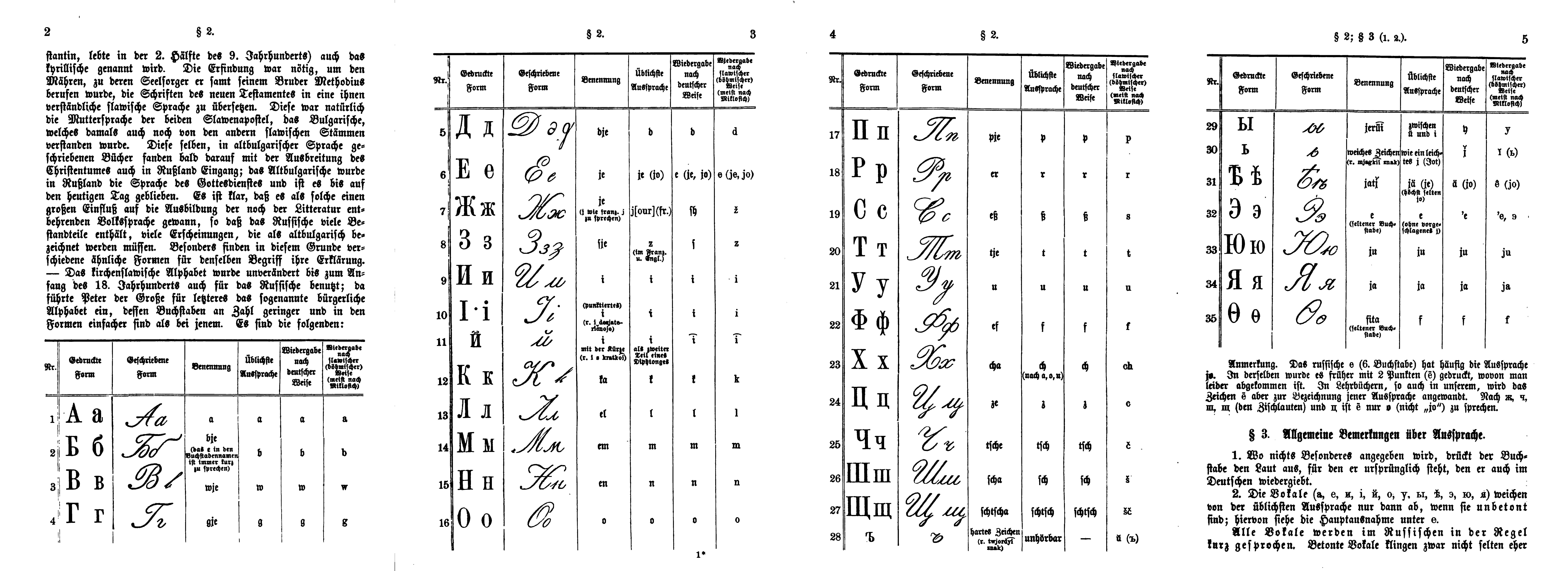
(Körner, 1895)

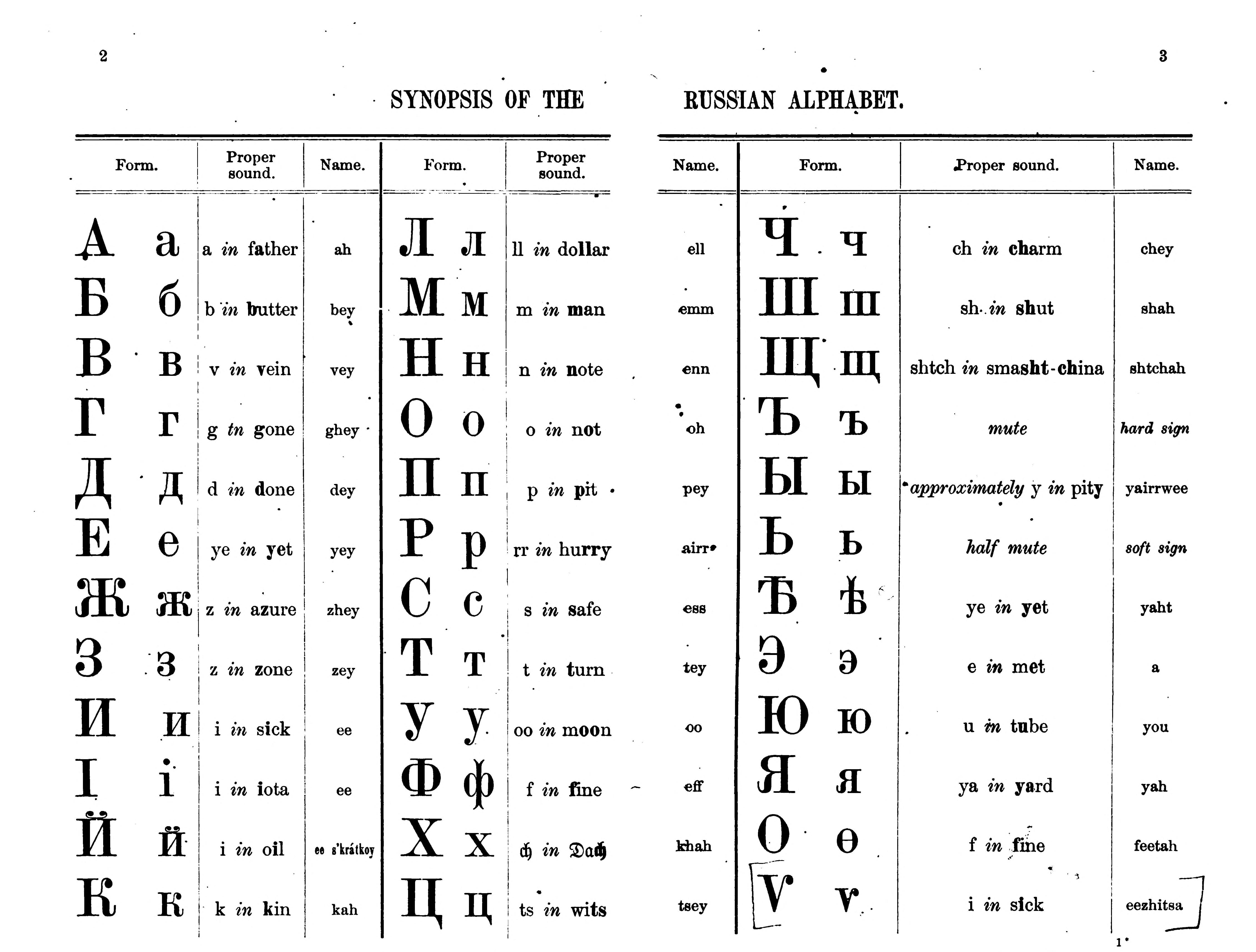
(Motti, 1890)

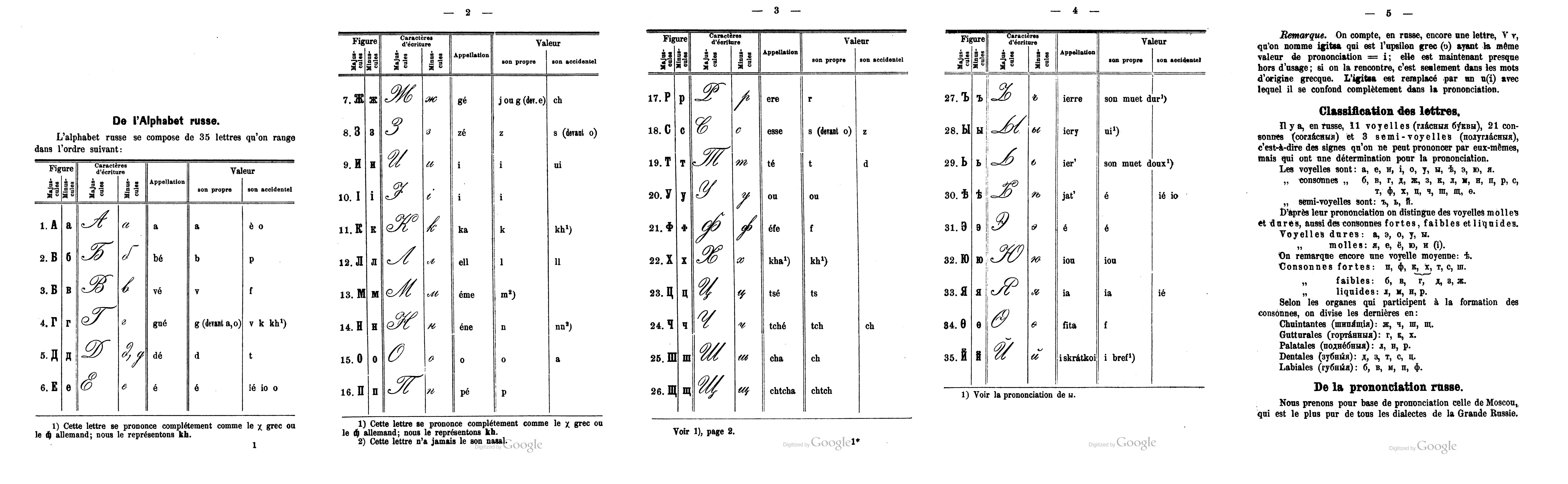
(Fuchs, 1888)

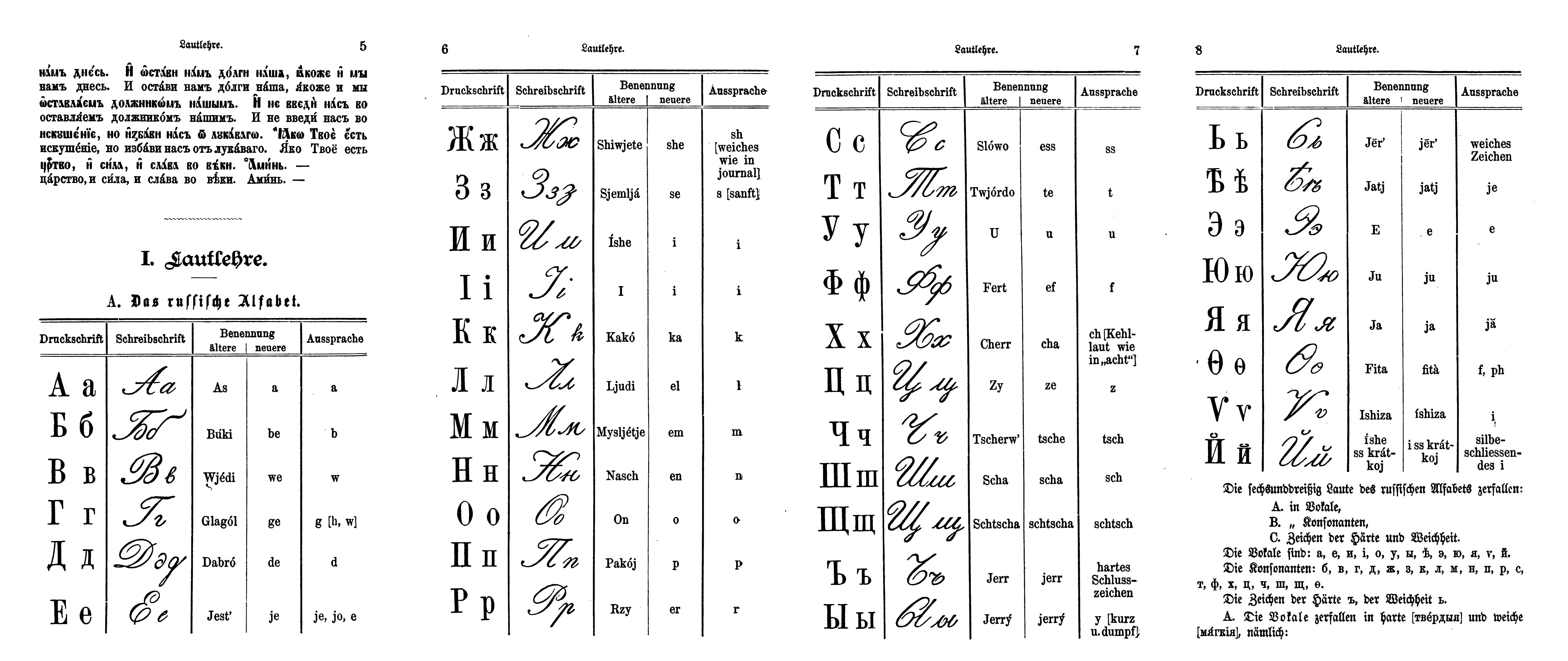
(Moser, 1888)

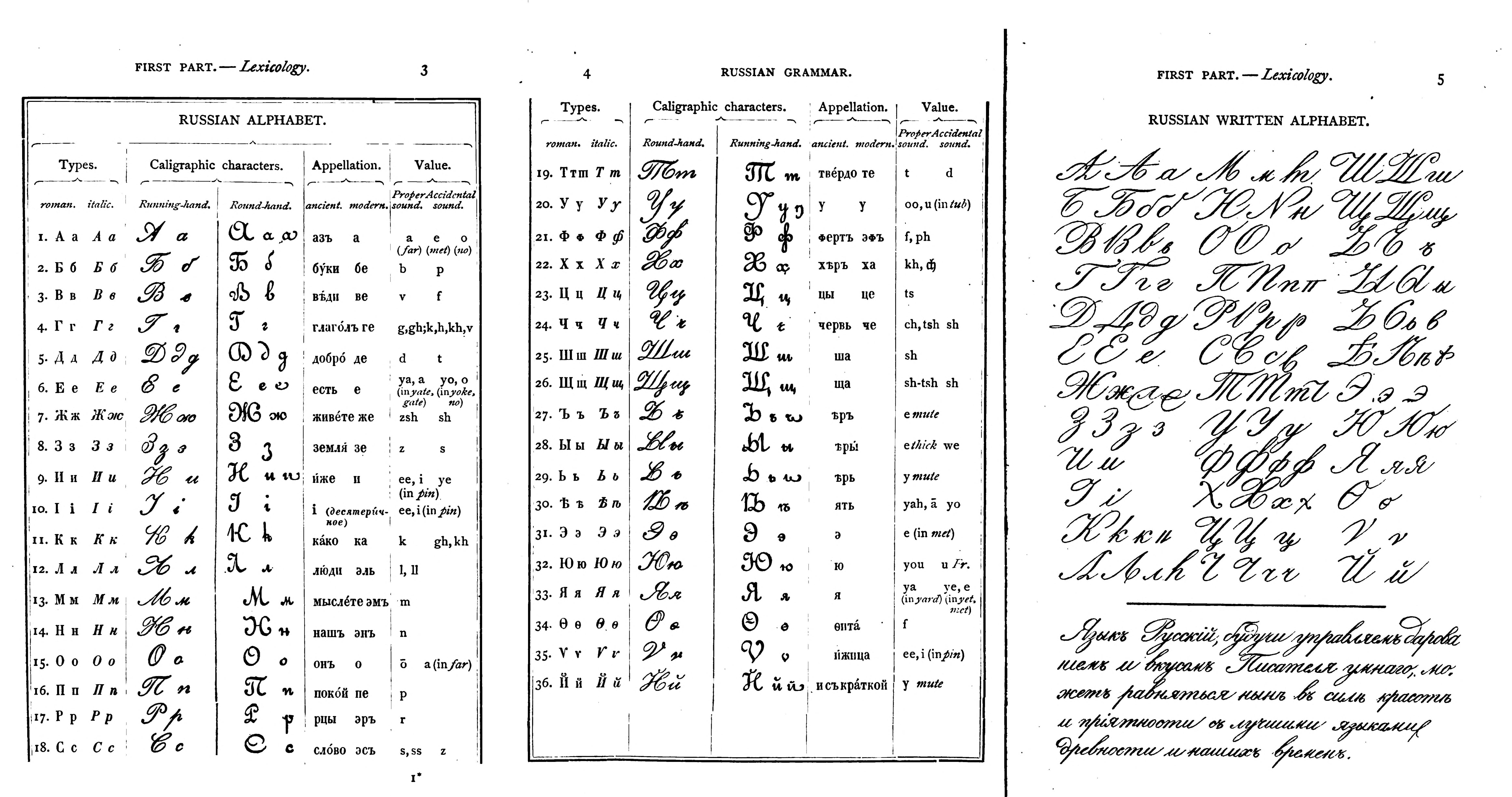
(Reiff, 1883)

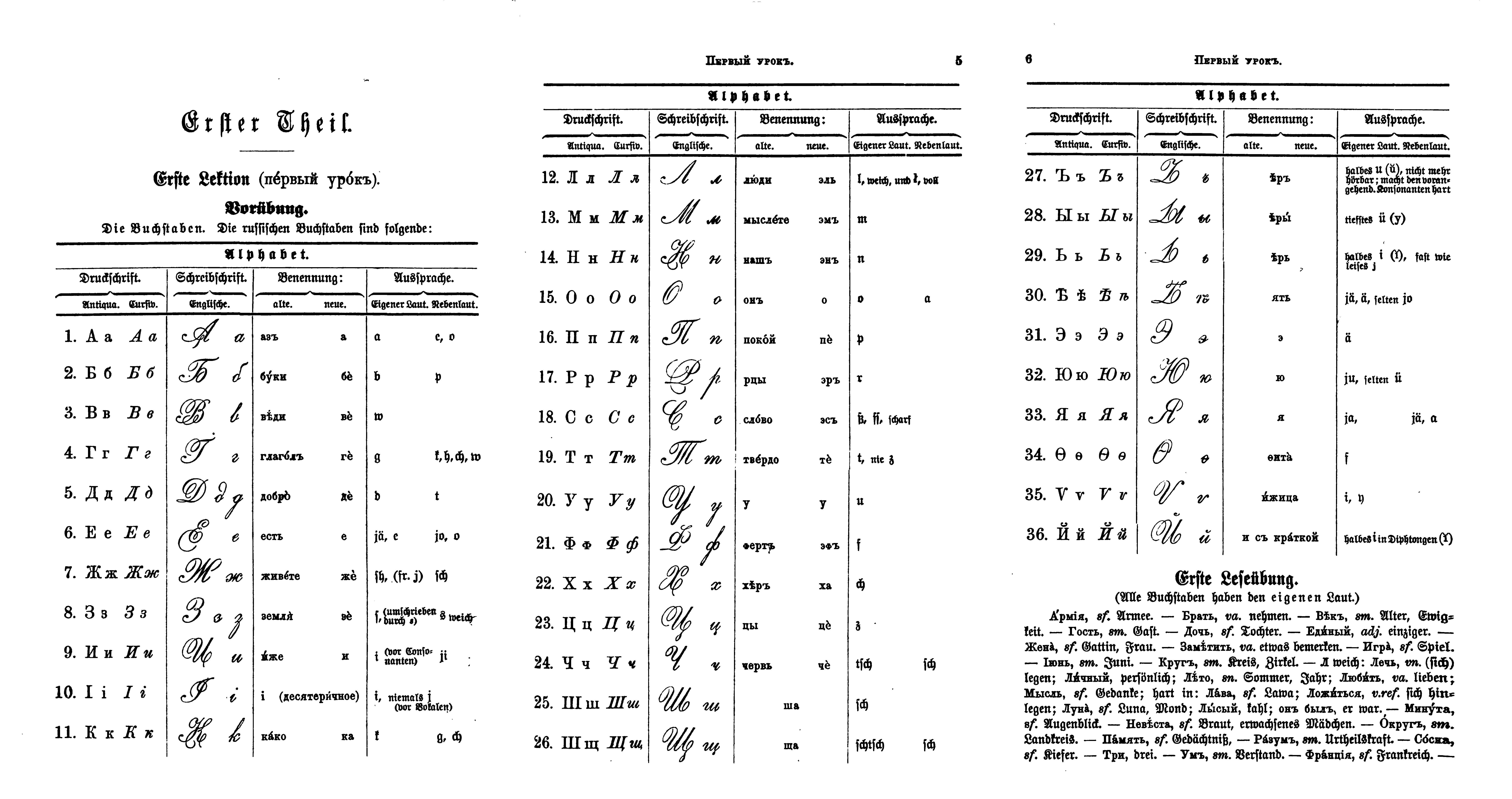
(Boltz, 1880)

=== Letters eliminated before 1750 ===
Letter	Cursive	Italics	Old name	IPA	Common transliteration	Similar Russian letter	Examples	No.	Unicode (Hex)
Ѕѕ	–	Ѕ ѕ	ѕѣло [zʲɪˈɫo]	/z/, /zʲ/	z	з	sѣлѡ (obsolete stem, now очень) "very"	6	U+0405, U+0455
Ѯѯ	–	Ѯ ѯ	ѯи [ksʲi]	/ks/, /ksʲ/	x, ks	кс	Алеѯандръ (now Александр) "Alexander"	60	U+046E, U+046F
Ѱѱ	–	Ѱ ѱ	ѱи [psʲi]	/ps/, /psʲ/	ps	пс	ѱаломъ (now псалом) "psalm"	700	U+0470, U+0471
Ѡѡ	–	Ѡ ѡ	ѡмега [ɐˈmʲeɡə]	/o/	o, w	о	ѡбразъ (now образ) "image, icon"	800	U+0460, U+0461
Ѫѫ		Ѫ ѫ	юсъ большой [jus bɐlʲˈʂoj]	/u/, / ʲu/	ą	у, ю	пѫть (now путь) "way"	—N/a	U+046A, U+046B
Ѧѧ		Ѧ ѧ	юсъ малый [jus ˈmaɫɨj]	/ ʲa/	ę	я	пѧть (now пять) "five"	900	U+0466, U+0467
Ѭѭ	–	Ѭ ѭ	юсъ большой іотированный [jus bɐlʲˈʂoj jɪˈtʲirəvənnɨj]	/ju/	yą	ю	знаѭ (now знаю) "(I) know"	—N/a	U+046C, U+046D
Ѩѩ	–	Ѩ ѩ	юсъ малый іотированный [jus ˈmaɫɨj jɪˈtʲirəvən.nɨj]	/ja/	yę	я	ѩзыкъ (now язык) "tongue, language"	—N/a	U+0468, U+0469

- ⟨ѕ⟩ corresponded to a more archaic /dz/ pronunciation, already absent in East Slavic at the start of the historical period, but kept by tradition in certain words until the eighteenth century in secular writing and in Church Slavonic and Macedonian to the present day.
- ⟨ѯ⟩ and ⟨ѱ⟩ derived from Greek letters xi and psi. It was used etymologically, though inconsistently, in secular writing until the eighteenth century and more consistently to the present day in Church Slavonic.
- ⟨ѡ⟩ is the Greek letter omega, identical in pronunciation to ⟨о⟩. It was used in secular writing until the eighteenth century, but in the present day in Church Slavonic, it was mostly used to distinguish inflexional forms otherwise written identically.
- Two "yuses", "big" ⟨ѫ⟩ and "small" ⟨ѧ⟩, used to stand for nasalized vowels /õ/ and /ẽ/. According to linguistic reconstruction, both became irrelevant for East Slavic phonology at the beginning of the historical period but were introduced along with the rest of the Cyrillic script. The iotated yuses, ⟨ѭ⟩ and ⟨ѩ⟩, had largely vanished by the twelfth century. The uniotated ⟨ѫ⟩ continued to be used, etymologically, until the sixteenth century. Thereafter it was restricted to being a dominical letter in the Paschal tables. The seventeenth-century usage of ⟨ѫ⟩ and ⟨ѧ⟩ survives in contemporary Church Slavonic, and the sounds (but not the letters) in Polish.
- The letter ⟨ѧ⟩ was adapted to represent the iotated /ja/ ⟨я⟩ in the middle or end of a word; the modern letter ⟨я⟩ is an adaptation of its cursive form of the seventeenth century, enshrined by the typographical reform of 1708.
- Until 1708, the iotated /ja/ was written ⟨ꙗ⟩ at the beginning of a word. This distinction between ⟨ѧ⟩ and ⟨ꙗ⟩ survives in Church Slavonic.

Although it is usually stated that the letters in the table above were eliminated in the typographical reform of 1708, reality is somewhat more complex. The letters were indeed originally omitted from the sample alphabet, printed in a western-style serif font, presented in Peter's edict, along with the letters ⟨з⟩ (replaced by ⟨ѕ⟩), ⟨и⟩ and ⟨ф⟩ (the diacriticized letter ⟨й⟩ was also removed), but were reinstated except ⟨ѱ⟩ and ⟨ѡ⟩ under pressure from the Russian Orthodox Church in a later variant of the modern typeface (1710). Nonetheless, since 1735, the Russian Academy of Sciences began to use fonts without ⟨ѕ⟩, ⟨ѯ⟩ and ⟨ѵ⟩; however, ⟨ѵ⟩ was sometimes used again since 1758.

== Consonants ==
Consonants
Either hard (default) or soft	Б, В, Г, Д, З, К, Л, М, Н, П, Р, С, Т, Ф, Х
Always hard	Ж, Ш, Ц
Always soft	Й, Ч, Щ

Most consonants can represent both "soft" (palatalized, represented in the IPA with a ⟨ʲ⟩) and "hard" consonant phonemes. If consonant letters are followed by vowel letters, the soft/hard quality of the consonant depends on whether the vowel is meant to follow "hard" consonants ⟨а, о, э, у, ы⟩ or "soft" consonants ⟨я, ё, е, ю, и⟩. A soft sign ⟨ь⟩ indicates palatalization of the preceding consonant without adding a vowel.

However, in modern Russian, six consonant phonemes do not have phonemically distinct "soft" and "hard" variants (except in foreign proper names) and do not change "softness" in the presence of other letters: /ʐ/, /ʂ/ and /ts/ are always hard; /j/, /tɕ/ and /ɕː/ are always soft. (Before 1950, Russian linguists considered /j/ a semivowel rather than a consonant.)

== Vowels ==
Vowels
Hard	А	Э	Ы	О	У
Soft	Я	Е	И	Ё	Ю
Each row is roughly analogous to the Latin A, E, I, O, U.

The Russian alphabet contains 10 vowel letters. They are grouped into soft and hard vowels. The soft vowels, ⟨е, ё, и, ю, я⟩, either indicate a preceding palatalized consonant, or (with the exception of ⟨и⟩) are iotated (pronounced with a preceding /j/) in all other cases. The IPA vowels shown are a guideline only and sometimes are realized as different sounds, particularly when unstressed. However, ⟨е⟩ may be used in words of foreign origin without palatalization (/e/), and ⟨я⟩ is often realized as [æ] between soft consonants, such as in мяч ('toy ball').

=== Individual vowels ===
⟨ы⟩ is an old Proto-Slavic close central vowel, thought to have been preserved better in modern Russian than in other Slavic languages. It was originally nasalized in certain positions: Old Russian камы [ˈkamɨ̃]; Modern Russian камень [ˈkamʲɪnʲ] ('rock'). Its written form developed as follows: ⟨ъ⟩ + ⟨і⟩ → ⟨ꙑ⟩ → ⟨ы⟩.

⟨э⟩ was introduced in 1708 to distinguish the non-iotated/non-palatalizing /e/ from the iotated/palatalizing one. The original usage had been ⟨е⟩ for the uniotated /e/, ⟨ѥ⟩ or ⟨ѣ⟩ for the iotated, but ⟨ѥ⟩ had dropped out of use by the sixteenth century. In native Russian words, ⟨э⟩ is found only at the beginnings of a few words э́тот/э́та/э́то 'this (is) (m./f./n.)', э́ти 'these', э́кий 'what a', э́дак/э́так 'that way', э́дакий/э́такий 'sort of', and interjections like эй 'hey') or in compound words (e.g., поэ́тому 'therefore' = по + этому, where этому is the dative case of этот). In words that come from foreign languages in which iotated /e/ is uncommon or nonexistent (such as English), ⟨э⟩ is usually written in the beginning of words and after vowels except ⟨и⟩ (e.g., поэ́т, 'poet'), and ⟨е⟩ after ⟨и⟩ and consonants. However, the pronunciation is inconsistent. Many of these borrowed words, especially monosyllables, words ending in ⟨е⟩ and many words where ⟨е⟩ follows ⟨т⟩, ⟨д⟩, ⟨н⟩, ⟨с⟩, ⟨з⟩ or ⟨р⟩, are pronounced with /e/ without palatalization or iotation: секс (seks — 'sex'), моде́ль (model — 'model'), кафе́ (kafe — 'café'), прое́кт (proekt — 'project'; here, the spelling is etymological: German Projekt was adopted from Latin proiectum, so the word is spelled with ⟨е⟩ to reflect the original /je/ and not with ⟨э⟩ as usual after vowels; but the pronunciation is counter-etymological: a hypercorrection that has become standard). But many other words are pronounced with /ʲe/: се́кта (syekta — 'sect'), дебю́т (dyebyut — 'debut').

Proper names are sometimes written with ⟨э⟩ after consonants: Сэм — 'Sam', Мэ́ри — 'Mary', Ма́о Цзэду́н — 'Mao Zedong'; the use of ⟨э⟩ after consonants is common in East Asian names and in English names with the sounds /æ/ and /ɛər/, with some exceptions such as Джек ('Jack') and Ше́ннон ('Shannon'), since both ⟨э⟩ and ⟨е⟩, in cases of же ("zhe"), ше ("she") and це ("tse"), follow consonants that are always hard (non-palatalized), yet ⟨е⟩ usually prevails in writing. However, English names with the sounds /ɛ/, /ə/ (if spelled ⟨e⟩ in English) and /eɪ/ after consonants are normally spelled with ⟨е⟩ in Russian: Бе́тти — 'Betty', Пи́тер — 'Peter', Лейк-Плэ́сид — 'Lake Placid'. Pronunciation mostly remains unpalatalized, so Пи́тер [ˈpʲitɛr] — Russian rendering of the English name 'Peter' is pronounced differently from Пи́тер [ˈpʲitʲɪr] — is a colloquial Russian name of Saint Petersburg.

⟨ё⟩, introduced by Karamzin in 1797 and made official in 1943 by the Soviet Ministry of Education, marks a /jo/ sound that historically developed from stressed /je/. The written letter ⟨ё⟩ is optional; it is formally correct to write ⟨e⟩ for both /je/ and /jo/. None of the several attempts in the twentieth century to mandate the use of ⟨ё⟩ have stuck.

== Non-vocalized letters ==
=== Hard sign ===
The hard sign, ⟨ъ⟩, acts like a "silent back vowel" that separates a succeeding "soft vowel" (⟨е, ё, ю, я⟩, but not ⟨и⟩) from a preceding consonant, invoking implicit iotation of the vowel with a distinct /j/ glide. Today it is used mostly to separate a prefix ending with a hard consonant from the following root. Its original pronunciation, lost by 1400 at the latest, was that of a very short middle schwa-like sound, likely pronounced [ə] or [ɯ]. Until the 1918 reform, no written word could end in a consonant: those that end in a "hard" consonant in modern orthography then had a final ⟨ъ⟩.

While ⟨и⟩ is also a soft vowel, root-initial /i/ following a hard consonant is typically pronounced as [ɨ]. This is normally spelled ⟨ы⟩ (the hard counterpart to ⟨и⟩) unless this vowel occurs at the beginning of a word, in which case it remains ⟨и⟩. An alternation between the two letters (but not the sounds) can be seen with the pair без и́мени ('without name', which is pronounced [bʲɪz ˈɨmʲɪnʲɪ]) and безымя́нный ('nameless', which is pronounced [bʲɪzɨˈmʲænːɨj]). This spelling convention, however, is not applied with certain loaned prefixes such as in the word панислами́зм — [ˌpanɨsɫɐˈmʲizm], 'Pan-Islamism') and compound words (e.g., госизме́на — [ˌɡosɨˈzmʲenə], 'high treason').

=== Soft sign ===
The soft sign, ⟨ь⟩, in most positions acts like a "silent front vowel" and indicates that the preceding consonant is palatalized (except for always-hard ж, ш, ц) and the following vowel (if present) is iotated (including ⟨ьо⟩ in loans). This is important as palatalization is phonemic in Russian. For example, брат [brat] ('brother') contrasts with брать [bratʲ] ('to take'). The original pronunciation of the soft sign, lost by 1400 at the latest, was that of a very short fronted reduced vowel /ĭ/ but likely pronounced [ɪ] or [jɪ]. There are still some remnants of this ancient reading in modern Russian, e.g., in co-existing versions of the same name, read and written differently, such as Марья and Мария ('Mary').

When applied after stem-final always-soft (ч, щ, but not й) or always-hard (ж, ш, but not ц) consonants, the soft sign does not alter pronunciation, but has grammatical significance:

- the feminine marker for singular nouns in the nominative and accusative; e.g., тушь ('India ink', feminine) cf. туш ('flourish after a toast', masculine) — both pronounced [tuʂ];
- the imperative mood for some verbs;
- the infinitives of some verbs (with -чь ending);
- the second person for non-past verbs (with -шь ending); and
- some adverbs and particles.

== Treatment of foreign sounds ==
Because Russian borrows terms from other languages, there are various conventions for sounds not present in Russian. For example, while Russian has no [h], there are a number of common words (particularly proper nouns) borrowed from languages like English and German that contain such a sound in the original language. In well-established terms, such as галлюцинация [ɡəlʲʊtsɨˈnatsɨjə] ('hallucination'), this is written with ⟨г⟩ and pronounced with /ɡ/, while newer terms use ⟨х⟩, pronounced with /x/, such as хобби [ˈxobʲɪ] ('hobby'). Similarly, words originally with [θ] in their source language are either pronounced with /t(ʲ)/, as in the name Тельма ('Thelma') or, if borrowed early enough, with /f(ʲ)/ or /v(ʲ)/, as in the names Фёдор ('Theodore') and Матве́й ('Matthew').

For the [d͡ʒ] affricate, which is common in the Asian countries that were part of the Russian Empire and the USSR, the letter combination ⟨дж⟩ is used: this is often transliterated into English either as ⟨dzh⟩ or the Dutch form ⟨dj⟩.

== Numeric values ==
The numerical values correspond to the Greek numerals, with ⟨ѕ⟩ being used for digamma, ⟨ч⟩ for koppa, and ⟨ц⟩ for sampi. The system was abandoned for secular purposes in 1708, after a transitional period of a century or so; it continues to be used in Church Slavonic, while general Russian texts use Indo-Arabic numerals and Roman numerals.

== Diacritics ==
The Cyrillic alphabet and Russian spelling generally employ fewer diacritics than those used in other European languages written with the Latin alphabet. The only diacritic, in the proper sense, is the acute accent ⟨◌́⟩ (Russian: знак ударения 'mark of stress'), which marks stress on a vowel, as it is done in Spanish and Greek. (Unicode has no code points for the accented letters; they are instead produced by suffixing the unaccented letter with U+0301 ◌́ COMBINING ACUTE ACCENT.) Although Russian word stress is often unpredictable and can fall on different syllables in different forms of the same word, the diacritic accent is used only in dictionaries, children's books, resources for foreign-language learners, the defining entry (in bold) in articles on Russian Wikipedia, or on minimal pairs distinguished only by stress (for instance, за́мок 'castle' vs. замо́к 'lock'). Rarely, it is also used to specify the stress in uncommon foreign words, and in poems with unusual stress used to fit the meter.

The letter ⟨ё⟩ is a special variant of the letter ⟨е⟩, which is not always distinguished in written Russian, but the umlaut-like sign has no other uses. Stress on this letter is never marked with a diacritic, as it is always stressed (except in some compounds and loanwords).

Both ⟨ё⟩ and the letter ⟨й⟩ have completely separated from ⟨е⟩ and ⟨и⟩. ⟨Й⟩ has been used since the 16th century (except that it was removed in 1708, but reinstated in 1735). Since then, its usage has been mandatory. It was formerly considered a diacriticized letter, but in the 20th century, it came to be considered a separate letter of the Russian alphabet. It was classified as a "semivowel" by 19th- and 20th-century grammarians, but since the 1970s, it has been considered a consonant letter.

== Frequency ==
The frequency of characters in a corpus of written Russian was found to be as follows:

Rank	Letter	Frequency	Other information	English comparison
1	О	11.18%		By comparison, 'e' in English appears about 13% in texts.
2	Е	8.75%	Foreign words sometimes use Е rather than Э, even if it is pronounced e instead of ye. In addition, Ё is often replaced by Е; this makes Е even more common.	'T' appears about 9.1%
3	А	7.64%		'A' appears about 8.2%
4	И	7.09%		'O' appears about 7.5%
5	Н	6.78%	The most common consonant in the Russian alphabet.	'I' appears about 7%
6	Т	6.09%		
7	С	4.97%		
8	Л	4.96%		
9	В	4.38%		
10	Р	4.23%		
11	К	3.30%		
12	М	3.17%		
13	Д	3.09%		
14	П	2.47%		
15	Ы	2.36%		
16	У	2.22%		
17	Б	2.01%		
18	Я	1.96%		
19	Ь	1.84%		
20	Г	1.72%		
21	З	1.48%		
22	Ч	1.40%		
23	Й	1.21%		
24	Ж	1.01%		
25	Х	0.95%		
26	Ш	0.72%		
27	Ю	0.47%		
28	Ц	0.39%		
29	Э	0.36%	Foreign words sometimes use Е rather than Э, even if it is pronounced e instead of ye. In addition, Ё is often replaced by Е; this makes Е even more common.	K : 0.77%
30	Щ	0.30%		J : 0.15%
31	Ф	0.21%	The least common consonant in the Russian alphabet.	X : 0.15%
32	Ё	0.20%	In written Russian, ⟨ё⟩ is often replaced by ⟨е⟩.	Q : 0.095%
33	Ъ	0.02%	⟨Ъ⟩ used to be a very common letter in the Russian alphabet. This is because before the 1918 reform, any word ending with a non-palatalized consonant was written with a final Ъ — e.g., pre-1918 вотъ vs. post-reform вот. The reform eliminated the use of Ъ in this context, leaving it the least common letter in the Russian alphabet.	'Z' : 0.074%

== Keyboard layout ==
Microsoft Windows keyboard layout for personal computers is as follows:

However, there are several variations of so-called "phonetic keyboards" that are often used by non-Russians, where pressing an English letter key will type the Russian letter with a similar sound (A → А, S → С, D → Д, F → Ф, etc.).

== Letter names ==
Until approximately the year 1900, mnemonic names inherited from Church Slavonic were used for the letters. They are given here in the pre-1918 orthography of the post-1708 civil alphabet.

The Russian poet Alexander Pushkin wrote: "The [names of the] letters that make up the Slavonic alphabet don't represent a meaning at all. Аз, буки, веди, глаголь, добро etc. are individual words, chosen just for their initial sound". However, since the names of the first few letters of the Slavonic alphabet seem to form readable text, attempts have been made to compose meaningful snippets of text from groups of consecutive letters for the rest of the alphabet.

== See also ==
- Belarusian alphabet
- Bulgarian alphabet
- Computer russification
- Cyrillic alphabets
- List of Cyrillic digraphs and trigraphs
- Reforms of Russian orthography
- Romanization of Russian
- Russian Braille
- Russian cursive
- Russian Latin alphabet
- Russian manual alphabet
- Russian Morse code
- Russian orthography
- Russian phonology
- Scientific transliteration of Cyrillic
- Serbian Cyrillic alphabet
- Ukrainian alphabet
- Yoficator

== Bibliography ==
- Benson, Morton (1960), "Review of The Russian Alphabet by Thomas F. Magner", The Slavic and East European Journal, 4 (3): 271–72, doi:10.2307/304189, JSTOR 304189
- Dunn, John; Khairov, Shamil (2009), Modern Russian Grammar, Modern Grammars, Routledge
- Smirnovskiy, P (1915), A Textbook in Russian Grammar, vol. Part I. Etymology (26th ed.), Canada: Shaw
- Rakhlin, Natalia; Kornilov, Sergey A.; Grigorenko, Elena L. (12 October 2017). "Learning to Read Russian". Learning to Read across Languages and Writing Systems. Cambridge University Press. ISBN 978-1-107-09588-5.
- Ushakov, Dmitry (1935). Толковый словарь русского языка Толковый словарь русского языка Ушакова [Explanatory Dictionary of the Russian Language] (in Russian). Vol. 1. Moscow: Государственное издательство иностранных и национальных словарей.
- Ushakov, Dmitry (1938). Толковый словарь русского языка Толковый словарь русского языка Ушакова [Explanatory Dictionary of the Russian Language] (in Russian). Vol. 2. Moscow: Государственное издательство иностранных и национальных словарей.
- Vasmer, Max (1986). Этимологический словарь русского языка [Etymological Dictionary of the Russian Language]. Vol. 2. Moscow: Прогресс.
