= KOI-8 =

Character set

- Language: Russian (basic support)
- Standard: GOST 19768-74
- Classification: Extended ISO 646, KOI
- Extensions: KOI8-B (KOI8-R, KOI8-U, KOI8-RU, KOI8-T, ISO-IR-111, KOI8-F)
- Transforms / Encodes: ISO 646:IRV (lower); KOI-7 N1 (upper)
- Preceded by: KOI-7
- Succeeded by: ST SEV 358-88 (ISO-IR-153)
- Other related encoding: INIS Cyrillic

KOI-8 (Russian: Код Обмена Информацией, 8 бит, romanized: Kod Obmena Informatsiey, 8 bit, КОИ-8) is an 8-bit character set standardized in GOST 19768-74. It is an extension of KOI-7 which allows the use of the Latin alphabet along with the Russian alphabet, both the upper and lower case letters; however, the letter Ёё and the uppercase Ъ are missed, the latter to avoid conflicts with the delete character (both are added in most extensions, see KOI8-B). The first 127 code points are identical to ASCII with the exception of the dollar sign $ (code point 24_{hex}) replaced by the universal currency sign ¤. The rows x8_ and x9_ (code points 128–159) might be filled with the additional control characters from EBCDIC (code points 32–63).

This standard has become the base for the later Internet standards such as KOI8-RU.

Unicode is preferred to KOI-8 and its variants or other Cyrillic encodings in modern applications, especially on the Internet, making UTF-8 the dominant encoding for web pages. (For further discussion of Unicode's complete coverage, of 436 Cyrillic letters/code points, including for Old Cyrillic, and how single-byte character encodings, such as Windows-1251 and KOI8 variants, cannot provide this, see Cyrillic script in Unicode.)

== Character set ==
The following table shows the KOI-8 encoding. Each character is shown with its equivalent Unicode code point.

KOI-8
	0	1	2	3	4	5	6	7	8	9	A	B	C	D	E	F
0x	NUL	SOH	STX	ETX	EOT	ENQ	ACK	BEL	BS	HT	LF	VT	FF	CR	SO	SI
1x	DLE	DC1	DC2	DC3	DC4	NAK	SYN	ETB	CAN	EM	SUB	ESC	FS	GS	RS	US
2x	SP	!	"	#	¤/$ (Note: Originally given as a generic currency sign to match the ISO 646 IRV, which has itself since been changed to match ASCII in giving it as a dollar sign. KOI-8 variants and extensions in use tend to match ASCII here, see for example RFC 2319.) 00A4	%	&	'	(	)	*	+	,	-	.	/
3x	0	1	2	3	4	5	6	7	8	9	:	;	<	=	>	?
4x	@	A	B	C	D	E	F	G	H	I	J	K	L	M	N	O
5x	P	Q	R	S	T	U	V	W	X	Y	Z	[	\	]		_
6x	`	a	b	c	d	e	f	g	h	i	j	k	l	m	n	o
7x	p	q	r	s	t	u	v	w	x	y	z	{	|	}	~	DEL
8x																
9x																
Ax																
Bx																
Cx	ю 044E	а 0430	б 0431	ц 0446	д 0434	е 0435	ф 0444	г 0433	х 0445	и 0438	й 0439	к 043A	л 043B	м 043C	н 043D	о 043E
Dx	п 043F	я 044F	р 0440	с 0441	т 0442	у 0443	ж 0436	в 0432	ь 044C	ы 044B	з 0437	ш 0448	э 044D	щ 0449	ч 0447	ъ 044A
Ex	Ю 042E	А 0410	Б 0411	Ц 0426	Д 0414	Е 0415	Ф 0424	Г 0413	Х 0425	И 0418	Й 0419	К 041A	Л 041B	М 041C	Н 041D	О 041E
Fx	П 041F	Я 042F	Р 0420	С 0421	Т 0422	У 0423	Ж 0416	В 0412	Ь 042C	Ы 042B	З 0417	Ш 0428	Э 042D	Щ 0429	Ч 0427	

== See also ==
- KOI character encodings
