= KOI8-O =

Single-byte interchange encoding for Tajiki Cyrillic

- Language(s): Russian, Old Russian orthography, Belarusian, Ukrainian, Bulgarian, Serbian Cyrillic, Macedonian
- Created by: Serge Winitzki
- Classification: 8-bit KOI, extended ASCII
- Extends: KOI8-B
- Based on: KOI8-RU, KOI8-F, Windows-1251

KOI8-O, formerly known as KOI8-C, is an 8-bit character set. FreeDOS calls it code page 63342. It supports Old Russian orthography, as well as the same languages as Windows-1251.

== Character set ==
The following table shows the KOI8-O encoding. Each character is shown with its equivalent Unicode code point.

KOI8-O
| | 0 | 1 | 2 | 3 | 4 | 5 | 6 | 7 | 8 | 9 | A | B | C | D | E | F |
| 0x | NUL | ◆ 25C6 | ▒ 2592 | × 00D7 | ÷ 00F7 | ‰ 2030 | ≈ 2248 | µ 00B5 | ± 00B1 | ¶ 00B6 | ‡ 2021 | ┘ 2518 | ┐ 2510 | ┌ 250C | └ 2514 | ┼ 253C |
| 1x | | | ─ 2500 | | | ├ 251C | ┤ 2524 | ┴ 2534 | ┬ 252C | │ 2502 | ≤ 2264 | ≥ 2265 | ≠ 2260 | π 03C0 | ¤ 00A4 | ² 00B2 |
| 2x | SP | ! | " | # | $ | % | & | ' | ( | ) | * | + | , | - | . | / |
| 3x | 0 | 1 | 2 | 3 | 4 | 5 | 6 | 7 | 8 | 9 | : | ; | < | = | > | ? |
| 4x | @ | A | B | C | D | E | F | G | H | I | J | K | L | M | N | O |
| 5x | P | Q | R | S | T | U | V | W | X | Y | Z | [ | \ | ] | | _ |
| 6x | ` | a | b | c | d | e | f | g | h | i | j | k | l | m | n | o |
| 7x | p | q | r | s | t | u | v | w | x | y | z | { | | | } | ~ | ¬ 00AC |
| 8x | Ђ 0402 | Ѓ 0403 | ¸ 00B8 | ѓ 0453 | „ 2026 | … 2518 | †; 2020 | § 00A7 | € 20AC | ¨ 00A8 | Љ 0409 | ‹ 2039 | Њ 040A | Ќ 040C | Ћ 040B | Џ 040F |
| 9x | ђ 0452 | ‘ 2018 | ’ 2019 | “ 201C | ” 201D | • 2022 | – 2013 | — 2014 | £ 00A3 | · 00B7 | љ 0459 | › 203A | њ 045A | ќ 045C | ћ 045B | џ 045F |
| Ax | NBSP | ѵ 0475 | ѣ 0463 | ё 0451 | є 0454 | ѕ 0455 | і 0456 | ї 0457 | ј 0458 | ® 00AE | ™ 2122 | « 00AB | ѳ 0473 | ґ 0491 | ў 045E | ´ 00B4 |
| Bx | ° 00B0 | Ѵ 0474 | Ѣ 0462 | Ё 0401 | Є 0404 | Ѕ 0405 | І 0406 | Ї 0407 | Ј 0408 | № 2116 | ¢ 00A2 | » 00BB | Ѳ 0472 | Ґ 0490 | Ў 040E | © 00A9 |
| Cx | ю 044E | а 0430 | б 0431 | ц 0446 | д 0434 | е 0435 | ф 0444 | г 0433 | х 0445 | и 0438 | й 0439 | к 043A | л 043B | м 043C | н 043D | о 043E |
| Dx | п 043F | я 044F | р 0440 | с 0441 | т 0442 | у 0443 | ж 0436 | в 0432 | ь 044C | ы 044B | з 0437 | ш 0448 | э 044D | щ 0449 | ч 0447 | ъ 044A |
| Ex | Ю 042E | А 0410 | Б 0411 | Ц 0426 | Д 0414 | Е 0415 | Ф 0424 | Г 0413 | Х 0425 | И 0418 | Й 0419 | К 041A | Л 041B | М 041C | Н 041D | О 041E |
| Fx | П 041F | Я 042F | Р 0420 | С 0421 | Т 0422 | У 0423 | Ж 0416 | В 0412 | Ь 042C | Ы 042B | З 0417 | Ш 0428 | Э 042D | Щ 0429 | Ч 0427 | Ъ 042A |
