= KOI8-F =

Cyrillic character encoding variant

KOI8 Unified
- Alias(es): KOI8-F
- Languages: Belarusian, Ukrainian, Russian, Bulgarian, Serbian Cyrillic, Macedonian
- Created by: Peter Cassetta (Fingertip Software)
- Classification: 8-bit KOI, extended ASCII
- Extends: KOI8-B
- Based on: KOI8-RU, KOI8-E
- Other related encodings: KOI8-R, KOI8-U

KOI8-F or KOI8 Unified is an 8-bit character set. It was designed by Peter Cassetta of Fingertip Software (now defunct) as an attempt to support all the encoded letters from both KOI8-E (ISO-IR-111) and KOI8-RU (and hence also, KOI8-U and KOI8-R), along with some of the pseudographics from KOI8-R, with some additional punctuation in the remaining space, sourced partly from Windows-1251. This encoding was only used in the software of that company. FreeDOS calls it code page 60270.

== Character set ==
The following table shows the KOI8-F encoding. Each character is shown with its equivalent Unicode code point. Differences from ISO-IR-111 are boxed; other relevant encodings which are matched, if any, are noted in footnotes.

KOI8-F
| | 0 | 1 | 2 | 3 | 4 | 5 | 6 | 7 | 8 | 9 | A | B | C | D | E | F |
| 0x | | | | | | | | | | | | | | | | |
| 1x | | | | | | | | | | | | | | | | |
| 2x | SP | ! | " | # | $ | % | & | ' | ( | ) | * | + | , | - | . | / |
| 3x | 0 | 1 | 2 | 3 | 4 | 5 | 6 | 7 | 8 | 9 | : | ; | < | = | > | ? |
| 4x | @ | A | B | C | D | E | F | G | H | I | J | K | L | M | N | O |
| 5x | P | Q | R | S | T | U | V | W | X | Y | Z | [ | \ | ] | | _ |
| 6x | ` | a | b | c | d | e | f | g | h | i | j | k | l | m | n | o |
| 7x | p | q | r | s | t | u | v | w | x | y | z | { | | | } | ~ | |
| 8x | ─ (Note: Matching KOI8-R, KOI8-U, KOI8-RU.); 2500 | │ 2502 | ┌ 250C | ┐ 2510 | └ 2514 | ┘ 2518 | ├ 251C | ┤ 2524 | ┬ 252C | ┴ 2534 | ┼ 253C | ▀ 2580 | ▄ 2584 | █ 2588 | ▌ 258C | ▐ 2590 |
| 9x | ░ 2591 | ‘ (Note: Matching Windows-1251 and Windows-1252.); 2018 | ’ 2019 | “ 201C | ” 201D | ∙/• (Note: May be U+2219, which matches RFC 1489 (KOI8-R), or U+2022, which matches Windows-1251 and Windows-1252.) | – 2013 | — 2014 | © 00A9 | ™ 2122 | NBSP (Note: The non-breaking space is encoded twice: first at 0x9A matching KOI8-R, and then at 0xA0 matching KOI8-E (the latter of which also happens to be its location in Windows-1251 and Windows-1252).) | » 00BB | ® 00AE | « 00AB | · 00B7 | ¤ 00A4 |
| Ax | NBSP | ђ 0452 | ѓ 0453 | ё 0451 | є 0454 | ѕ 0455 | і 0456 | ї 0457 | ј 0458 | љ 0459 | њ 045A | ћ 045B | ќ 045C | ґ (Note: Matching KOI8-U and KOI8-RU.); 0491 | ў 045E | џ 045F |
| Bx | № 2116 | Ђ 0402 | Ѓ 0403 | Ё 0401 | Є 0404 | Ѕ 0405 | І 0406 | Ї 0407 | Ј 0408 | Љ 0409 | Њ 040A | Ћ 040B | Ќ 040C | Ґ 0490 | Ў 040E | Џ 040F |
| Cx | ю 044E | а 0430 | б 0431 | ц 0446 | д 0434 | е 0435 | ф 0444 | г 0433 | х 0445 | и 0438 | й 0439 | к 043A | л 043B | м 043C | н 043D | о 043E |
| Dx | п 043F | я 044F | р 0440 | с 0441 | т 0442 | у 0443 | ж 0436 | в 0432 | ь 044C | ы 044B | з 0437 | ш 0448 | э 044D | щ 0449 | ч 0447 | ъ 044A |
| Ex | Ю 042E | А 0410 | Б 0411 | Ц 0426 | Д 0414 | Е 0415 | Ф 0424 | Г 0413 | Х 0425 | И 0418 | Й 0419 | К 041A | Л 041B | М 041C | Н 041D | О 041E |
| Fx | П 041F | Я 042F | Р 0420 | С 0421 | Т 0422 | У 0423 | Ж 0416 | В 0412 | Ь 042C | Ы 042B | З 0417 | Ш 0428 | Э 042D | Щ 0429 | Ч 0427 | Ъ 042A |

Differences from ISO-IR-111

== KOI8-C/KOI8-CA ==
A variant is KOI8-C, also known as KOI8-CA, is an 8-bit character set. It is a modification of KOI8-F to support Caucasian languages while retaining support in the same languages as KOI8-F. FreeDOS calls it code page 61294. It has hardly ever been used. KOI8-C once referred to what is now known as KOI8-O.

KOI8-C/KOI8-CA (differing rows only)
| | 0 | 1 | 2 | 3 | 4 | 5 | 6 | 7 | 8 | 9 | A | B | C | D | E | F |
| 8x | ғ 0493 | җ 0497 | қ 049B | ҝ 049D | ң 04A3 | ү 04AF | ұ 04B1 | ҳ 04B3 | ҷ 04B7 | ҹ 04B9 | һ 04BB | ▀ 2580 | ә 04D9 | ӣ 04E3 | ө 04E9 | ӯ 04EF |
| 9x | Ғ 0492 | Җ 0496 | Қ 049A | Ҝ 049C | Ң 04A2 | Ү 04AE | Ұ 04B0 | Ҳ 04B2 | Ҷ 04B6 | Ҹ 04B8 | Һ 04BA | ⌡ 2321 | Ә 04D8 | Ӣ 04E2 | Ө 04E8 | Ӯ 04EE |

Differences from KOI8-F

== See also ==
- KOI character encodings
