= KOI8-T =

Single-byte interchange encoding for Tajiki Cyrillic

- Language(s): Tajik Cyrillic, Russian, Bulgarian
- Created by: Michael Davis
- Classification: 8-bit KOI, extended ASCII
- Extends: KOI8-B

KOI8-T is an 8-bit single-byte extended ASCII character encoding adapting KOI8 to cover the Tajik Cyrillic alphabet. It was introduced by Michael Davis as an interim solution for representing Tajiki Cyrillic text in an interchangeable manner appropriate for use on the web, in an attempt to bridge the gap between existing non-interoperable font-specific encodings and the eventual wide adoption of Unicode. It is used by the GNU C Library as its default encoding for Tajik. FreeDOS calls it code page 62318.

The Cyrillic letters that are also used in Russian are encoded according to the KOI8-R layout, making the encoding a KOI8-B superset, whereas the punctuation mostly follows the layout in Windows-1251 and Windows-1252 as applicable.

== Character set ==
KOI8-T
	0	1	2	3	4	5	6	7	8	9	A	B	C	D	E	F
0x																
1x																
2x	SP	!	"	#	$	%	&	'	(	)	*	+	,	-	.	/
3x	0	1	2	3	4	5	6	7	8	9	:	;	<	=	>	?
4x	@	A	B	C	D	E	F	G	H	I	J	K	L	M	N	O
5x	P	Q	R	S	T	U	V	W	X	Y	Z	[	\	]		_
6x	`	a	b	c	d	e	f	g	h	i	j	k	l	m	n	o
7x	p	q	r	s	t	u	v	w	x	y	z	{	|	}	~	
8x	қ 049B	ғ 0493	‚ 201A	Ғ 0492	„ 201E	… 2026	†; 2020	‡ 2021		‰ 2030	ҳ 04B3	‹ 2039	Ҳ 04B2	ҷ 04B7	Ҷ 04B6	
9x	Қ 049A	‘ 2018	’ 2019	“ 201C	” 201D	• 2022	– 2013	— 2014		™ 2122		› 203A				
Ax		ӯ 04EF	Ӯ 04EE	ё 0451	¤	ӣ 04E3	¦	§				«	¬	SHY	®	
Bx	°	±	²	Ё 0401		Ӣ 04E2	¶	·		№ 2116		»				© 00A9
Cx	ю 044E	а 0430	б 0431	ц 0446	д 0434	е 0435	ф 0444	г 0433	х 0445	и 0438	й 0439	к 043A	л 043B	м 043C	н 043D	о 043E
Dx	п 043F	я 044F	р 0440	с 0441	т 0442	у 0443	ж 0436	в 0432	ь 044C	ы 044B	з 0437	ш 0448	э 044D	щ 0449	ч 0447	ъ 044A
Ex	Ю 042E	А 0410	Б 0411	Ц 0426	Д 0414	Е 0415	Ф 0424	Г 0413	Х 0425	И 0418	Й 0419	К 041A	Л 041B	М 041C	Н 041D	О 041E
Fx	П 041F	Я 042F	Р 0420	С 0421	Т 0422	У 0423	Ж 0416	В 0412	Ь 042C	Ы 042B	З 0417	Ш 0428	Э 042D	Щ 0429	Ч 0427	Ъ 042A

== See also ==
- Mac OS Turkic Cyrillic, encodes Tajik amongst other languages.
