= ISO-IR-111 =

Formerly ECMA-standard multilingual KOI-8 character encoding version

KOI8-E (1986)
- Alias(es): ISO-IR-111
- Language(s): Russian, Belarusian, Macedonian, Serbian, Ukrainian (partial)
- Standard: ECMA-113:1986
- Classification: Extended ASCII, KOI
- Extends: KOI8-B
- Succeeded by: ECMA-113:1988 (ISO-8859-5)
- Other related encoding(s): KOI8-F

ISO-IR-111 or KOI8-E is an 8-bit character set. It is a multinational extension of KOI-8 for Belarusian, Macedonian, Serbian, and Ukrainian (except Ґґ which is added to KOI8-F). The name "ISO-IR-111" refers to its registration number in the ISO-IR registry, and denotes it as a set usable with ISO/IEC 2022.

It was defined by the first (1986) edition of ECMA-113, which is the Ecma International standard corresponding to ISO/IEC 8859-5, and as such also corresponds to a 1987 draft version of ISO-8859-5. The published editions of ISO/IEC 8859-5 instead correspond to subsequent editions of ECMA-113, which defines a different encoding.

== Naming confusion ==
ISO-IR-111, the 1985 edition of ECMA-113 (also called "ECMA-Cyrillic" or "KOI8-E"), was based on the 1974 edition of GOST 19768 (i.e. KOI-8). In 1987 ECMA-113 was redesigned. These newer editions of ECMA-113 are equivalent to ISO-8859-5, and do not follow the KOI layout. This confusion has led to a common misconception that ISO-8859-5 was defined in or based on GOST 19768-74.

Possibly as another consequence of this, RFC 1345 erroneously lists a different codepage under the names "ISO-IR-111" and "ECMA-Cyrillic", resembling ISO-8859-5 with re-ordered rows, and partially compatible with Windows-1251. Due to concerns that existing implementations might use the RFC 1345 definition for those two labels, it was proposed that the IANA additionally recognise KOI8-E as a label for ECMA-113:1985 content, and the IANA presently lists that label as an alias.

== Character set ==
The following table shows the ISO-IR-111 encoding. Each character is shown with its equivalent Unicode code point.

ISO-IR-111
	0	1	2	3	4	5	6	7	8	9	A	B	C	D	E	F
0x																
1x																
2x	SP	!	"	#	$	%	&	'	(	)	*	+	,	-	.	/
3x	0	1	2	3	4	5	6	7	8	9	:	;	<	=	>	?
4x	@	A	B	C	D	E	F	G	H	I	J	K	L	M	N	O
5x	P	Q	R	S	T	U	V	W	X	Y	Z	[	\	]		_
6x	`	a	b	c	d	e	f	g	h	i	j	k	l	m	n	o
7x	p	q	r	s	t	u	v	w	x	y	z	{	|	}	~	
8x																
9x																
Ax	NBSP	ђ 0452	ѓ 0453	ё 0451	є 0454	ѕ 0455	і 0456	ї 0457	ј 0458	љ 0459	њ 045A	ћ 045B	ќ 045C	SHY	ў 045E	џ 045F
Bx	№ 2116	Ђ 0402	Ѓ 0403	Ё 0401	Є 0404	Ѕ 0405	І 0406	Ї 0407	Ј 0408	Љ 0409	Њ 040A	Ћ 040B	Ќ 040C	¤ 00A4	Ў 040E	Џ 040F
Cx	ю 044E	а 0430	б 0431	ц 0446	д 0434	е 0435	ф 0444	г 0433	х 0445	и 0438	й 0439	к 043A	л 043B	м 043C	н 043D	о 043E
Dx	п 043F	я 044F	р 0440	с 0441	т 0442	у 0443	ж 0436	в 0432	ь 044C	ы 044B	з 0437	ш 0448	э 044D	щ 0449	ч 0447	ъ 044A
Ex	Ю 042E	А 0410	Б 0411	Ц 0426	Д 0414	Е 0415	Ф 0424	Г 0413	Х 0425	И 0418	Й 0419	К 041A	Л 041B	М 041C	Н 041D	О 041E
Fx	П 041F	Я 042F	Р 0420	С 0421	Т 0422	У 0423	Ж 0416	В 0412	Ь 042C	Ы 042B	З 0417	Ш 0428	Э 042D	Щ 0429	Ч 0427	Ъ 042A

== Extended and modified versions ==
A modified version named KOI8 Unified or KOI8-F was used in software produced by Fingertip Software, adding the Ґ in its KOI8-U location (replacing the soft hyphen and displacing the universal currency sign), and adding some graphical characters in the C1 control codes area, mainly from KOI8-R and Windows-1251.

== Incorrect RFC 1345 code page ==
RFC 1345's "ECMA-Cyrillic"
- Language(s): Russian, Belarusian, Macedonian, Serbian
- Standard: RFC 1345
- Classification: Extended ASCII
- Transforms / Encodes: ISO-IR-111
- Other related encoding(s): ISO-8859-5, Windows-1251

RFC 1345 erroneously lists a different code page under the name ISO-IR-111, encoding the same Cyrillic characters but with a different layout. It resembles a mixture of Windows-1251 and ISO-8859-5. Specifically, line A_ corresponds to ISO-8859-5, lines C_ through F_ correspond to Windows-1251 (equivalent to lines B_ through E_ of ISO-8859-5), and line B_ nearly corresponds to line F_ of ISO-8859-5, with the exception of the § being replaced with a ¤.

Certain codes resemble ISO-IR-111 with flipped letter case, which may have contributed to the confusion. The majority differ and are shown below.

Code page erroneously labelled "ISO-IR-111" or "ECMA-Cyrillic" in RFC 1345
	0	1	2	3	4	5	6	7	8	9	A	B	C	D	E	F
Ax	NBSP	Ё	Ђ	Ѓ	Є	Ѕ	І	Ї	Ј	Љ	Њ	Ћ	Ќ	SHY	Ў	Џ
Bx	№	ё	ђ	ѓ	є	ѕ	і	ї	ј	љ	њ	ћ	ќ	¤	ў	џ
Cx	А	Б	В	Г	Д	Е	Ж	З	И	Й	К	Л	М	Н	О	П
Dx	Р	С	Т	У	Ф	Х	Ц	Ч	Ш	Щ	Ъ	Ы	Ь	Э	Ю	Я
Ex	а	б	в	г	д	е	ж	з	и	й	к	л	м	н	о	п
Fx	р	с	т	у	ф	х	ц	ч	ш	щ	ъ	ы	ь	э	ю	я

Deviating from ISO-IR-111 (excluding deviations in case only)

== See also ==
- KOI character encodings
