= KOI8-RU =

8-bit Character encoding

- Language(s): Belarusian, Ukrainian, Russian, Bulgarian
- Classification: 8-bit KOI, extended ASCII
- Extends: KOI8-B
- Based on: KOI8-U, KOI8-R
- Other related encoding(s): KOI8-E, KOI8-F

KOI8-RU is an 8-bit character encoding, designed to cover Russian, Ukrainian, and Belarusian which use a Cyrillic alphabet. It is closely related to KOI8-R, which covers Russian and Bulgarian, but replaces ten box drawing characters with five Ukrainian and Belarusian letters Ґ, Є, І, Ї, and Ў in both upper case and lower case. It is even more closely related to KOI8-U, which does not include Ў but otherwise makes the same letter replacements. The additional letter allocations are matched by KOI8-E, except for Ґ which is added to KOI8-F.

In IBM, KOI8-RU is assigned code page/CCSID 1167.

KOI8 remains much more commonly used than ISO 8859-5, which never really caught on. Another common Cyrillic character encoding is Windows-1251. In the future, both may eventually give way to Unicode.

KOI8 stands for Kod obmena informatsiey, 8 bit (Russian: Код обмена информацией, 8 бит) which means "Code for Information Exchange, 8 bit".

The KOI8 character sets have the property that the Russian Cyrillic letters are in pseudo-Roman order rather than the natural Cyrillic alphabetical order as in ISO 8859-5. Although this may seem unnatural, it has the useful property that if the eighth bit is stripped, the text can still be read (or at least deciphered) in case-reversed transliteration on an ordinary ASCII terminal. For instance, "Код Обмена Информацией" in KOI8-RU becomes kOD oBMENA iNFORMACIEJ (the Russian meaning of the "KOI" acronym) if the 8th bit is stripped.

== Character set ==
The following table shows the KOI8-RU encoding. Each character is shown with its equivalent Unicode code point.

KOI8-RU
	0	1	2	3	4	5	6	7	8	9	A	B	C	D	E	F
0x																
1x																
2x	SP	!	"	#	$	%	&	'	(	)	*	+	,	-	.	/
3x	0	1	2	3	4	5	6	7	8	9	:	;	<	=	>	?
4x	@	A	B	C	D	E	F	G	H	I	J	K	L	M	N	O
5x	P	Q	R	S	T	U	V	W	X	Y	Z	[	\	]		_
6x	`	a	b	c	d	e	f	g	h	i	j	k	l	m	n	o
7x	p	q	r	s	t	u	v	w	x	y	z	{	|	}	~	
8x	─ 2500	│ 2502	┌ 250C	┐ 2510	└ 2514	┘ 2518	├ 251C	┤ 2524	┬ 252C	┴ 2534	┼ 253C	▀ 2580	▄ 2584	█ 2588	▌ 258C	▐ 2590
9x	░ 2591	▒ 2592	▓ 2593	“ (Note: Changed relative to KOI8-R to match Windows-1251.); 201C	■ 25A0	∙ 2219	” 201D	— 2014	№ 2116	™ 2122	NBSP	» 00BB	® 00AE	« 00AB	· 00B7	¤ 00A4
Ax	═ 2550	║ 2551	╒ 2552	ё 0451	є (Note: Changed relative to KOI8-R to match KOI8-U.) (Note: Changed relative to KOI8-R to match KOI8-E.); 0454	╔ 2554	і 0456	ї 0457	╗ 2557	╘ 2558	╙ 2559	╚ 255A	╛ 255B	ґ 0491	ў 045E	╞ 255E
Bx	╟ 255F	╠ 2560	╡ 2561	Ё 0401	Є 0404	╣ 2563	І 0406	Ї 0407	╦ 2566	╧ 2567	╨ 2568	╩ 2569	╪ 256A	Ґ 0490	Ў 040E	© 00A9
Cx	ю 044E	а 0430	б 0431	ц 0446	д 0434	е 0435	ф 0444	г 0433	х 0445	и 0438	й 0439	к 043A	л 043B	м 043C	н 043D	о 043E
Dx	п 043F	я 044F	р 0440	с 0441	т 0442	у 0443	ж 0436	в 0432	ь 044C	ы 044B	з 0437	ш 0448	э 044D	щ 0449	ч 0447	ъ 044A
Ex	Ю 042E	А 0410	Б 0411	Ц 0426	Д 0414	Е 0415	Ф 0424	Г 0413	Х 0425	И 0418	Й 0419	К 041A	Л 041B	М 041C	Н 041D	О 041E
Fx	П 041F	Я 042F	Р 0420	С 0421	Т 0422	У 0423	Ж 0416	В 0412	Ь 042C	Ы 042B	З 0417	Ш 0428	Э 042D	Щ 0429	Ч 0427	Ъ 042A

Differences from KOI8-R

Although RFC 2319 says that character 0x95 should be U+2219 (∙), it may also be U+2022 (•) to match the bullet character in Windows-1251.

Some references have a typo and incorrectly state that character 0xB4 is U+0403, rather than the correct U+0404. This typo is present in Appendix A of RFC 2319 (but the table in the main text of the RFC gives the correct mapping).

== See also ==
- KOI character encodings
