= KOI8-B =

Common subset of KOI-8 Cyrillic character encoding variants

- Languages: Russian, Bulgarian
- Classification: 8-bit KOI, extended ASCII
- Extends: KOI-8
- Extensions: KOI8-R, KOI8-U, KOI8-RU, KOI8-E, KOI8-F, KOI8-T
- Succeeded by: ISO-IR-153

KOI8-B is the informal name for an 8-bit Roman / Cyrillic character set constituting the common subset of the major KOI-8 variants (KOI8-R, KOI8-U, KOI8-RU, KOI8-E, KOI8-F). Accordingly, it is closely related to KOI8-R, but defines only the letter subset in the upper half. As such it was implemented by some font vendors for PC Unixes like Xenix in the late 1980s.

== Character set ==
The following table shows the KOI8-B encoding. Each character is shown with its equivalent Unicode code point.

KOI8-B
	0	1	2	3	4	5	6	7	8	9	A	B	C	D	E	F
0x																
1x																
2x	SP	!	"	#	$	%	&	'	(	)	*	+	,	-	.	/
3x	0	1	2	3	4	5	6	7	8	9	:	;	<	=	>	?
4x	@	A	B	C	D	E	F	G	H	I	J	K	L	M	N	O
5x	P	Q	R	S	T	U	V	W	X	Y	Z	[	\	]		_
6x	`	a	b	c	d	e	f	g	h	i	j	k	l	m	n	o
7x	p	q	r	s	t	u	v	w	x	y	z	{	|	}	~	
8x																
9x																
Ax				ё 0451												
Bx				Ё 0401												
Cx	ю 044E	а 0430	б 0431	ц 0446	д 0434	е 0435	ф 0444	г 0433	х 0445	и 0438	й 0439	к 043A	л 043B	м 043C	н 043D	о 043E
Dx	п 043F	я 044F	р 0440	с 0441	т 0442	у 0443	ж 0436	в 0432	ь 044C	ы 044B	з 0437	ш 0448	э 044D	щ 0449	ч 0447	ъ 044A
Ex	Ю 042E	А 0410	Б 0411	Ц 0426	Д 0414	Е 0415	Ф 0424	Г 0413	Х 0425	И 0418	Й 0419	К 041A	Л 041B	М 041C	Н 041D	О 041E
Fx	П 041F	Я 042F	Р 0420	С 0421	Т 0422	У 0423	Ж 0416	В 0412	Ь 042C	Ы 042B	З 0417	Ш 0428	Э 042D	Щ 0429	Ч 0427	Ъ 042A

== See also ==
- KOI character encodings
