= U with macron =

U with macron may refer to:

- U with macron (Cyrillic) (Ӯ, ӯ), a Carpatho-Rusyn, Tajik, Kildin Sami, and Western Siberia letter
- Ū, U with macron, a Latvian, Lithuanian, Livonian, and Samogitian letter, also used in Marshallese; also used in Japanese to mark a long U, and in Pinyin to indicate the high level tone of Mandarin Chinese
