= U with macron (Cyrillic) =

Cyrillic letter

Usage
- Writing system: Cyrillic
- Type: Alphabetic
- Sound values: [ɵ] [u] [y]

Long U or U with macron (Ӯ ӯ; italics: Ӯ ӯ) is a letter of the Cyrillic script, derived from the Cyrillic letter U (У у У у).

== Usage ==
U with macron is used in the alphabet of the Tajik language, where it represents the close-mid central rounded vowel, /ɵ/. Accordingly, although the letter shape is a modification of ⟨У⟩, the only aspect of the sound shared with /u/ is that both are relatively close, rounded vowels.

In 1937, it was also proposed for use in the Karelian Cyrillic alphabet to represent /y/, but was not adopted.

U with macron is used to represent long /u/ in Kildin Sami and Mansi, two Uralic languages spoken on the Kola Peninsula (Kildin) and Western Siberia (Mansi). In these languages, length is distinctive, and the macron is used to mark the long version of all the vowels.

U with macron is also used in the Aleut language (Bering dialect). It is the thirty-sixth letter of the modern Aleut alphabet.

U with macron is also used in Carpatho-Rusyn, the only Slavic language to do so. Its sound is close to /y/, or in some dialects, /u/.

== Computing codes ==
Character information
| Preview | Ӯ | | ӯ | |
|---|---|---|---|---|
| Unicode name | CYRILLIC CAPITAL LETTER; U WITH MACRON | | CYRILLIC SMALL LETTER; U WITH MACRON | |
| Encodings | decimal | hex | dec | hex |
| Unicode | 1262 | U+04EE | 1263 | U+04EF |
| UTF-8 | 211 174 | D3 AE | 211 175 | D3 AF |
| Numeric character reference | &#1262; | &#x4EE; | &#1263; | &#x4EF; |

== See also ==
- U u : Latin letter U
- Ū ū : Latin letter U with macron - a Latvian, Latgalian, Lithuanian, Livonian, and Samogitian letter
- Y y : Latin letter Y
- Ȳ ȳ : Latin letter Y with macron - a similar looking letter
- Ў ў : Cyrillic letter Short U
- Ӱ ӱ : Cyrillic letter U with diaeresis
- Ӳ ӳ : Cyrillic letter U with double acute
- Ү ү : Cyrillic letter straight U
- Ұ ұ : Cyrillic letter Straight U with stroke
- Cyrillic characters in Unicode
