= KOI character encodings =

Family of several code pages for the Cyrillic script

KOI (Russian: КОИ, from код обмена информацией, kod obmena informatsiey, 'code for information exchange') is a family of several code pages for the Cyrillic script.

A particular feature of the KOI code pages is that the text remains human-readable when the leftmost bit is stripped, should it inadvertently pass through equipment or software that can only deal with 7 bit wide characters. This is due to characters being placed in a special order (128 codepoints apart from the Latin letter they sound most similar to), which, however, does not correspond to the alphabetic order in any language that is written in Cyrillic and necessitates the use of lookup tables to perform sorting.

These encodings are derived from ASCII on the base of some correspondence between Latin and Cyrillic (nearly phonetical), which was already used in Russian dialect of Morse code and in MTK-2 telegraph code. The first 26 characters from А (0xE1) in KOI8-R are А, Б, Ц, Д, Е, Ф, Г, Х, И, Й, К, Л, М, Н, О, П, Я, Р, С, Т, У, Ж, В, Ь, Ы, З.

== KOI-7 ==
The original KOI encoding (1967) was a 7-bit code page named KOI-7 (КОИ-7), which did not contain lowercase letters. In KOI-7, the codes of the 31 or 32 Russian letters are ordered according to the Latin letters. Other code points are the same as in ASCII (however, the dollar sign $ (code point 24_{hex}) may be replaced by the universal currency sign ¤).

== KOI-8 ==
KOI-8 (КОИ-8), standardized in 1974 as GOST 19768, is an 8-bit extension of ASCII. Originally it only included 32 lowercase and 31 uppercase Russian letters.

Later derivatives of KOI-8 constitute the family of encodings variously known as KOI8, KOI 8 and KOI-8.

The family members are:

- KOI8-B (with Ёё and Ъ)
- KOI8-R / KOI8-RUSSIA for Russian and Bulgarian (RFC 1489). (Code page 878)
- KOI8-U / KOI8-UKRAINE for Ukrainian (RFC 2319). (Code page 1168)
- KOI8-RU for Ukrainian, Belarusian and Russian. (Code page 1167)
- KOI8-T for Tajik. (FreeDOS Code page 62318)
- KOI8-C, also KOI8-CA, a proposal for Caucasus and Central Asia; hardly ever been used. (FreeDOS Code page 61294)
- ISO-IR-111 / KOI8-E (ECMA-113 (1st ed., 1986), multilingual for Slavic languages).
- KOI8-F, KOI-8 Unified. Includes the letter allocations from both KOI8-U and KOI8-E, with a subset of the pseudographics from KOI8-R. (FreeDOS Code page 60270)
- KOI8-K1 "Cyrillic-1" (defined in CSN 36 9103, ST SEV 358–88)
- KOI8-O (formerly KOI8-C) for Old Russian orthography. (FreeDOS Code page 63342)

Additionally, GOST R 34.303-92 defines "KOI-8 V1" which is ISO-IR-153, and "KOI-8 N1" and "KOI-8 N2" which are variants of Code page 866. These do not follow the KOI-8 layout.

== DKOI ==
DKOI is an EBCDIC-based encoding used in ES EVM mainframes. It has been defined by several standards: GOST 19768-74 / ST SEV 358–76, ST SEV 358-88 / GOST 19768–93, CSN 36 9103.

There are two variants:

- DKOI K1 (ДКОИ К1), each Cyrillic letter is given its own code point.
- DKOI K2 (ДКОИ К2), some Cyrillic letters (А, В, Е, К, М, Н, О, Р, С, Т, Х, а, е, о, р, с, у, х) are merged with visually identical Latin letters.

== Latin variants ==
Some encodings are called KOI, but define Latin alphabets:

- KOI8-CS / KOI8-CS2 for Czech and Slovak (ČSN (Czech technical standard) 369103, devised by the Comecon. This encoded Latin with diacritics, as used in Czech and Slovak, rather than Cyrillic, but the basic idea was the same - text should remain legible with the 8-th bit cleared, thus e.g. Č became C etc.).
- KOI8-L2 "Latin-2" (defined in CSN 36 9103), ISO IR 139 (almost identical to ISO 8859-2 (1987), but has the dollar sign and currency sign swapped)
- DKOI CS2 (defined in CSN 36 9103)
- DKOI L2 (defined in CSN 36 9103)
