= KOI8-R =

Character encoding

- Alias(es): cp878 (code page 878)
- Languages: Russian, Bulgarian
- Classification: 8-bit KOI, extended ASCII
- Extends: KOI8-B
- Based on: KOI-8
- Other related encodings: KOI8-U, KOI8-RU

KOI8-R (RFC 1489) is an 8-bit character encoding derived from the KOI-8 encoding, created by the programmer Andrei Chernov in 1993. It was designed to encode Russian letters, using the Russian subset of a Cyrillic script. KOI-8 is an extension of the KOI-7 encoding, which inherited a phonetic correspondence of Russian, as well as Latin letters, from the MTK-2 teletype code. As a result, Russian Cyrillic letters in KOI8-R are in a pseudo-Latin alphabetical order, rather than a Cyrillic one, as in ISO 8859-5. This means that if the 8th bit is stripped, the text remains partially readable in any ASCII-based encoding (including KOI8-R itself) as a case-reversed transliteration. For example, "Код для обмена и обработки информации" (the Russian meaning of the "KOI" acronym) becomes: "kOD DLQ OBMENA I OBRABOTKI INFORMACII".

KOI-8 stands for: 8-bitnyy kod dlya obmena i obrabotki informatsii (Russian: 8-битный код для обмена и обработки информации), meaning "8-Bit Code for Information Interchange". In Microsoft Windows, KOI8-R is assigned the code page number 20866. In IBM, KOI8-R is assigned code page 878. KOI8-R also covers the Bulgarian alphabet.

It lacks proper quotation marks for both the Russian «...» and the Bulgarian „...“. Windows-1251 does support these among other, additional letters and has thus become more popular. KOI8-R is used by less than 0.004% of websites, with the majority in Russia and Bulgaria. Unicode and UTF-8 are preferred to single-byte Cyrillic encodings in modern applications.

== Character set ==
The following table shows the KOI8-R encoding. Each character is shown with its equivalent Unicode code point.

KOI8-R
	0	1	2	3	4	5	6	7	8	9	A	B	C	D	E	F
0x																
1x																
2x	SP	!	"	#	$	%	&	'	(	)	*	+	,	-	.	/
3x	0	1	2	3	4	5	6	7	8	9	:	;	<	=	>	?
4x	@	A	B	C	D	E	F	G	H	I	J	K	L	M	N	O
5x	P	Q	R	S	T	U	V	W	X	Y	Z	[	\	]		_
6x	`	a	b	c	d	e	f	g	h	i	j	k	l	m	n	o
7x	p	q	r	s	t	u	v	w	x	y	z	{	|	}	~	
8x	─ 2500	│ 2502	┌ 250C	┐ 2510	└ 2514	┘ 2518	├ 251C	┤ 2524	┬ 252C	┴ 2534	┼ 253C	▀ 2580	▄ 2584	█ 2588	▌ 258C	▐ 2590
9x	░ 2591	▒ 2592	▓ 2593	⌠ 2320	■ 25A0	∙ 2219	√ 221A	≈ 2248	≤ 2264	≥ 2265	NBSP	⌡ 2321	° 00B0	² 00B2	· 00B7	÷ 00F7
Ax	═ 2550	║ 2551	╒ 2552	ё 0451	╓ 2553	╔ 2554	╕ 2555	╖ 2556	╗ 2557	╘ 2558	╙ 2559	╚ 255A	╛ 255B	╜ 255C	╝ 255D	╞ 255E
Bx	╟ 255F	╠ 2560	╡ 2561	Ё 0401	╢ 2562	╣ 2563	╤ 2564	╥ 2565	╦ 2566	╧ 2567	╨ 2568	╩ 2569	╪ 256A	╫ 256B	╬ 256C	© 00A9
Cx	ю 044E	а 0430	б 0431	ц 0446	д 0434	е 0435	ф 0444	г 0433	х 0445	и 0438	й 0439	к 043A	л 043B	м 043C	н 043D	о 043E
Dx	п 043F	я 044F	р 0440	с 0441	т 0442	у 0443	ж 0436	в 0432	ь 044C	ы 044B	з 0437	ш 0448	э 044D	щ 0449	ч 0447	ъ 044A
Ex	Ю 042E	А 0410	Б 0411	Ц 0426	Д 0414	Е 0415	Ф 0424	Г 0413	Х 0425	И 0418	Й 0419	К 041A	Л 041B	М 041C	Н 041D	О 041E
Fx	П 041F	Я 042F	Р 0420	С 0421	Т 0422	У 0423	Ж 0416	В 0412	Ь 042C	Ы 042B	З 0417	Ш 0428	Э 042D	Щ 0429	Ч 0427	Ъ 042A

== See also ==
- KOI8-B, a derivation of KOI8-R with only the letter subset implemented
- KOI8-U, another derivative encoding which adds Ukrainian characters
- KOI character encodings
- RELCOM
- Windows-1251, another common Cyrillic character encoding
