= Kazakh Short U =

Cyrillic letter used for /ʊ/ in Kazakh

Kazakh Straight U
- Ұ ұ

Usage
- Writing system: Cyrillic
- Type: Alphabetic
- Language of origin: Kazakh Cyrillic
- Sound values: [ʊ]
- In Unicode: U+04B0, U+04B1

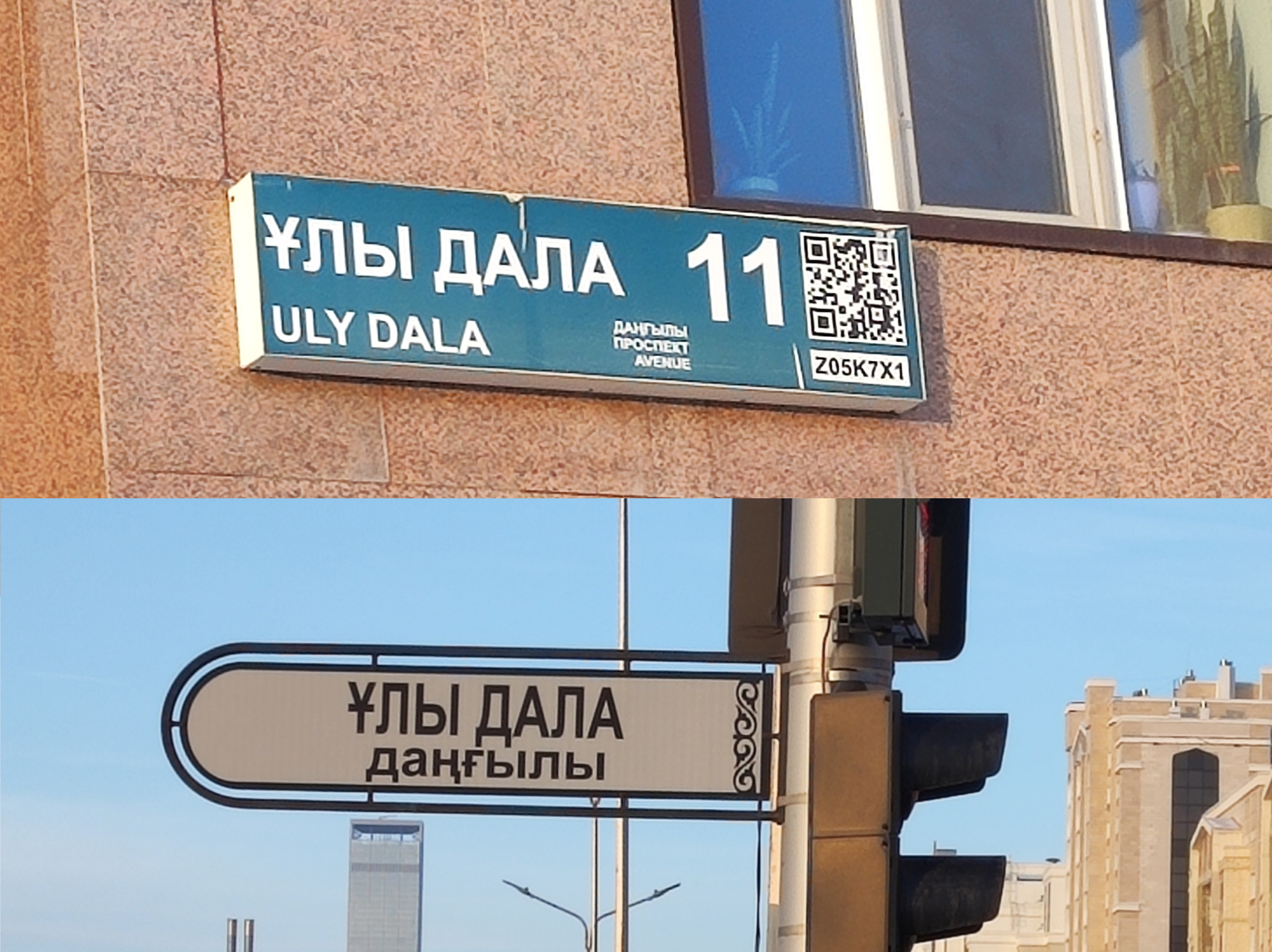
Collage of two street signs in Kazakh, both featuring the letter Ұ

Khazakh Short U (Ұ ұ; italics: Ұ ұ), is a letter of the Cyrillic script. In Unicode, this letter is called "Straight U with stroke". Its form is the Cyrillic letter Ue (Ү ү Ү ү) with a horizontal stroke through it.

== Usage ==
Kazakh Short U is used only in the alphabet of the Kazakh language, where it represents the near-close near-back rounded vowel /ʊ/, like the pronunciation of the ⟨oo⟩ in "book". In other circumstances, it is used as a replacement for the former letter to represent the close front rounded vowel /y/ in situations where it would be easily confused with Cyrillic У у. It is romanized as ⟨ū⟩ in Kazakh (2021 reform).

== Unicode ==
Character information
Preview	Ұ		ұ	
Unicode name	CYRILLIC CAPITAL LETTER; STRAIGHT U WITH STROKE		CYRILLIC SMALL LETTER; STRAIGHT U WITH STROKE	
Encodings	decimal	hex	dec	hex
Unicode	1200	U+04B0	1201	U+04B1
UTF-8	210 176	D2 B0	210 177	D2 B1
Numeric character reference	&#1200;	&#x4B0;	&#1201;	&#x4B1;
KZ-1048	162	A2	163	A3
Mac OS Turkic Cyrillic	173	AD	214	D6
KOI8-C/KOI8-CA	150	96	134	86
Code page 58152	246	F6	247	F7

== See also ==
- Ú ú : Latin letter Ú
- У у : Cyrillic letter U
- У́ у́ : Cyrillic letter U with acute
- Ў ў : Cyrillic letter short U
- Ү ү : Cyrillic letter Ue (straight U)
- Cyrillic characters in Unicode
- ¥ (Japanese yen or Chinese yuan)
- Ɏ (Latin letter Y with stroke)
