= Currency sign (generic) =

Glyph to denote an unspecified currency

¤

Currency sign
- In Unicode: U+00A4 ¤ CURRENCY SIGN (&curren;)

The currency sign ¤ is a character used to denote an unspecified currency. It can be described as a circle the size of a lowercase character with four short radiating arms at 45° (northeast), 135° (southeast), 225° (southwest) and 315° (northwest). It is raised slightly above the baseline. The character is sometimes called scarab.

The symbol may be seen in technical documentation, such as those for programming languages (e.g., Java's DecimalFormat), to represent any arbitrary currency. This invites the reader to (mentally) substitute their local symbol when reading.

== History ==
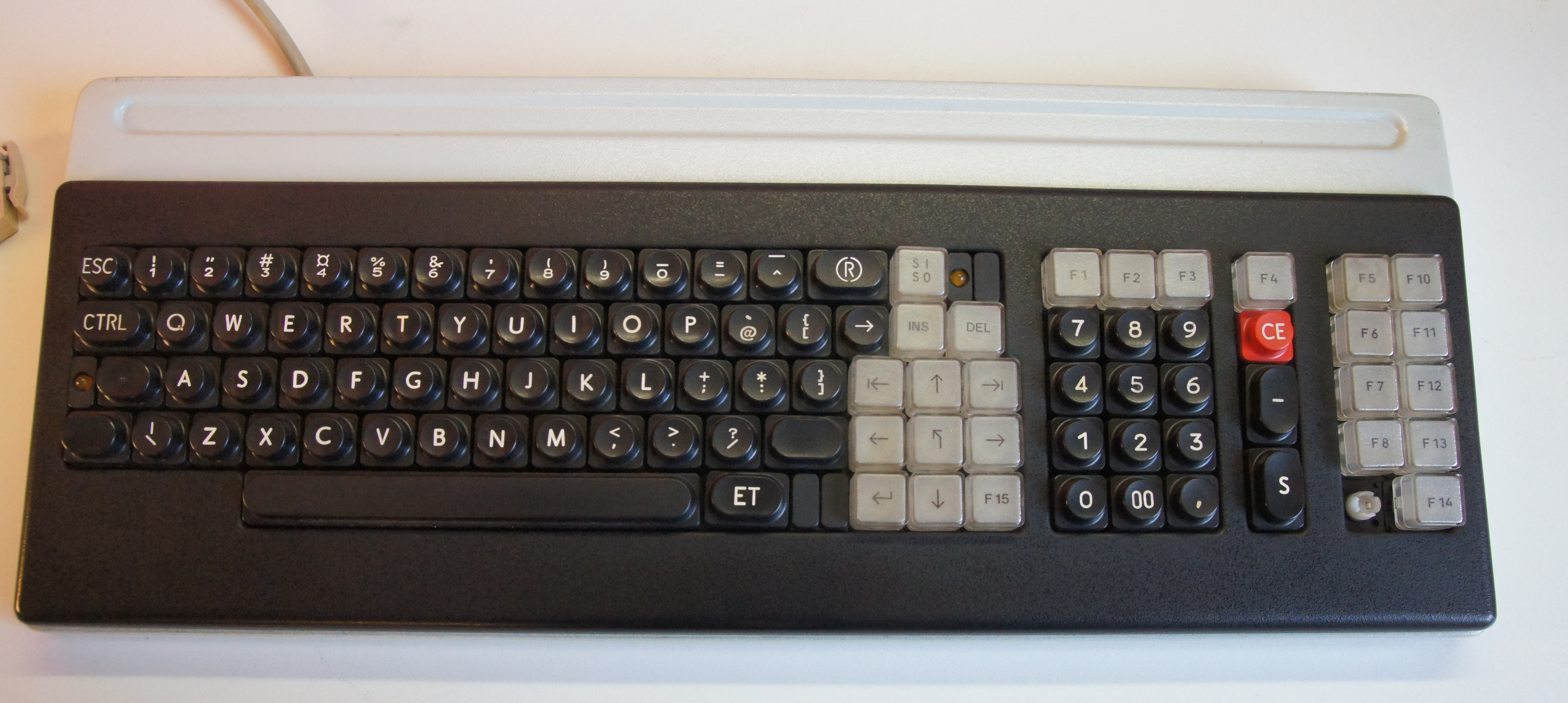
Symbol ¤ on a keyboard (on the 4 key)

The symbol was first encoded for computers in 1972, as a placeholder for the relevant national currency symbol (such as the $, £ or ¥), in the respective national variant of ASCII (ISO/IEC 646) and the International Reference Variant. It was proposed by Italy as an alternative to the dollar sign at code point 36 = 0x24. In reality, most national standards retained the dollar sign as too important, and, because ASCII and ISO 646 were specified as 7-bit encoding (which allowed for just 96 printable characters and 32 control codes), the proposal did not succeed. The character is used in the GSM default 7-bit encoding as specified in 3GPP TS 23.038 / GSM 03.38 at code point 0x24.

The introduction of 8-bit encoding and the ISO/IEC 8859 code pages meant that all major national currency symbols (in use at the time) could be allocated a unique codepoint. When ISO 8859 was standardized, this symbol was placed at code point 0xA4 in the Latin, Arabic, and Hebrew character sets. The Cyrillic set included it in early drafts, but it was removed in the published version in favour of including the section sign, §, (Note: ISO-9959-5 was adopted from ECMA-113, beginning with ECMA-113's 1988 edition, although a superseded draft of ISO-8859-5 (DIS-8859-5:1987) did exist following the 1986 edition of ECMA-113. Although the 1988 edition and the 1986 edition (KOI8-E) of ECMA-113 have very different layouts, their repertoires are very similar, differing only in that the 1986 edition has a universal currency sign and the 1988 edition has a section sign.) and it was not included in all later added Latin sets. In Soviet computer systems (usually using some variant of KOI character set) this symbol was placed at the code point used by the dollar sign in ASCII.

ISO Latin 9 reallocated 0xA4 (the code point originally allocated to this symbol) to the euro sign (€) but, although accepted by Apple and the Unix community, this standard failed to gain significant acceptance given the dominance at the time of Microsoft's Windows-1252 code page (which had placed the euro sign at 0x80 in the reserved area). In the modern era, the Unicode standard gives each of the major currency symbols – and this one – its own unique and device-independent code point, with implementation (or lack of) left to font designers.

== Other uses ==
The symbol is used as a non-printing "end of cell" marker for tables in Microsoft Word.

== Further details about encoding ==
It is represented in Unicode as U+00A4 ¤ CURRENCY SIGN (&curren;).

The currency sign was once a part of the standard character sets used by Apple, Microsoft and Unix but, when the euro was introduced in 1999, a new codepoint was needed in already crowded character sets for the new euro sign (€). Apple and many Unix vendors changed the symbol at 0xA4 to €. However, Microsoft retained the generic currency sign at 0xA4 and introduced the euro sign as a new code point, at 0x80 in the little used (by Microsoft) control-code space 0x80 to 0x9F. The dispute resolved itself as vendors migrated to Unicode (which gives the euro a unique code point, U+20AC € EURO SIGN).

== Keyboard entry ==
The symbol is available on some keyboard layouts, for example, French, Danish, Norwegian, Swedish, Finnish, Estonian, Slovak and Hungarian.

Additional keyboard shortcuts include:

- AltGr (or right Alt)+4 with the US-International layout on Windows and ChromeOS
- Composeox on Linux
- Decimal or hexadecimal Unicode input

In LaTeX, the textcomp package provides the \textcurrency command to produce this character.

== See also ==
- XXX (currency) (ISO 4217 code for no specific currency)
- Square lozenge (⌑)
