= Ue (Cyrillic) =

Cyrillic letter

- Ү ү

Usage
- Writing system: Cyrillic
- Type: Alphabetic
- Sound values: [y], [ʏ], [u]

History
Development
T3
        - Υ υ
          - Ү ү

Ue or Straight U (Ү ү; italics: Ү ү) is a letter of the Cyrillic script. It is a form of the Cyrillic letter U (У у У у) with a vertical, rather than diagonal, center line. Whereas a standard Cyrillic U resembles a lowercase Latin y, Ue instead uses the shape of a capital Latin Y, with each letter set higher or lower to establish its case. The lower case resembles the lower case of the Greek letter gamma.

Ue is in used the alphabets of the Tuvan, Bashkir, Buryat, Kalmyk, Kazakh, Kyrgyz, Mongolian, Sakha, Turkmen, Tatar, Azerbajiani and other languages. It commonly represents the front rounded vowels /y/ and /ʏ/ in most Turkic languages, except in Mongolian where it represents /u/.

In Tuvan and Kyrgyz the Cyrillic letter can be written as a double vowel.

== Computing codes ==
Character information
Preview	Ү		ү	
Unicode name	CYRILLIC CAPITAL LETTER; STRAIGHT U		CYRILLIC SMALL LETTER; STRAIGHT U	
Encodings	decimal	hex	dec	hex
Unicode	1198	U+04AE	1199	U+04AF
UTF-8	210 174	D2 AE	210 175	D2 AF
Numeric character reference	&#1198;	&#x4AE;	&#1199;	&#x4AF;

== See also ==
- Ü ü : Latin letter U with diaeresis, used in the Azerbaijani, Estonian, German, Hungarian, Turkish, and Turkmen languages.
- Ư ư : Latin letter U with horn, used in Vietnamese alphabet
- Y y : Latin letter Y
- У у : Cyrillic letter U
- Ӱ ӱ : Cyrillic letter U with diaeresis
- Ӳ ӳ : Cyrillic letter U with double acute
- Ұ ұ : Cyrillic letter straight U with stroke (Kazakh mid U)
- Γ γ : Greek letter Gamma
- Cyrillic characters in Unicode
