= Dotted I (Cyrillic) =

Cyrillic letter

Dotted i
- І і

Usage
- Writing system: Cyrillic
- Type: Alphabetic
- Sound values: [i], [ɪ], [ɘ]

History
Development
D36
          - Ι ι
            - І і
- Transliterations: I i

Other
- Associated numbers: 10 (Cyrillic numerals)

The dotted і (І і; italics: І і), also called decimal i (after its former numeric value) or soft-dotted i, is a letter of the Cyrillic script. It commonly represents the close front unrounded vowel /i/, like the pronunciation of ⟨i⟩ in English "machine". It is used in the orthographies of Belarusian, Kazakh, Khakas, Komi, Carpathian Rusyn and Ukrainian and quite often, but not always, is the equivalent of the Cyrillic letter і (И и) as used in Russian and other languages. It was also used in Russian before the spelling reform of 1918.

In Ukrainian, the dotted і is the twelfth letter of the alphabet and represents the sound [i] in writing. Ukrainian uses и to represent the sound [ɪ]. In Belarusian, the dotted i is the tenth letter of the alphabet. It represents [i]. The two Carpathian Rusyn standard varieties use і, и and ы for three different sounds: /i/, /ɪ/ and /ɨ/, respectively. In Komi, і occurs solely after the consonants д, з, л, н, с, and т and does not palatalize them, while и does. In Kazakh and Khakas, і represents /ɘ/.

Just like the Latin letters I/i and J/j, the dot above the letter appears only in its lowercase form and only if that letter already is not combined with a diacritic above it (notably the diaeresis, used in Ukrainian to note the ї letter of its alphabet). Even when the lowercase form is present without any other diacritic, the dot is not always rendered in historic texts (the same historically applied to the Roman letters i and j). Some modern texts and font styles, except for cursive styles, still discard the "soft" dot on the lowercase letter, because the text is readable without it. However, the current official rules of Belarusian orthography (2008) state that the letter ⟨і⟩ is undotted in printed uppercase, but should be dotted in lowercase and in handwritten uppercase.

== History ==
The Cyrillic soft-dotted letter і was derived from the Greek letter iota (Ι ι). The dot came later with some typefaces through Western European influence, which similarly affected other Cyrillic letters such as а and е. The name of this letter in the Early Cyrillic alphabet was и (i), meaning "and". In the Cyrillic numeral system, soft-dotted І had a value of 10.

In the early Cyrillic alphabet, there was little or no distinction between the Cyrillic letter И, derived from the Greek letter eta, and the soft-dotted letter і. They both remained in the alphabetical repertoire, since they represented different numbers in the Cyrillic numeral system, eight and ten, respectively. They are, therefore, sometimes referred to as octal I and decimal I.

== Usage ==
Languages	Notes
Belarusian, Kazakh, Khakas, Komi, Carpathian Rusyn, Ukrainian	In current use. In Kazakh, ⟨і⟩ is for native [ɘ], but in foreign words it is instead written as ⟨и⟩.
Macedonian	Either this letter or the letter ⟨Й⟩ was used by Macedonian authors to represent the sound /j/ until the introduction of the letter ⟨Ј⟩.
Russian	Equal to the sound of и. In use until 1918, when the revolutionary government implemented a Russian orthography reform and removed the letter from the alphabet completely. Groups opposed to the Soviet government continued to use the letter for decades thereafter.
Romanian	In use until 1860s.
Bulgarian	In use until 1878.
Ossetian	In use until 1923.

=== Rules for usage in Russian (pre-1918) ===
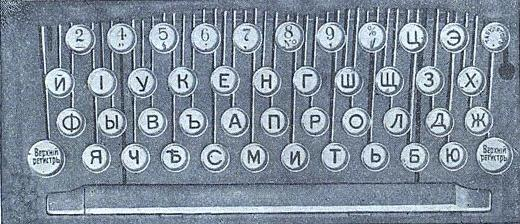
In early Russian typewriters such as the one above, there was no key for the digit 1, so the dotted І was used instead. Following the Russian alphabet reform of 1918, a 1 key was added.

- ⟨і⟩ was used before all vowels and before the semivowel ⟨й⟩ except at the end of a morpheme in a compound word, where ⟨и⟩ was used. So англійскій (English) used ⟨і⟩, but пяти + акровый = пятиакровый (five-acre) used ⟨и⟩.
- ⟨и⟩ was used as the last letter of a word and before consonants except in міръ for "world, universe, local community, commons, society, laity" (and words derived from it) to differentiate from миръ ("peace"). Since 1918, both are spelled мир.
- In a few words derived from Greek, use was derived etymologically based upon whether iota or eta was in the original Greek: Іисусъ "Jesus", from Greek Ιησούς, now written Иисус; also Іванъ from Ἰωάννης, now written Иван. However, since the middle of the 18th century loanwords came to be spelled according to the general rule: Іоаннъ but Иванъ, Никита (instead of Нікита), Филиппъ (instead of Філіппъ).

According to critics of the 1918 reform, the choice of Ии as the only letter to represent that side and the removal of Іі defeated the purpose of "simplifying" the language, as Ии occupies more space and, furthermore, is sometimes indistinguishable from Шш.

The reform also created several homographs, which used to be spelled differently. Examples: есть/ѣсть (to be/eat) and миръ/міръ (peace/the Universe) became есть and мир in both instances.

=== Usage in other languages ===
In Macedonian, this letter, or the letter Й, was used by Macedonian authors to represent the sound /j/ until the introduction of the letter Ј. In Romanian the letter was used until 1860s when it gradually switched to modern Latin-based alphabet. In Bulgarian the letter was used until 1878, while in Ossetian it was used until 1923.

This letter is currently in use in Belarusian, Kazakh, Khakas, Komi, Carpathian Rusyn and Ukrainian, where it usually represents the sound /i/ (in Kazakh and Khakas, /ɘ/). It is the tenth letter in Belarusian, the twelfth in Carpathian Rusyn and Ukrainian, the thirty-eighth in Kazakh and the eleventh in Komi.

=== Dotted I with curve at bottom ===
Dotted I with curve at bottom, also known as Bashkir Dha, is a letter of the Cyrillic script. It was once used in the Bashkir alphabet.

== Computing codes ==
This article is mainly about the Cyrillic Dotted I, this is the computing codes for Cyrillic Dotted I and not the Cyrillic Dotted I with curve at bottom.

Character information
Preview	І		і	
Unicode name	CYRILLIC CAPITAL LETTER; BYELORUSSIAN-UKRAINIAN І		CYRILLIC SMALL LETTER; BYELORUSSIAN-UKRAINIAN І	
Encodings	decimal	hex	dec	hex
Unicode	1030	U+0406	1110	U+0456
UTF-8	208 134	D0 86	209 150	D1 96
Numeric character reference	&#1030;	&#x406;	&#1110;	&#x456;
Named character reference	&Iukcy;		&iukcy;	
KOI8-U	182	B6	166	A6
Code page 855	139	8B	138	8A
Windows-1251	178	B2	179	B3
ISO-8859-5	166	A6	246	F6
Macintosh Cyrillic	167	A7	180	B4

== Related letters and other similar characters ==
- 1 : Digit One
- Ι ι : Greek letter Iota
- I i : Latin letter I
- İ i : Latin letter dotted I
- I ı : Latin letter dotless I
- И и : Cyrillic letter I another letter that is romanized as I
- Ї ї : Cyrillic letter Yi
- Й й : Cyrillic letter Short I
- Ј ј : Cyrillic letter Je
- Ӏ ӏ : Cyrillic letter Palochka
- Ꙇ ꙇ : Cyrillic letter Iota
