= Short I (Cyrillic) =

Letter of the Cyrillic script

- Й й

Usage
- Writing system: Cyrillic
- Type: Alphabetic
- Language of origin: Church Slavonic
- Sound values: [j]
- In Unicode: U+0419, U+0439

History
- Development: И и: Й й
- Transliterations: Y y, J j, ĭ

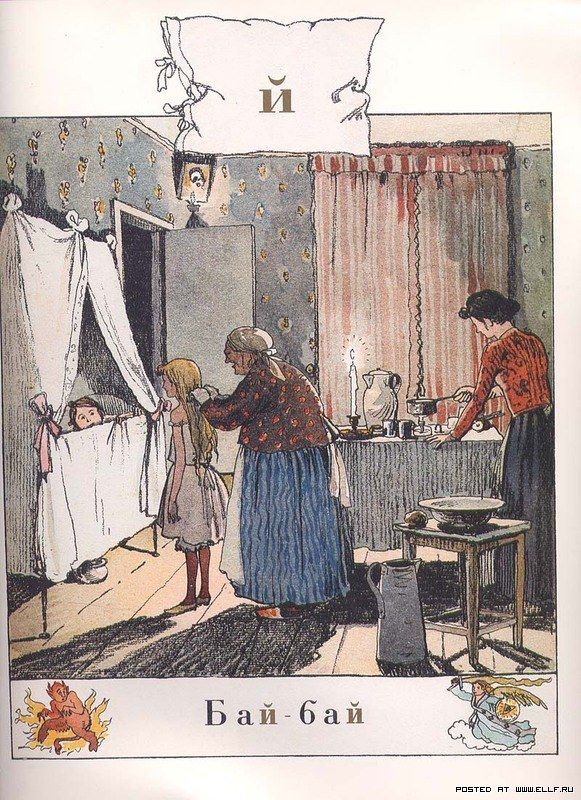
Yot, from Alexandre Benois' 1904 alphabet book

Short I or Yot/Jot (Й й; italics: Й й or Й й; italics: Й й) (sometimes called I Kratkoye, Russian: и краткое, Ukrainian: йот) or I with breve, Russian: и с бреве) is a letter of the Cyrillic script. Graphically, it is formed from the Cyrillic letter И with a breve; however, modern languages generally treat it as an independent letter in its own right.

The short I represents the palatal approximant /j/, like the pronunciation of ⟨y⟩ in yesterday.

Depending on the romanization system in use and the Slavic language that is under examination, it can be romanized as ⟨y⟩, ⟨j⟩, ⟨i⟩ or ⟨ĭ⟩. For more details, see romanization of Russian, romanization of Ukrainian, romanization of Belarusian and romanization of Bulgarian.

== History ==
Active use of ⟨Й⟩ (or, rather, the breve over ⟨И⟩) began around the 15th and 16th centuries. Since the middle of the 17th century, the differentiation between ⟨И⟩ and ⟨Й⟩ is obligatory in the Russian variant of Church Slavonic orthography (used for the Russian language as well). During the alphabet reforms of Peter I, all diacritic marks were removed from the Russian writing system, but shortly after his death, in 1735, the distinction between ⟨И⟩ and ⟨Й⟩ was restored. ⟨Й⟩ was not officially considered a separate letter of the alphabet until the 1930s.

Because ⟨Й⟩ is always soft, it was not required to take a hard sign when it came at the end of a word in pre-reform orthography.

== Usage ==
Language	position in alphabet	name
Belarusian	11th	і нескладовае (i nieskladovaje, or "non-syllabic I")
Bulgarian	10th	и кратко (i kratko or "short I")
Russian	11th	и краткое (i kratkoye or "short I")
Ukrainian	14th	йот /jɔt/, й /ɪj/
Kazakh	13th	қысқа й /qysqa ɪ/ (qysqa i or "short I")

In Russian, it appears predominantly in diphthongs like /ij/ in широкий (shirokiy 'wide'), /aj/ in край (kray 'end', 'krai'), /ej/ in долей (doley '(of) portions'), /oj/ in горой (goroy '(with) mountain'), and /uj/ in буйство (buystvo 'rage'). It is used in other positions only in foreign words, such as Йopк (York, not with ⟨Ё⟩), including fellow Slavic words like Йовович (Yovovich).

In Kazakh, the letter is used to represent a short ɪ sound (e.g. берейік (tr. (Let us) give)). The letter, much like the other 11 Cyrillic letters, does not have another Latin version and merges with Ии (İi).

In Serbo-Croatian and Macedonian, the Cyrillic letter Јe is used to represent the same sound. Latin-based Slavonic writing systems, such as Polish, Czech and the Latin version of Serbo-Croatian use the Latin letter J (not the letter Y, as in English), for that purpose.

== Related letters and other similar characters ==
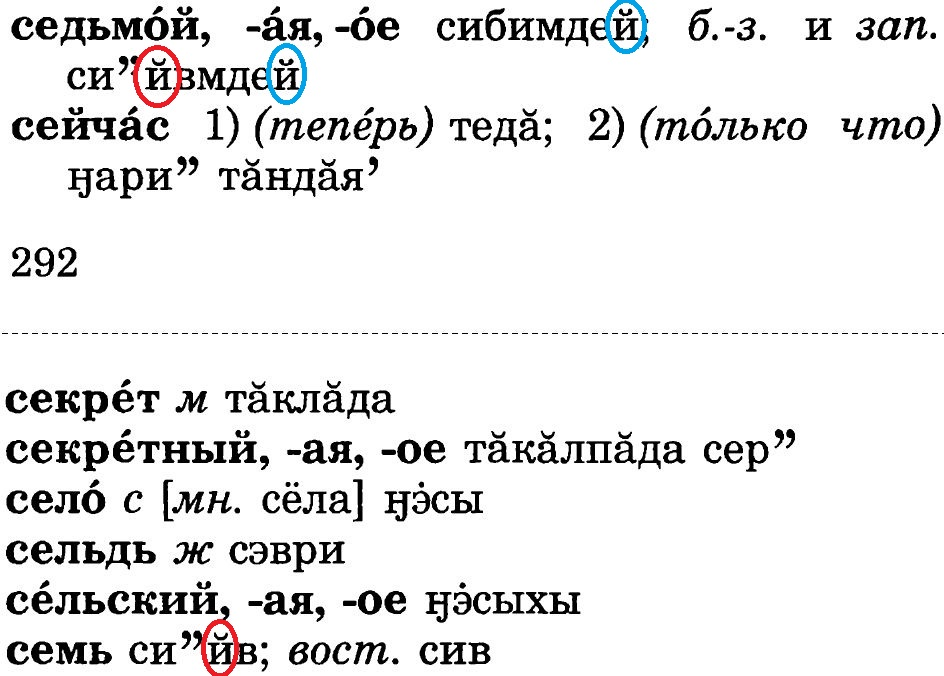
Contrastive use of Cyrillic kratka (for consonant [j]) and Latin breve (for short vowel [ĭ]) above и in Russian-Nenets dictionary

- И и : Cyrillic letter I
- Ы ы : Cyrillic letter Yery
- Η η : Greek letter Eta
- H h : Latin letter H
- І і : Cyrillic letter І
- I i : Latin letter I
- Ĭ ĭ : Latin letter Ĭ
- J j : Latin letter J
- Ј ј : Cyrillic letter Je
- Y y : Latin letter Y
- Ў ў : Cyrillic letter Short U
- ̆ Combining breve U+0306

Note that breve in Й may be quite different from ordinary breve, the former having a thinner central part and thicker ends (the opposite holds for ordinary breve). This is often seen in serif fonts, cf. Й (Cyrillic Short I) and Ŭ (Latin U with breve).

== Computing codes ==
Character information
Preview	Й		й	
Unicode name	CYRILLIC CAPITAL LETTER SHORT I		CYRILLIC SMALL LETTER SHORT I	
Encodings	decimal	hex	dec	hex
Unicode	1049	U+0419	1081	U+0439
UTF-8	208 153	D0 99	208 185	D0 B9
Numeric character reference	&#1049;	&#x419;	&#1081;	&#x439;
Named character reference	&Jcy;		&jcy;	
KOI8-R and KOI8-U	234	EA	202	CA
Code page 855	190	BE	189	BD
Code page 866	137	89	169	A9
Windows-1251	201	C9	233	E9
ISO-8859-5	185	B9	217	D9
Macintosh Cyrillic	137	89	233	E9
