= Em (Cyrillic) =

Letter of the Cyrillic script

Em (мꙑслитє)
- М м

Usage
- Writing system: Cyrillic
- Type: Alphabetic
- Language of origin: Old Church Slavonic
- Sound values: [m], [mʲ]
- In Unicode: U+041C, U+043C

History
Development
N35
        - Μ μ
          - М м
- Transliterations: M m

Other
- Associated numbers: 40 (Cyrillic numerals)

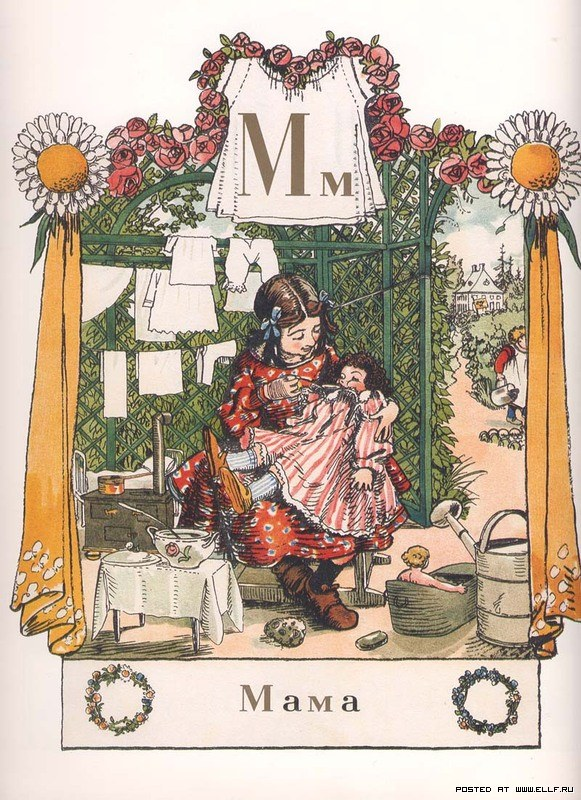
Em, from Alexandre Benois' 1904 alphabet book

Em (М м; italics: М м or М м; italics: М м) is a letter of the Cyrillic script.

Em commonly represents the bilabial nasal consonant /m/, like the pronunciation of ⟨m⟩ in "him".

It is derived from the Greek letter Mu (Μ μ).

== Form ==
The capital Cyrillic letter Em (М м) looks the same as the capital Latin letter M (M m) but, as with most Cyrillic letters, the lowercase form is simply a smaller version of the uppercase letter.

== Usage ==
As used in the alphabets of various languages, Em represents the following sounds:

- bilabial nasal consonant /m/, like the pronunciation of ⟨m⟩ in "him" or meet
- palatalized bilabial nasal consonant /mʲ/

The pronunciations shown in the table are the primary ones for each language; for details consult the articles on the languages.

Language	Position in alphabet	Pronunciation
Belarusian	14th	/m/, /mʲ/
Bulgarian	13th	/m/, /mʲ/
Macedonian	16th	/m/
Russian	14th	/m/, /mʲ/
Serbo-Croatian	15th	/m/
Ukrainian	17th	/m/

== Related letters and other similar characters ==
- Μ μ: Greek letter Mu
- M m: Latin letter M
- Ӎ ӎ: Cyrillic letter Em with tail

== Computing codes ==
Character information
Preview	М		м	
Unicode name	CYRILLIC CAPITAL LETTER EM		CYRILLIC SMALL LETTER EM	
Encodings	decimal	hex	dec	hex
Unicode	1052	U+041C	1084	U+043C
UTF-8	208 156	D0 9C	208 188	D0 BC
Numeric character reference	&#1052;	&#x41C;	&#1084;	&#x43C;
Named character reference	&Mcy;		&mcy;	
KOI8-R and KOI8-U	237	ED	205	CD
Code page 855	211	D3	210	D2
Code page 866	140	8C	172	AC
Windows-1251	204	CC	236	EC
ISO-8859-5	188	BC	220	DC
Macintosh Cyrillic	140	8C	236	EC
