= Shcha =

Cyrillic letter

- Щ щ

Usage
- Writing system: Cyrillic
- Type: Alphabetic
- Language of origin: Old Church Slavonic
- Sound values: [ɕ], [ʂtʂ], [ʃt]
- In Unicode: U+0429, U+0449

History
- Development: Ⱋ ⱋ: Щ щ
- Transliterations: Shch shch, Šč šč, Ŝ ŝ

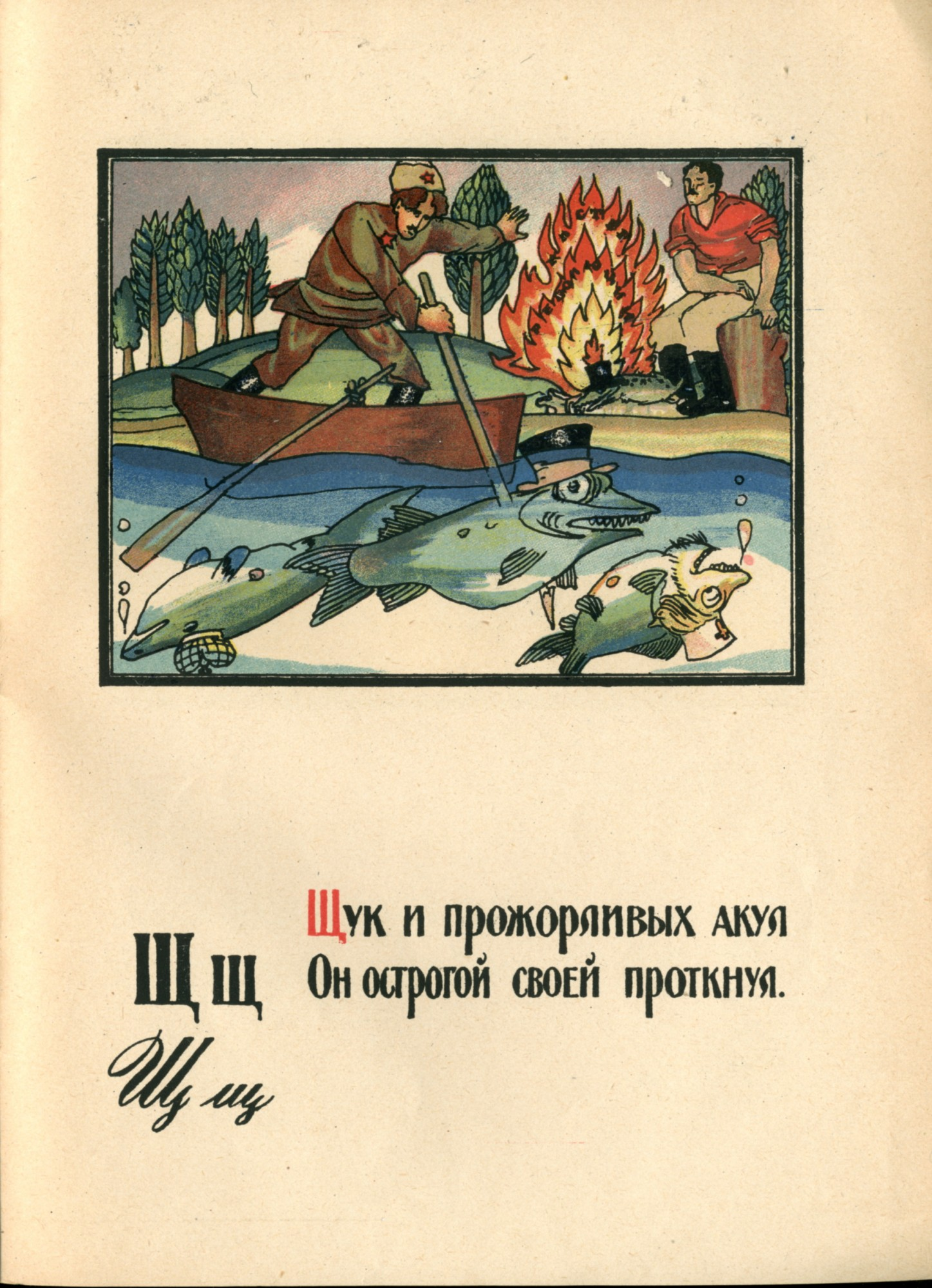
Shcha, from the Alphabet Book оf the Red Army Soldier (1921). The illustration depicts щук (shchuk), "pike" (acc. pl.).

Shcha (Щ щ; italics: Щ щ or Щ щ; italics: Щ щ), Shta, or Scha is a letter of the Cyrillic script.

In Bulgarian, it represents the consonant cluster /ʃt/ and is named Shta.

While in Russian the letter ⟨щ⟩ represents the long voiceless alveolo-palatal fricative /ɕː/, similar to the pronunciation of ⟨sh⟩ in "sheep", in Ukrainian and Rusyn, ⟨щ⟩ represents the consonant cluster /ʃt͡ʃ/ (a hard ⟨sh⟩ followed by ⟨ch⟩, as in "borscht"). This pronunciation preserves the historical character of ⟨щ⟩ as a combination of sounds, consistent with its Old Church Slavonic origins, unlike the modern Russian pronunciation. The official Ukrainian transliteration system renders the letter as ⟨shch⟩, reflecting this two-component structure. This is also reflected in Belarusian, where the letter ⟨щ⟩ was abolished in favour of the phonetic spelling ⟨шч⟩ to represent the similar sound cluster /ʂt͡ʂ/.

Most other non-Slavic languages written in Cyrillic use this letter for loanwords or foreign names; in these contexts, it is often pronounced /ʃ/, an approximation of the Russian pronunciation.

In English, ⟨щ⟩ is romanized as ⟨shch⟩, ⟨ŝ⟩, ⟨šč⟩ or occasionally as ⟨sch⟩. English-speaking learners are often instructed to pronounce it as a cluster, although this no longer reflects the standard modern Russian phonetic realization.

== History ==
Cyrillic Щ (Early Cyrillic form:) is derived from the Glagolitic letter shta Ⱋ, which was a ligature of sha Ⱎ (= Cyrillic Ш, pronounced [ʃ]), and tverdo Ⱅ (= Cyrillic Т, pronounced [t]). The original pronunciation, [ʃt], is maintained in Bulgarian.

This letter was also used in the Komi language as /t͡ʃ/, but it has fallen out of use in favour of digraph ⟨тш⟩.

== Form ==
The form of the letter shcha is considered to have originated as a ligature of the letters Ш and Т. However in later orthographies it began to be depicted as the letter Cyrillic Sha (Ш ш) with a descender. The descender (also used in Ц) has been reinterpreted as a diacritic and used in several letters for non-Slavic languages, such as Ң and Қ.

== Related letters and other similar characters ==
- Ш ш : Cyrillic letter Sha
- С́ с́ : Montenegrin Sje
- Ŝ ŝ : Latin letter Ŝ
- Ś ś : Latin letter Ś

== Computing codes ==
Character information
Preview	Щ		щ	
Unicode name	CYRILLIC CAPITAL LETTER SHCHA		CYRILLIC SMALL LETTER SHCHA	
Encodings	decimal	hex	dec	hex
Unicode	1065	U+0429	1097	U+0449
UTF-8	208 169	D0 A9	209 137	D1 89
Numeric character reference	&#1065;	&#x429;	&#1097;	&#x449;
Named character reference	&SHCHcy;		&shchcy;	
KOI8-R and KOI8-U	253	FD	221	DD
Code page 855	250	FA	249	F9
Code page 866	153	99	233	E9
Windows-1251	217	D9	249	F9
ISO-8859-5	201	C9	233	E9
Macintosh Cyrillic	153	99	249	F9

== See also ==
- Mama ŠČ!
- Transliteration table for romanization of Russian, provides versions ⟨ŝ⟩ (note circumflex vs. caron/háček in ⟨šč⟩), ⟨shh⟩
