= Short U (Cyrillic) =

Letter of the Cyrillic script

- Ў ў

Usage
- Writing system: Cyrillic
- Type: Alphabetic
- Sound values: [w] [o] (Uzbek)
- In Unicode: U+040E

History
- Development: У у: Ў ў

Short U (Ў ў; italics: Ў ў) or U with breve is a letter of the Cyrillic script. The only Slavic language using the letter in its orthography is Belarusian, but it is also used as a phonetic symbol in some Russian and Ukrainian dictionaries. Among the non-Slavic languages using Cyrillic alphabets, ў is used in Dungan, Karakalpak, Karachay-Balkar, Mansi, Sakhalin Nivkh, Ossetian and Siberian Yupik. It is also used in Uzbek – this letter corresponds to Ö in the Uzbek Latin alphabet.

== History ==
=== General historic use ===
The letter originates from the letter izhitsa ⟨Ѵ ѵ⟩ with a breve (Іереѵ̆ская власть, пучина Егеѵ̆ская, etc.) used in certain Ukrainian books at the end of the 16th and the beginning of the 17th centuries. Later, this character was probably in use in the Romanian Cyrillic script, from where it was borrowed in 1836 by the compilers of Ukrainian poetry book Rusalka Dnistrovaja (Русалка днѣстровая). The book's foreword reads “we have accepted Serbian џ … and Wallachian [Romanian] ў …”. In this book, ⟨ў⟩ is used mostly for etymological [l] transformed to [w]. Modern Ukrainian spelling uses ⟨в⟩ (v) in that position.

=== Historic use in Belarusian ===
For Belarusian, the combination of the Cyrillic letter U with a breve ⟨ў⟩ was proposed by P.A. Bessonov in 1870. Before that, various ad hoc adaptations of the Latin U were used, for example, italicized in some publications of Vintsent Dunin-Martsinkyevich, with acute accent ⟨ú⟩ in Jan Czeczot's Da milykh mužyczkoú (To dear peasants, 1846 edition), W with breve ⟨w̆⟩ in Epimakh-Shypila, 1889, or just the letter ⟨u⟩ itself (like in publications of Konstanty Kalinowski, 1862–1863). A U with haček ⟨ǔ⟩ was also used.

After 1870, both the distinction for the phoneme and the new shape of the letter still were not consistently used until the mid-1900s for technical problems, per Bulyka. Among the first publications using it were folklore collections published by Michał Federowski and the first edition of Francišak Bahuševič's Dudka Biełaruskaja (Belarusian flute, published in Kraków, 1891). For quite a while other kinds of renderings (plain ⟨u⟩, or with added accent, haček, or caret) were still being used, sometimes within a single publication (Bahushevich, 1891, Pachobka, 1915), also supposedly because of technical problems.

== Usage ==
=== Belarusian ===
The letter is called non-syllabic u or short u (Belarusian: у нескладовае, romanized: u nyeskladovaye or у кароткае, u karotkaye) in Belarusian because although it resembles the vowel у (u), it does not form syllables. Its equivalent in the Belarusian Latin alphabet is ⟨ŭ⟩, although it is also sometimes transcribed as ⟨w⟩.

In native Belarusian words, ⟨ў⟩ is used after vowels and represents a [w], as in хлеў, pronounced [xlʲew] (chleŭ, ‘shed’) or воўк [vɔwk] (voŭk, ‘wolf’). This is similar to the ⟨w⟩ in English cow /kaʊ/.

The letter ⟨ў⟩ cannot occur before a non-iotated vowel in native words (except compound words such as паўакна, ‘half a window’); when that would be required by grammar, ⟨ў⟩ is replaced by ⟨в⟩ /v/. Compare хлеў ([xlʲew] chleŭ, ‘shed’) with за хлявом ([za xlʲaˈvom] za chlavóm, ‘behind the shed’). Also, when a word starts with an unstressed ⟨у⟩ /u/ and follows a word that ends in a vowel, it forms a diphthong through liaison and it is written with ⟨ў⟩ instead. For example, у хляве ([u xlʲaˈvʲe] u chlavié, ‘in the shed’) but увайшлі яны ў хлеў ([uvajʂˈlʲi jaˈnɨ w xlʲew] uvajšlí janý ŭ chleŭ, ‘they went into the shed’). According to the current official orthographic rules of 2008, proper names conserve the initial ⟨У⟩ in writing, so the capital letter ⟨Ў⟩ can occur only in all-capitals writing. Previous official orthographic rules (1959) also made exception for loanwords (каля універсітэта, ‘near the university’, now spelled каля ўніверсітэта). The unofficial 2005 standardization of Taraškievica allows the capital ⟨Ў⟩ in proper names. In acronyms/initialisms, the word-initial ⟨ў⟩ becomes ⟨У⟩: ВНУ for вышэйшая навучальная ўстанова ‘higher education institution (university, college, institute)’. Also, ⟨Ў⟩ becomes ⟨У⟩ in name initials in Taraškievica.

The letter ⟨ў⟩ is also sometimes used to represent the labial-velar approximant /w/ in foreign loanwords: this usage is allowed by the 2005 standardization of Taraškievica. When it is used thus it can appear before non-iotated vowels, does not require a preceding vowel, and may be capital.

In poetry, word-initial ⟨у⟩ and ⟨ў⟩ are sometimes used according to the rhythm of a poem. In this case, the capital ⟨Ў⟩ may also occur.

=== Uzbek ===
This letter is the 32nd letter of the Uzbek Cyrillic alphabet as it is a letter of its own and not a variant of ⟨у⟩. It corresponds to Oʻ (to be replaced by Ö in April 2027) in the current Uzbek alphabet. It is different from the regular O, which is represented by the Cyrillic letter О. Furthermore, it represents /o/, which is pronounced as either [o] or [ɵ], in contrast to the letter O, which represents /ɒ/.

=== Karakalpak ===
The letter is the 26th letter in the Karakalpak alphabet. It corresponds to the sound /w/ and the Latin letter W.

== In culture ==
In September 2003, during the tenth Days of Belarusian Literacy celebrations, the authorities in Polatsk, the oldest Belarusian city, made a monument to honor the unique Cyrillic Belarusian letter ⟨ў⟩. The original idea for the monument came from professor Paval Siemčanka, a scholar of Cyrillic calligraphy and type.

The letter ⟨ў⟩ is also the namesake of Ў gallery, an art gallery in Minsk between 2009 and 2020.

== Computing codes ==
Character information
Preview	Ў		ў	
Unicode name	CYRILLIC CAPITAL LETTER; SHORT U		CYRILLIC SMALL LETTER; SHORT U	
Encodings	decimal	hex	dec	hex
Unicode	1038	U+040E	1118	U+045E
UTF-8	208 142	D0 8E	209 158	D1 9E
Numeric character reference	&#1038;	&#x40E;	&#1118;	&#x45E;
Named character reference	&Ubrcy;		&ubrcy;	
Code page 855	153	99	152	98
Code page 866	246	F6	247	F7
Windows-1251	161	A1	162	A2
ISO-8859-5	174	AE	254	FE
Macintosh Cyrillic	216	D8	217	D9

== See also ==
- Breve
- Й й : Short I
- Ł ł : Latin letter L with stroke
- Oʻ oʻ : Latin letter Oʻ, used in Uzbek
- Ŭ ŭ : Latin letter Ŭ, used in Esperanto
- W w : Latin letter W
- Ԝ ԝ : Cyrillic letter Ԝe
- В̌ в̌ : Cyrillic letter Ve with caron
