= Y =

Twenty-fifth letter of the Latin alphabet

- Y y

Usage
- Writing system: Latin script
- Type: Alphabetic and logographic
- Language of origin: Latin language
- Sound values: [i]; [iː]; [y]; [ɪ]; [ʏ]; [ɨ]; [ɯ]; [ɘ]; [ə]; [ɛː]; [aː]; [ɛi]; [æi]; [aɪ]; [ɑɪ]; [ɒɪ]; [ʌɪ]; [əɪ]; [j]; [ɥ]; [ʝ]; [ɟ͡ʝ]; [d͡z]; [ʔ]
- In Unicode: U+0059, U+0079
- Alphabetical position: 25

History
Development
T3
        - Υ υ
          - Y y
- Time period: 54 CE to present
- Descendants: Ỿ; ¥; Ꮙ; Ꮍ; Ꭹ
- Sisters: U; V; W; F; Ѵ; У; Ў; Ұ; Ү; ו | و | ܘ; וּ; וֹ; ࠅ; 𐎆; 𐡅; ወ; ય; य; য়

Other
- Associated graphs: y(x), ly, ny
- Writing direction: Left-to-right

Y (minuscule: y) is the twenty-fifth and penultimate letter of the Latin alphabet, used in the modern English alphabet, the alphabets of other western European languages, and others worldwide. According to some authorities, it is the sixth (or seventh if including W) vowel letter of the English alphabet. Its name in English is wye (pronounced /ˈwaɪ/), plural wyes.

In the English writing system, it mostly represents a vowel and seldom a consonant, and in other orthographies it may represent a vowel or a consonant.

== Name ==
In Latin, Y was named I graeca ("Greek I"), since the classical Greek sound /y/, similar to modern German ü or French u, was not a native sound for Latin speakers, and the letter was initially only used to spell foreign words. This history has led to the standard modern names of the letter in Romance languages – i grego in Galician, i grega in Catalan, i grec in French and Romanian, and i greca in Italian – all meaning "Greek I". The names igrek in Polish and i gờ-rét in Vietnamese are both phonetic borrowings of the French name. In Dutch, the letter is either only found in loanwords, or is practically equivalent to the digraph IJ. Hence, both Griekse ij and i-grec are used, as well as ypsilon. In Spanish, Y is also called i griega; however, in the twentieth century, the shorter name ye was proposed and was officially recognized as its name in 2010 by the Real Academia Española, although its original name is still accepted.

The original Greek name, υ ψιλόν (upsilon), has also been adapted into several modern languages. For example, it is called Ypsilon in German, ypsilon in Dutch, and ufsilon i in Icelandic. Both names are used in Italian, ipsilon or i greca; likewise in Portuguese, ípsilon or i grego. In Czech, it is called both ypsilon, as well as tvrdé Y ("hard Y") to distinguish it from měkké I ("soft I"), even though modern Czech makes no phonetic difference between the two vowels by themselves. In Faroese, the letter is simply called seinna i ("later i") because of its later place in the alphabet. France has a commune called Y, pronounced /i/, whose inhabitants go by the demonym upsilonienne/upsilonien in feminine and masculine form respectively.

== History ==
Proto-Sinaitic	Phoenician waw	Western Greek Upsilon	Latin Y
			Latin Y

The oldest direct ancestor of the letter Y was the Semitic letter waw (pronounced as [w]), from which also come F, U, V, and W. See F for details. The Greek and Latin alphabets developed from the Phoenician form of this early alphabet.

The form of the modern letter Y is derived from the Greek letter upsilon. It dates back to the Latin of the first century BC, when upsilon was introduced a second time, this time with its "foot" to distinguish it. It was used to transcribe loanwords from the Attic dialect of Greek, which had the non-Latin vowel sound /y/ (as found in modern French cru (raw) or German grün (green)) in words that had been pronounced with /u/ in earlier Greek.

Because [y] was not a native sound of Latin, Latin speakers had trouble pronouncing it, and it was usually pronounced /i/. Some Latin words of Italic origin also came to be spelled with 'y': Latin silva ('forest') was commonly spelled sylva, in analogy with the Greek cognate and synonym ὕλη.

=== English ===
Summary of the sources of Modern English "Y"
Phoenician	Greek	Latin	English (approximate times of changes)		
Phoenician	Greek	Latin	Old	Middle	Modern
		V →	U →	V/U/VV/UU →	V/U/W
		Y →	Y (vowel /y/) →	Y (vowel /i/) →	Y (vowels)
		C →			
		G →	Ᵹ (consonantal /ɡ/, /j/ or /ɣ/) →	Ȝ (consonantal /ɡ/, /j/ or /ɣ/) →	G/GH
		G →	Ᵹ (consonantal /ɡ/, /j/ or /ɣ/) →	Ȝ (consonantal /ɡ/, /j/ or /ɣ/) →	Y (consonant)

==== Vowel ====
The letter Y was used to represent the sound /y/ in Old English, so Latin ⟨u⟩, ⟨y⟩ and ⟨i⟩ were all used to represent distinct vowel sounds. But, by the time of Middle English, /y/ had lost its roundedness and became identical to ⟨i⟩ (/iː/ and /ɪ/). Therefore, many words that originally had ⟨i⟩ were spelled with ⟨y⟩, and vice versa.

In Modern English, ⟨y⟩ can represent the same vowel sounds as the letter ⟨i⟩. The use of ⟨y⟩ to represent a vowel is more restricted in Modern English than it was in Middle and early Modern English. It occurs mainly in the following three environments: for upsilon in Greek loan-words (system: Greek σύστημα), at the end of a word (rye, city; compare cities, where S is final), and in place of I before the ending -ing (dy-ing, ty-ing).

==== Consonant ====
As a consonant in English, ⟨y⟩ normally represents a palatal approximant, /j/ (year, yore). In this usage, the letter Y has replaced the Middle English letter yogh (Ȝȝ), which developed from the letter G, ultimately from Semitic gimel. Yogh could also represent other sounds, such as /ɣ/, which came to be written gh in Middle English.

==== Confusion in writing with the letter thorn ====
When printing was introduced to Great Britain, Caxton and other English printers used Y in place of Þ (thorn: Modern English th), which did not exist in continental typefaces. From this convention comes the spelling of the as ye in the mock archaism Ye Olde Shoppe. But, in spite of the spelling, pronunciation was the same as for modern the (stressed /ðiː/, unstressed /ðə/). Pronouncing the article ye as yee (/jiː/) is purely a modern spelling pronunciation.

=== Other languages ===
In some of the Nordic languages, ⟨y⟩ is used to represent the sound /y/. The distinction between /y/ and /i/ has been lost in Icelandic and Faroese, making the distinction purely orthographic and historical. A similar merger of /y/ into /i/ happened in Greek around the beginning of the 2nd millennium, making the distinction between iota (Ι, ι) and upsilon (Υ, υ) purely a matter of historical spelling there as well. The distinction is retained in Danish, Norwegian, and Swedish.

In the West Slavic languages, ⟨y⟩ was adopted as a sign for the close central unrounded vowel /ɨ/; later, /ɨ/ merged with /i/ in Czech and Slovak, whereas Polish retains it with the pronunciation [ɘ]. Similarly, in Middle Welsh, ⟨y⟩ came to be used to designate the vowels /ɨ/ and /ɘ/ in a way predictable from the position of the vowel in the word. Since then, /ɨ/ has merged with /i/ in Southern Welsh dialects, but /ɘ/ is retained.

== Use in writing systems ==
Pronunciation of ⟨y⟩ by language
Orthography	Phonemes
Afrikaans	/əi/
Albanian	/y/
Alemannic	/iː/
Azerbaijani	/j/
Chamorro	/d͡z/
Standard Chinese (pinyin)	/j/
Cornish	/i/, /ɪ/, /j/
Czech	/i/
Danish	/y/, /ʏ/
Dutch	/ɛi/, /i/, /ɪ/, /j/
English	/ɪ/, /aɪ/, /i/, /ə/, /ɜː/, /aɪə/, /j/
Faroese	/i/
Finnish	/y/
German	/y/, /ʏ/, /j/
Guarani	/ɨ/
Icelandic	/ɪ/
Indonesian	/j/
Khasi	/ɨ/, /ʔ/
Lithuanian	/iː/
Malagasy	/i/
Manx	/ə/
Norwegian	/y/, /ʏ/
Polish	/ɨ/
Slovak	/i/
Spanish	/ʝ/
Swedish	/y/, /ʏ/, /j/
Turkish	/j/
Turkmen	/ɯ/
Uzbek	/j/
Vietnamese	/i/
Welsh	/ɨ̞/ or /ɪ/, /ɨː/ or /iː/, /ə/, /ə/ or /əː/

=== English ===
As /j/:

- at the beginning of a word, as in yes
- at the beginning of a syllable before a vowel, as in beyond, lawyer, canyon

As /aɪ/:

- under stress in an open syllable, as in my, type, rye, lying, pyre, tyre, typhoon
- in a stressed open syllable, as in hyphen, cycle, cylon
- in a pretonic open syllable, as in hypothesis, psychologist
- word-finally after a consonant in some words, such as ally, unify

As /i/:

- without stress at the end of multi-syllable word, as in happy, baby, lucky, accuracy
- used as a part of the digraph ⟨ey⟩ at the end of some words, as in money, key, valley

As non-syllabic [ɪ̯] (part of the diphthongs /eɪ/, /ɔɪ/):

- after vowels at the end of words, as in play, grey, boy

As /ɪ/:

- in a closed syllable without stress and with stress as in myth, system, gymnastics
- in a closed syllable under stress as in typical, lyric
- in an open syllable without stress as in physique, oxygen

Other:

- combining with ⟨r⟩ as /ɜːr/ under stress (like ⟨i⟩ in bird), as in myrtle, myrrh
- as /ə/ (schwa) in words like martyr

In English morphology, -y is an adjectival suffix.

Y is the ninth least frequently used letter in the English language (after P, B, V, K, J, X, Q, and Z), with a frequency of about 2% in words.

=== Other languages ===
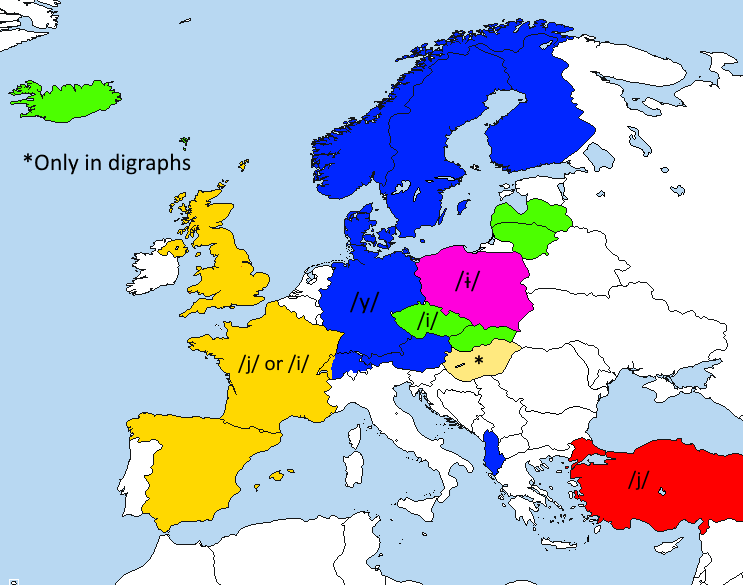
Pronunciation of written ⟨y⟩ in European languages (Actual pronunciation may vary)

In Dutch and German, ⟨y⟩ appears only in loanwords and proper names:

- In Dutch, it usually represents /i/. It may sometimes be left out of the Dutch alphabet and replaced with the ⟨ij⟩ digraph, representing the diphthong [ɛi]. In addition, ⟨y⟩ and ⟨ÿ⟩ are occasionally used instead of Dutch ⟨IJ⟩ and ⟨ij⟩, although this spelling is archaic.
- In German orthography, the pronunciation /yː/ has taken hold since the 19th century in classical loanwords – for instance in words like typisch /ˈtyːpɪʃ/ 'typical', Hyäne, Hysterie, mysteriös, Syndrom, System, and Typ. It is also used for the sound /j/ in loanwords, such as Yacht (variation spelling: Jacht), Yak, and Yeti. However, yo-yo is spelled "Jo-Jo" in German, and yoghurt/yogurt/yoghourt is "Joghurt". The letter ⟨y⟩ is also used in many geographical names, e.g. Bayern Bavaria, Ägypten Egypt, Libyen Libya, Paraguay, Syrien Syria, Uruguay, and Zypern Cyprus (but Jemen for Yemen and Jugoslawien for Yugoslavia). Especially in German names, the pronunciations /iː/ or /ɪ/ occur as well; for instance, in the name Meyer, where it serves as a variant of ⟨i⟩, cf. Meier, another common spelling of the name. In German, the y is preserved in the plural form of some loanwords such as Babys, 'babies' and Partys, 'parties'.

A ⟨y⟩ that derives from the ⟨ij⟩ ligature occurs in the Afrikaans language, a descendant of Dutch, and in Alemannic German names. In Afrikaans, it denotes the diphthong [əi]. In Alemannic German names, it denotes long /iː/, for instance in Schnyder [ˈʃniːdər] or Schwyz [ʃviːts] – the cognate non-Alemannic German names Schneider [ˈʃnaɪdər] or Schweiz [ʃvaɪts] have the diphthong /aɪ/ that developed from long /iː/.

The letter ⟨y⟩ represents the sounds /y/ or /ʏ/ (sometimes long) in Old Norse and their descendants such as Danish, Norwegian, and Swedish with the exception of Icelandic. In Danish and Swedish, its use as a semivowel (/j/) is limited to loanwords, whereas in Norwegian, it appears as a semivowel in native words such as høyre /²hœʏ̯.rə/.

In Icelandic writing system, due to the loss of the Old Norse rounding of the vowel /y/, the letters ⟨y⟩ and ⟨ý⟩ are now pronounced identically to the letters ⟨i⟩ and ⟨í⟩, namely as /ɪ/ and /i/ respectively. The difference in spelling is thus purely etymological. In Faroese, too, the contrast has been lost, and ⟨y⟩ is always pronounced /i/, whereas the accented versions ⟨ý⟩ and ⟨í⟩ designate the same diphthong /ʊi/ (shortened to /u/ in some environments). In both languages, it can also form part of diphthongs such as ⟨ey⟩ (in both languages), pronounced /ei/, and ⟨oy⟩, pronounced /ɔi/ (Faroese only).

In French orthography, ⟨y⟩ is pronounced as [i] when a vowel (as in the words cycle, y) and as [j] as a consonant (as in yeux, voyez). It alternates orthographically with ⟨i⟩ in the conjugations of some verbs, indicating a [j] sound. In most cases when ⟨y⟩ follows a vowel, it modifies the pronunciation of the vowel: ⟨ay⟩ [ɛ], ⟨oy⟩ [wa], ⟨uy⟩ [ɥi]. The letter ⟨y⟩ has double function (modifying the vowel as well as being pronounced as [j] or [i]) in the words payer, balayer, moyen, essuyer, pays, etc., but in some words it has only a single function: [j] in bayer, mayonnaise, coyote; modifying the vowel at the end of proper names like Chardonnay and Fourcroy. In French, ⟨y⟩ can have a diaeresis (tréma) as in Moÿ-de-l'Aisne.

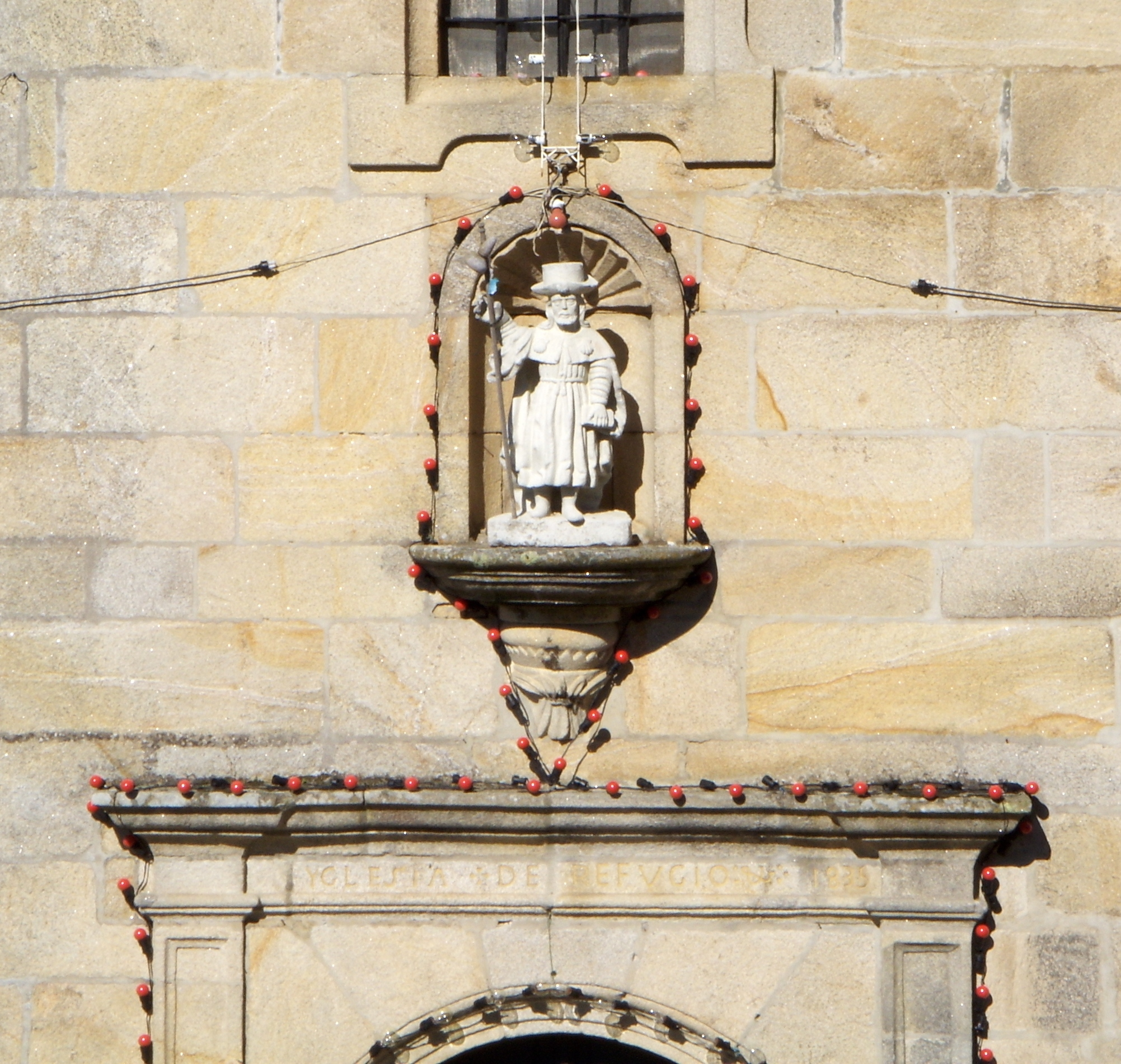
This church at Nigrán, Spain, is labeled as YGLESIA DE REFVGIO. It would be iglesia de refugio ("sanctuary church") in modern orthography.

In Spanish, ⟨y⟩ was used as a word-initial form of ⟨i⟩ that was more visible. (German has used ⟨j⟩ in a similar way.) Hence, el yugo y las flechas was a symbol sharing the initials of Isabella I of Castille (Ysabel) and Ferdinand II of Aragon. This spelling was reformed by the Royal Spanish Academy and currently is only found in proper names spelled archaically, such as Ybarra or CYII, the symbol of the Canal de Isabel II. Appearing alone as a word, the letter ⟨y⟩ is a grammatical conjunction with the meaning "and" in Spanish and is pronounced /i/. As a consonant, ⟨y⟩ represents [ʝ] in Spanish. The letter is called i/y griega, literally meaning "Greek I", after the Greek letter ypsilon, or ye.

In Portuguese, ⟨y⟩ (called ípsilon in Brazil, and either ípsilon or i grego in Portugal) was, together with ⟨k⟩ and ⟨w⟩, recently reintroduced as the 25th letter, and 19th consonant, of the Portuguese alphabet, in consequence of the Portuguese Language Orthographic Agreement of 1990. It is mostly used in loanwords from English, Japanese and Spanish. Loanwords in general, primarily gallicisms in both varieties, are more common in Brazilian Portuguese than in European Portuguese. It was always common for Brazilians to stylize Tupi-influenced names of their children with the letter (which is present in most Romanizations of Old Tupi) e.g. Guaracy, Jandyra, Mayara – though placenames and loanwords derived from indigenous origins had the letter substituted for ⟨i⟩ over time e.g. Nictheroy became Niterói. Usual pronunciations are /i/, [j], [ɪ] and /ɨ/ (the two latter ones are inexistent in European and Brazilian Portuguese varieties respectively, being both substituted by /i/ in other dialects). The letters ⟨i⟩ and ⟨y⟩ are regarded as phonemically not dissimilar, though the first corresponds to a vowel and the latter to a consonant, and both can correspond to a semivowel depending on its place in a word.

Italian, too, has ⟨y⟩ (ipsilon) in a small number of loanwords. The letter is also common in some surnames native to the German-speaking province of Bolzano, such as Mayer or Mayr.

In Guaraní, it represents the vowel [ɨ].

In Polish, it represents the vowel [ɘ] (or, according to some descriptions, [ɨ̞]), which contrasts with [i], e.g. my (we) and mi (me). No native Polish word begins with ⟨y⟩; very few foreign words keep ⟨y⟩ at the beginning, e.g. yeti (pronounced [ˈjɛtʲi]).

In Czech and Slovak, the distinction between the vowels expressed by ⟨y⟩ and ⟨i⟩, as well as by ⟨ý⟩ and ⟨í⟩ has been lost (similarly to Icelandic and Faroese), but the consonants d, t, n (also l in Slovak) before orthographic (and historical) ⟨y⟩ are not palatalized, whereas they are before ⟨i⟩. Therefore, ⟨y⟩ is called tvrdé y (hard y), while ⟨i⟩ is měkké i (soft i). ⟨ý⟩ can never begin any word, while ⟨y⟩ can never begin a native word.

In Welsh, it is usually pronounced [ə] in non-final syllables and [ɨ] or [i] (depending on the accent) in final syllables.

In the Standard Written Form of the Cornish Language, it represents the [ɪ] and [ɪː] of Revived Middle Cornish and the [ɪ] and [iː] of Revived Late Cornish. It can also represent Tudor and Revived Late Cornish [ɛ] and [eː] and consequently be replaced in writing with ⟨e⟩. It is also used in forming a number of diphthongs. As a consonant it represents [j].

In Finnish, Karelian and Albanian, ⟨y⟩ is always pronounced [y]. In Finnish and Karelian, the letter may be doubled to represent a long vowel: ⟨yy⟩ [yː].

In Estonian, ⟨y⟩ is used in foreign proper names and is pronounced as in the source language. It is also unofficially used as a substitute for ⟨ü⟩ and is pronounced the same as in Finnish.

In Hungarian orthography, y is only used in the digraphs "gy", "ly", "ny", "ty", in some surnames (e.g. Bátory), and in foreign words.

In Lithuanian, ⟨y⟩ is the 15th letter (following ⟨į⟩ and preceding ⟨j⟩ in the alphabet) and is a vowel. It is called the long i and is pronounced /iː/, like in English see.

When used as a vowel in Vietnamese, the letter ⟨y⟩ represents the sound /i/; when it is a monophthong, it is functionally equivalent to the Vietnamese letter ⟨i⟩. There have been efforts to replace all such uses with ⟨y⟩ altogether, but they have been largely unsuccessful. As a consonant, it represents the palatal approximant. The capital letter ⟨Y⟩ is also used in Vietnamese as a given name.

In Aymara, Indonesian/Malaysian, Turkish, Quechua and the romanization of Japanese, ⟨y⟩ is always a palatal consonant, denoting [j], as in English.

In Malagasy, the letter ⟨y⟩ represents the final variation of /ɨ/.

In Turkmen, ⟨y⟩ represents [ɯ].

In Washo, lower-case ⟨y⟩ represents a typical wye sound, while upper-case ⟨Y⟩ represents a voiceless wye sound, a bit like the consonant in English hue.

=== Other systems ===
In the International Phonetic Alphabet, ⟨y⟩ corresponds to the close front rounded vowel, and the related character ⟨ʏ⟩ corresponds to the near-close near-front rounded vowel.

== Other uses ==
- In mathematics, y is commonly used as the name for a dependent variable. The modern tradition of using x, y and z to represent an unknown (incognita) was introduced by René Descartes in La Géométrie (1637).
- The SI prefix for 10^{24} is yotta, abbreviated by the letter Y.

== Related characters ==
Cyrillic У, Latin Y and Greek Υ and ϒ in FreeSerif – one of the few typefaces that distinguish between the Latin and the Greek form

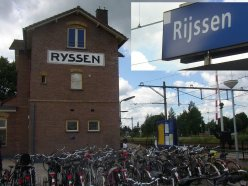
The Dutch digraph IJ is sometimes written like a Cyrillic У.

=== Descendants and related characters in the Latin alphabet ===
- Y with diacritics: Ý ý Ỳ ỳ Ŷ ŷ Ÿ ÿ Ỹ ỹ Ẏ ẏ Ỵ ỵ ẙ Ỷ ỷ Ȳ ȳ Ɏ ɏ Ƴ ƴ
- ʎ and ʏ are used in the International Phonetic Alphabet (IPA)
- IPA superscript letters: 𐞠 𐞲 𐞡
- 𝼆 : Small letter turned y with belt is an extension to IPA for disordered speech (extIPA)
- U+AB5A ꭚ LATIN SMALL LETTER Y WITH SHORT RIGHT LEG is used in the Teuthonista phonetic transcription system
- ʸ is used for phonetic transcription
- Ỿ ỿ : Y with loop is used by some Welsh medievalists to indicate the schwa sound of ⟨y⟩

=== Ancestors and siblings in other alphabets ===
- 𐤅: Semitic letter Waw, from which the following symbols originally derive:
  - Υ υ : Greek letter Upsilon, from which Y derives
    - Ⲩ ⲩ : Coptic letter epsilon/he (not to be confused with the unrelated Greek letter Ε ε called epsilon)
    - 𐌖 : Old Italic U/V, which is the ancestor of modern Latin V and U
    - 𐍅 : Gothic letter uuinne/vinja, which is transliterated as w
    - У у : Cyrillic letter U, which derives from Greek upsilon via the digraph omicron-upsilon used to represent the sound /u/
    - Ѵ ѵ : Cyrillic letter izhitsa, which derives from Greek upsilon and represents the sounds /i/ or /v/. This letter is archaic in the modern writing systems of the living Slavic languages, but it is still used in the writing system of the Slavic liturgical language Church Slavonic.
    - Ү ү : Cyrillic letter Ue (or straight U)
    - Ұ ұ : Kazakh Short U

=== Derived signs, symbols and abbreviations ===
- ¥ : Yen sign
- ⓨ : In Japan, ⓨ is a symbol used for resale price maintenance.

== Other representations ==
=== Computing ===
- U+0059 Y LATIN CAPITAL LETTER Y
- U+0079 y LATIN SMALL LETTER Y
- U+FF39 Ｙ FULLWIDTH LATIN CAPITAL LETTER Y
- U+FF59 ｙ FULLWIDTH LATIN SMALL LETTER Y

=== Other ===
NATO phonetic	Morse code
Yankee	▄▄▄ ▄ ▄▄▄ ▄▄▄

Signal flag

Flag semaphore
American manual alphabet (ASL fingerspelling)
British manual alphabet (BSL fingerspelling)
Braille dots-13456
Unified English Braille
