= Romanization of Macedonian =

Transliteration of text from the Macedonian Cyrillic alphabet into the Latin alphabet

The romanization of Macedonian is the transliteration of text in Macedonian from the Macedonian Cyrillic alphabet into the Latin alphabet. Romanization can be used for various purposes, such as rendering of proper names in foreign contexts, or for informal writing of Macedonian in environments where Cyrillic is not easily available. Official use of romanization by North Macedonia's authorities is found, for instance, on road signage and in passports. Several different codified standards of transliteration currently exist and there is widespread variability in practice.

Although used for transliteration, Macedonian Latin script is neither widespread nor used in any formal or semi-formal communication in Macedonia. The language law of Macedonia emphasizes Cyrillic as the only alphabet of Macedonian language.

== Romanization systems ==
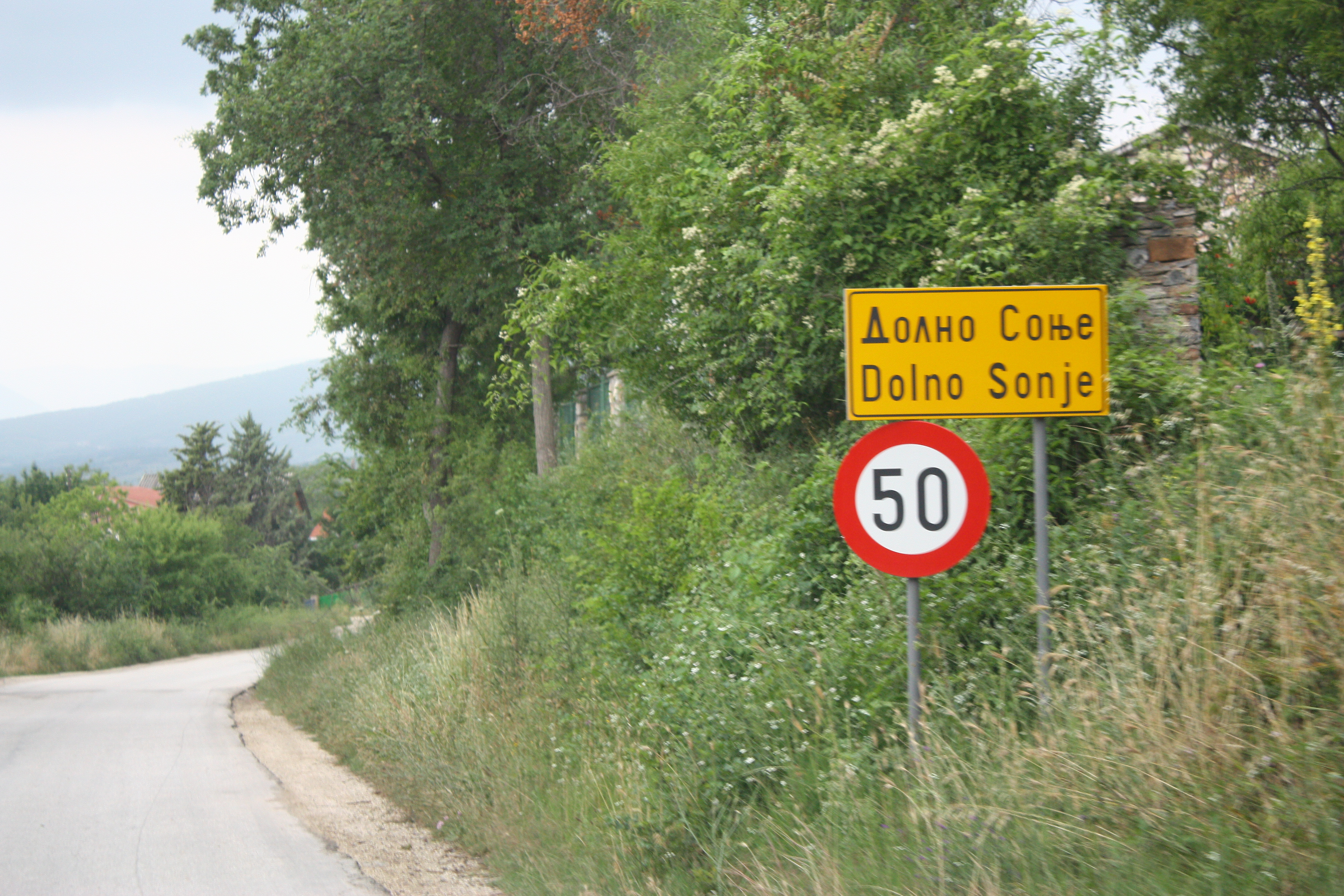
Road sign to Dolno Sonje in Macedonian Cyrillic (above) with romanization (below)

For a number of Cyrillic letters, transliteration into matching Latin letters is straightforward. Cyrillic а, б, в, г, д, е, з, и, к, л, м, н, о, п, р, с, т, у, ф are matched with Latin a, b, v, g, d, e, z, i, k, l, m, n, o, p, r, s, t, u, f, according to all conventions. Cyrillic ц (pronounced [ts]) is mostly rendered as c, in accordance with the conventions for many other Slavic (and non-Slavic) languages. The letter х is typically rendered as h, matching the pronunciation in Macedonian. For the Macedonian/Serbian letter ј, the preferred transliteration is its visual Latin counterpart j (rather than y, otherwise widely used in English for the rendering of the same glide sound in other languages). For other Cyrillic letters, the choice is between a single Latin letter with a diacritic, and a digraph of two Latin letters. This goes mainly for the letters denoting palatalised consonants, and for those denoting fricatives and affricates in the alveolar and palatal range.

=== Digraph system ===
This system uses digraphs instead of diacritics, making it easier for use in environments where diacritics may pose a technical problem, such as typing on computers. Common usage has gj, kj for ѓ, ќ, either dj or dzh for џ, and sometimes ts for ц. Such a diacritic-free system, with digraphs ch, sh, zh, dz, dj, gj, kj, lj, nj has been adopted since 2008 for use in official documents such as passports, ID cards and driver's licenses. The system adopted for digraph transliteration is ICAO Doc 9303. The Macedonian Journal of Medical Sciences and the State Statistical Office of North Macedonia use similar digraph system.

=== ISO 9 system ===
A standardized system of transliteration based on Gaj's Latin alphabet has been used since 1950s and defined in ISO 9:1968; this system was also adopted by the Macedonian Academy of Arts and Sciences in 1970, BGN/PCGN (in 2013), and ALA-LC and is taught in schools in North Macedonia. It uses letters with diacritics ž, č, š for Cyrillic ж, ч, ш respectively (as for many other Slavic languages), and ǵ, ḱ for the special Macedonian letters ѓ, ќ. The palatalised consonants of Cyrillic љ, њ are rendered with digraphs lj, nj (although the academic orthography also permits using ĺ, ń), and the voiced affricates of Cyrillic ѕ, џ with dz, dž respectively. The most recent edition of the Macedonian orthography mentions this system as well as the digraphic system, saying that the latter is used for personal names in official documents.

The palatal plosives ѓ, ќ are also sometimes rendered as Latin đ, ć, following a Serbian convention (đ, ć are the Gaj's Latin equivalents of Serbian Cyrillic ђ and ћ, which etymologically correspond to Macedonian ѓ, ќ in many words.) This convention is found in the system adopted by the US Board on Geographic Names (BGN) and the British PCGN in 1981, (before 2013) as well as by the United Nations Conference on the Standardization of Geographic Names (UNCSGN). According to this system, ѓ, ќ are transliterated as plain g and k before front vowels (е, и), but as đ and ć respectively in other environments. Otherwise, this system is identical to that of ISO 9 (R:1968).

The Macedonian Academy of Arts and Sciences uses gj and kj for the palatal plosives on its official website.

The ISO 9:1995 is a standard that completely avoids digraphs and permits to romanize any Cyrillic text without knowing in what language it is. However, it is rarely used because of having unusual diacriticized letters.

Comparative table of some standard romanizations of the Macedonian letters
Cyrillic	IPA	ISO 9 (1995)	National Academy (1970), BGN/PCGN (2013), ALA-LC	BGN/PCGN (pre-2013)/ UN	ISO 9 (1968)	MJMS/SSO	Official Documents/ Cadastre	Gaj's Alphabet
А а	/a/	A a						
Б б	/b/	B b						
В в	/v/	V v						
Г г	/ɡ/	G g						
Д д	/d/	D d						
Ѓ ѓ	/ɟ/	Ǵ ǵ		G g / Đ đ	G g	Gj gj		Đ đ
Е е	/ɛ/	E e						
Ж ж	/ʒ/	Ž ž		Ž ž	Zh zh			Ž ž
З з	/z/	Z z						
Ѕ ѕ	/dz/	Ẑ ẑ	Dz dz					
И и	/i/	I i						
Ј ј	/j/	J̌ ǰ	J j					
К к	/k/	K k						
Л л	/l/	L l						
Љ љ	/ʎ/	L̂ l̂	Lj lj					
М м	/m/	M m						
Н н	/n/	N n						
Њ њ	/ɲ/	N̂ n̂	Nj nj					
О о	/ɔ/	O o						
П п	/p/	P p						
Р р	/r/	R r						
С с	/s/	S s						
Т т	/t/	T t						
Ќ ќ	/c/	Ḱ ḱ		K k / Ć ć	K k	Kj kj		Ć ć
У у	/u/	U u						
Ф ф	/f/	F f						
Х х	/x/	H h			Kh kh	H h		
Ц ц	/ts/	C c			Ts ts	Ts ts / C c	C c	
Ч ч	/tʃ/	Č č			Ch ch			Č č
Џ џ	/dʒ/	D̂ d̂	Dž dž		Dzh dzh		Dj dj	Dž dž
Ш ш	/ʃ/	Š š			Sh sh			Š š

== See also ==
- Cyrillic alphabets
- Cyrillic script
- Macedonian alphabet
