= YUSCII =

7-bit character encodings for Yugoslav languages

YUSCII encoding family
- MIME / IANA: Latin: JUS_I.B1.002; Serbian Cyrillic: JUS_I.B1.003-serb; Macedonian: JUS_I.B1.003-mac
- Alias(es): Latin: ISO 646-YU, CROSCII, SLOSCII; Serbian: SRPSCII; Macedonian: MAKSCII
- Languages: Serbo-Croatian, Slovenian, Macedonian
- Standard: Latin: JUS I.B1.002; Serbian Cyrillic: JUS I.B1.003; Macedonian: JUS I.B1.004
- Classification: 7-bit encoding Latin: ISO 646
- Succeeded by: Latin: ISO 8859-2, Windows-1250; Cyrillic: ISO 8859-5, Windows-1251
- Other related encoding: KOI-7

YUSCII is an informal name for several JUS standards for 7-bit character encoding. These include:

- JUS I.B1.002 (ISO-IR-141, ISO 646-YU), which encodes Gaj's Latin alphabet, used for Serbo-Croatian and Slovenian language
- JUS I.B1.003 (ISO-IR-146), which encodes Serbian Cyrillic alphabet, and
- JUS I.B1.004 (ISO-IR-147), which encodes Macedonian Cyrillic alphabet.

The encodings are based on ISO 646, a 7-bit Latin alphabet character encoding standard, and were used in Yugoslavia before widespread use of the later CP 852, ISO-8859-2/8859-5, Windows-1250/1251 and Unicode standards. It was named after ASCII, having the first word "American" replaced with "Yugoslav": "Yugoslav Standard Code for Information Interchange". Specific standards are also sometimes called by a local name: SLOSCII, CROSCII or SRPSCII for JUS I.B1.002, SRPSCII for JUS I.B1.003, MAKSCII for JUS I.B1.004.

JUS I.B1.002 is a national ISO 646 variant, i.e. equal to basic ASCII with less frequently used symbols replaced with specific letters of Gaj's alphabet. Cyrillic standards further replace Latin alphabet letters with corresponding Cyrillic letters. Љ (lj), Њ (nj), Џ (dž) and ѕ (dz) correspond to Latin digraphs, and are mapped over Latin letters which are not used in Serbian or Macedonian (q, w, x, y).

YUSCII was originally developed for teleprinters but it also spread for computer use. This was widely considered a bad idea among software developers who needed the original ASCII such as {, [, }, ], ^, ~, |, \ in their source code (an issue partly addressed by trigraphs in C). On the other hand, an advantage of YUSCII is that it remains comparatively readable even when support for it is not available, similarly to the Russian KOI-7. Numerous attempts to replace it with something better kept failing due to limited support. Eventually, Microsoft's introduction of code pages, appearance of Unicode and availability of fonts finally spelled sure (but nevertheless still slow) end of YUSCII.

== Code page layout ==
Code points remained largely the same as in ASCII to maintain maximum compatibility. Following table shows allocation of character codes in YUSCII. Both Latin and Cyrillic glyphs are shown:

YUSCII
	0	1	2	3	4	5	6	7	8	9	A	B	C	D	E	F
0x	NUL	SOH	STX	ETX	EOT	ENQ	ACK	BEL	BS	HT	LF	VT	FF	CR	SO	SI
1x	DLE	DC1	DC2	DC3	DC4	NAK	SYN	ETB	CAN	EM	SUB	ESC	FS	GS	RS	US
2x	SP	!	"	#	$	%	&	'	(	)	*	+	,	-	.	/
3x	0	1	2	3	4	5	6	7	8	9	:	;	<	=	>	?
4x	Ž/Ж	A/А	B/Б	C/Ц	D/Д	E/Е	F/Ф	G/Г	H/Х	I/И	J/Ј	K/К	L/Л	M/М	N/Н	O/О
5x	P/П	Q/Љ	R/Р	S/С	T/Т	U/У	V/В	W/Њ	X/Џ	Y/Ѕ	Z/З	Š/Ш	Đ/Ђ/Ѓ	Ć/Ћ/Ќ	Č/Ч	_
6x	ž/ж	a/а	b/б	c/ц	d/д	e/е	f/ф	g/г	h/х	i/и	j/ј	k/к	l/л	m/м	n/н	o/о
7x	p/п	q/љ	r/р	s/с	t/т	u/у	v/в	w/њ	x/џ	y/ѕ	z/з	š/ш	đ/ђ/ѓ	ć/ћ/ќ	č/ч	DEL

Latin characters are different from ASCII

== World System Teletext ==
YUSCII should not be confused with the G0 Latin set for Serbian, Croatian and Slovene, or the G0 Cyrillic set for Serbian, defined by World System Teletext. Like YUSCII, these are based on ASCII and are where possible homologous with each other for Serbian letters. However, they make different decisions and consequently are not compatible with YUSCII. Macedonian letters Ќ and Ѓ are also assigned unique positions rather than the same as their Serbian equivalents, whereas the lowercase form of Џ and the Macedonian letter Ѕ are not supported. (Note: The Teletext G1 set for use with Cyrillic, listed in section 15.6.7 table 41 of the standard, contains a subset of Roman letters, mostly those without Cyrillic homoglyphs in the G0 sets. These include S.) The WST G0 sets are detailed below for reference.

World System Teletext G0 sets for Latin and Cyrillic script Serbian, Croatian and Slovene
	0	1	2	3	4	5	6	7	8	9	A	B	C	D	E	F
0x	NUL	SOH	STX	ETX	EOT	ENQ	ACK	BEL	BS	HT	LF	VT	FF	CR	SO	SI
1x	DLE	DC1	DC2	DC3	DC4	NAK	SYN	ETB	CAN	EM	SUB	ESC	FS	GS	RS	US
2x	SP	!	"	#	Ë/$	%	&	'	(	)	*	+	,	-	.	/
3x	0	1	2	3	4	5	6	7	8	9	:	;	<	=	>	?
4x	Č/Ч	A/А	B/Б	C/Ц	D/Д	E/Е	F/Ф	G/Г	H/Х	I/И	J/Ј	K/К	L/Л	M/М	N/Н	O/О
5x	P/П	Q/Ќ	R/Р	S/С	T/Т	U/У	V/В	W/Ѓ	X/Љ	Y/Њ	Z/З	Ć/Ћ	Ž/Ж	Đ/Ђ	Š/Ш	ë/Џ
6x	č/ч	a/а	b/б	c/ц	d/д	e/е	f/ф	g/г	h/х	i/и	j/ј	k/к	l/л	m/м	n/н	o/о
7x	p/п	q/ќ	r/р	s/с	t/т	u/у	v/в	w/ѓ	x/љ	y/њ	z/з	ć/ћ	ž/ж	đ/ђ	š/ш	■

Different from YUSCII

== See also ==
- KOI-7, Russian equivalent.
- Cyrillic script
- Scientific transliteration
- Iskra Delta Partner, a computer with built-in YUSCII
- Galaksija (computer) § Character ROM, yet another scheme replacing ASCII characters with otherwise-missing Serbian letters
