= ISO 5427 =

8-bit extension to the KOI-7 N1 character set

ISO 5427 is an 8-bit extension to the KOI-7 N1 character set, which was standardised by the ISO. The first half was published in 1979, and the second half was published in 1981. It supports the Russian (also before 1918), Belarusian, Bulgarian (also before 1945), Ukrainian, Macedonian, and Serbian languages. In July and October 1983, there were some revisions.

== Code table ==
ISO 5427
	0	1	2	3	4	5	6	7	8	9	A	B	C	D	E	F
2x	SP	!	"	#	¤ 00A4	%	&	'	(	)	*	+	,	-	.	/
3x	0	1	2	3	4	5	6	7	8	9	:	;	<	=	>	?
4x	ю 044E	а 0430	б 0431	ц 0446	д 0434	е 0435	ф 0444	г 0433	х 0445	и 0438	й 0439	к 043A	л 043B	м 043C	н 043D	о 043E
5x	п 043F	я 044F	р 0440	с 0441	т 0442	у 0443	ж 0436	в 0432	ь 044C	ы 044B	з 0437	ш 0448	э 044D	щ 0449	ч 0447	ъ 044A
6x	Ю 042E	А 0410	Б 0411	Ц 0426	Д 0414	Е 0415	Ф 0424	Г 0413	Х 0425	И 0418	Й 0419	К 041A	Л 041B	М 041C	Н 041D	О 041E
7x	П 041F	Я 042F	Р 0420	С 0421	Т 0422	У 0423	Ж 0416	В 0412	Ь 042C	Ы 042B	З 0417	Ш 0428	Э 042D	Щ 0429	Ч 0427	DEL
8x																
9x																
Ax																
Bx																
Cx	ґ 0491	ђ 0452	ѓ 0453	є 0454	ё 0451	ѕ 0455	і 0456	ї 0457	ј 0458	љ 0459	њ 045A	ћ 045B	ќ 045C	ў 045E	џ 045F	
Dx	ѣ 0463	ѳ 0473	ѵ 0475	ѫ 046B								[ 005B		] 005D		_ 005F
Ex	Ґ 0490	Ђ 0402	Ѓ 0403	Є 0404	Ё 0401	Ѕ 0405	І 0406	Ї 0407	Ј 0408	Љ 0409	Њ 040A	Ћ 040B	Ќ 040C	Ў 040E	Џ 040F	Ъ 042A
Fx	Ѣ 0462	Ѳ 0472	Ѵ 0474	Ѫ 046A												
