= Yugoslav Braille =

Braille alphabets used in ex-Yugoslavia

- Script type: Alphabet
- Print basis: Gaj's Latin alphabet Macedonian alphabet Slovene alphabet
- Languages: Serbo-Croatian, Slovene, Macedonian

Related scripts
- Parent systems: Braille: Yugoslav Braille

Yugoslav Braille is a family of closely related braille alphabets used for South Slavic languages of former Yugoslavia, namely Serbo-Croatian, Slovene and Macedonian. It is based on the unified international braille conventions, with the letters corresponding to their Latin transliterations.

== Alphabet ==
Braille	⠁ (braille pattern dots-1)	⠃ (braille pattern dots-12)	⠉ (braille pattern dots-14)	⠩ (braille pattern dots-146)	⠡ (braille pattern dots-16)	⠙ (braille pattern dots-145)	⠹ (braille pattern dots-1456)	⠻ (braille pattern dots-12456)	⠳ (braille pattern dots-1256)	⠑ (braille pattern dots-15)	⠋ (braille pattern dots-124)	⠛ (braille pattern dots-1245)	⠜ (braille pattern dots-345)
Serbian	а	б	ц	ћ	ч	д	ђ	џ	-	е	ф	г	-
Croatian	a	b	c	ć	č	d	đ	dž	-	e	f	g	-
Macedonian	а	б	ц	-	ч	д	-	џ	ѕ	е	ф	г	ѓ
Slovene	a	b	c	-	č	d	-	-	-	e	f	g	-
Braille	⠓ (braille pattern dots-125)	⠊ (braille pattern dots-24)	⠚ (braille pattern dots-245)	⠅ (braille pattern dots-13)	⠌ (braille pattern dots-34)	⠇ (braille pattern dots-123)	⠣ (braille pattern dots-126)	⠍ (braille pattern dots-134)	⠝ (braille pattern dots-1345)	⠫ (braille pattern dots-1246)	⠕ (braille pattern dots-135)	⠏ (braille pattern dots-1234)	
Serbian	х	и	ј	к	-	л	љ	м	н	њ	о	п	
Croatian	h	i	j	k	-	l	lj	m	n	nj	o	p	
Macedonian	х	и	ј	к	ќ	л	љ	м	н	њ	о	п	
Slovene	h	i	j	k	-	l	-	m	n	-	o	p	
Braille	⠟ (braille pattern dots-12345)	⠗ (braille pattern dots-1235)	⠎ (braille pattern dots-234)	⠱ (braille pattern dots-156)	⠞ (braille pattern dots-2345)	⠥ (braille pattern dots-136)	⠧ (braille pattern dots-1236)	⠺ (braille pattern dots-2456)	⠭ (braille pattern dots-1346)	⠽ (braille pattern dots-13456)	⠵ (braille pattern dots-1356)	⠮ (braille pattern dots-2346)	
Serbian	-	р	с	ш	т	у	в	-	-	-	з	ж	
Croatian	-	r	s	š	t	u	v	-	-	-	z	ž	
Macedonian	-	р	с	ш	т	у	в	-	-	-	з	ж	
Slovene	-	r	s	š	t	u	v	-	-	-	z	ž	

Accents (print accents illustrated on the letter e)
Print	è	ȅ	é	ȇ
Braille	⠈ (braille pattern dots-4)	⠐ (braille pattern dots-5)	⠘ (braille pattern dots-45)	⠰ (braille pattern dots-56)

== Punctuation ==
Unesco reports that Croatian Braille swaps the Serbian quotation marks for parentheses and the period/full stop for the apostrophe, but it's possible that this is due to a copy error; the table below follows Croatian Wikipedia, which agrees with Serbian, for these characters. There is less punctuation reported for Slovene and Macedonian Braille, but what there is matches Serbian conventions.

Blank cells in the tables are unattested.

Single punctuation:

Print	,	.	?	!	'	;	:	*	-	_	/	&	§ and ¶
Croatian	⠂ (braille pattern dots-2)	⠲ (braille pattern dots-256)	⠢ (braille pattern dots-26)	⠖ (braille pattern dots-235)	⠄ (braille pattern dots-3)	⠆ (braille pattern dots-23)	⠒ (braille pattern dots-25)	⠔ (braille pattern dots-35)	⠤ (braille pattern dots-36)		⠳ (braille pattern dots-1256)	⠯ (braille pattern dots-12346)	⠬ (braille pattern dots-346)
Serbian	⠂ (braille pattern dots-2)	⠲ (braille pattern dots-256)	⠢ (braille pattern dots-26)	⠖ (braille pattern dots-235)	⠄ (braille pattern dots-3)	⠆ (braille pattern dots-23)	⠒ (braille pattern dots-25)	⠔ (braille pattern dots-35)	⠤ (braille pattern dots-36)	⠠ (braille pattern dots-6) ⠤ (braille pattern dots-36)	⠌ (braille pattern dots-34)		

Paired punctuation:

Print	“…”	‘…’	(…)	[…]	{…}
Croatian	...	...	...	...	
Serbian	...	...	...	...	...

== Formatting ==
⠼ (braille pattern dots-3456)	⠠ (braille pattern dots-6)	⠨ (braille pattern dots-46)	⠘ (braille pattern dots-45)	⠠ (braille pattern dots-6)	⠸ (braille pattern dots-456)	⠌ (braille pattern dots-34)
(num.)	(end num.)	(Caps)	(CAPS)	(l.c.)	(emph.)	(super- script)

The superscript is reported for Croatian Braille; in Serbian Braille, ⠌ is used for the virgule /. In Slovene Braille, the emphasis (bold/italic) marker ⠸ is reported to be an abbreviation sign.

Croatian Wikipedia states that ⠠ is used for capital letters.
