= ISO 9 =

International standard

ISO 9 is an international standard establishing a system for the transliteration into Latin characters of Cyrillic characters constituting the alphabets of many Slavic and non-Slavic languages.

Published on February 23, 1995 by the International Organization for Standardization, the major advantage ISO 9 has over other competing systems is its univocal system of one character for one character equivalents (by the use of diacritics), which faithfully represents the original spelling and allows for reverse transliteration, even if the language is unknown.

Earlier versions of the standard, ISO/R 9:1954, ISO/R 9:1968 and ISO 9:1986, were more closely based on the international scholarly system for linguistics (scientific transliteration), but have diverged in favour of unambiguous transliteration over phonemic representation. The edition of 1995 supersedes the edition of 1986. As of 2026, A draft international standard is under developing to replace ISO 9:1995.

== ISO 9:1995 ==
The standard features three mapping tables: the first covers contemporary Slavic languages, the second older Slavic orthographies (excluding letters from the first), and the third non-Slavic languages (including most letters from the first). Several Cyrillic characters included in ISO 9 are not available as pre-composed characters in Unicode, nor are some of the transliterations; combining diacritical marks have to be used in these cases. Unicode, on the other hand, includes some historic characters that are not dealt with in ISO 9.

=== Transliteration table ===
The following combined table shows characters for various Slavic, Iranian, Romance, Turkic, Uralic, Mongolic, Caucasian, Tungusic, Paleosiberian and other languages of the former USSR which are written in Cyrillic.

ISO 9:1995
| Cyrillic | | Latin | | | | |
| Char | | Char | | Unicode | | Description |
|---|---|---|---|---|---|---|
| А | а | A | a | | | |
| Ӓ | ӓ | Ä | ä | 00C4 | 00E4 | a diaeresis |
| А̄̈ | а̄̈ | Ạ̈ | ạ̈ | 1EA0+308 | 1EA1+308 | a diaeresis and dot below |
| Ӑ | ӑ | Ă | ă | 0102 | 0103 | a breve |
| А̄ | а̄ | Ā | ā | 0100 | 0101 | a macron |
| Ӕ | ӕ | Æ | æ | 00C6 | 00E6 | ae ligature |
| А́ | а́ | Á | á | 00C1 | 00E1 | a acute |
| А̊ | а̊ | Å | å | 00C5 | 00E5 | a ring |
| Б | б | B | b | | | |
| В | в | V | v | | | |
| Г | г | G | g | | | |
| Ґ | ґ | G̀ | g̀ | 0047+0300 | 0067+0300 | g grave |
| Ѓ | ѓ | Ǵ | ǵ | 01F4 | 01F5 | g acute |
| Ғ | ғ | Ġ | ġ | 0120 | 0121 | g dot |
| Ҕ | ҕ | Ğ | ğ | 011E | 011F | g breve |
| Һ | һ | Ḥ | ḥ | 1E24 | 1E25 | h dot |
| Д | д | D | d | | | |
| Ђ | ђ | Đ | đ | 0110 | 0111 | d stroke |
| Е | е | E | e | | | |
| Ӗ | ӗ | Ĕ | ĕ | 0114 | 0115 | e breve |
| Ё | ё | Ë | ë | 00CB | 00EB | e diaeresis |
| Є | є | Ê | ê | 00CA | 00EA | e circumflex |
| Ж | ж | Ž | ž | 017D | 017E | z caron |
| Җ | җ | Ž̦ | ž̦ | 017D+0326 | 017E+0326 | z caron and comma below |
| Җ | җ | Ž̧ | ž̧ | 017D+0327 | 017E+0327 | z caron and cedilla |
| Ӝ | ӝ | Z̄ | z̄ | 005A+0304 | 007A+0304 | z macron |
| Ӂ | ӂ | Z̆ | z̆ | 005A+0306 | 007A+0306 | z breve |
| З | з | Z | z | | | |
| Ҙ | ҙ | Z̦ | z̦ | 005A+0326 | 007A+0326 | z comma below |
| Ҙ | ҙ | Z̧ | z̧ | 005A+0327 | 007A+0327 | z cedilla |
| Ӟ | ӟ | Z̈ | z̈ | 005A+0308 | 007A+0308 | z diaeresis |
| Ӡ | ӡ | Ź | ź | 0179 | 017A | z acute |
| Ѕ | ѕ | Ẑ | ẑ | 1E90 | 1E91 | z circumflex |
| И | и | I | i | | | |
| Ӣ | ӣ | Ī | ī | 012A | 012B | i macron |
| И́ | и́ | Í | í | 00CD | 00ED | i acute |
| Ӥ | ӥ | Î | î | 00CE | 00EE | i circumflex |
| Й | й | J | j | | | |
| І | і | Ì | ì | 00CC | 00EC | i grave |
| Ї | ї | Ï | ï | 00CF | 00EF | i diaeresis |
| І̵ | і̵ | Ǐ | ǐ | 01CF | 01D0 | i caron |
| Ј | ј | J̌ | ǰ | 004A+030C | 01F0 | j caron |
| Ј̵ | ј̵ | J́ | j́ | 004A+0301 | 006A+0301 | j acute |
| К | к | K | k | | | |
| Ќ | ќ | Ḱ | ḱ | 1E30 | 1E31 | k acute |
| Ӄ | ӄ | Ḳ | ḳ | 1E32 | 1E33 | k dot below |
| Ҝ | ҝ | K̂ | k̂ | 004B+0302 | 006B+0302 | k circumflex |
| Ҡ | ҡ | Ǩ | ǩ | 01E8 | 01E9 | k caron |
| Ҟ | ҟ | K̄ | k̄ | 004B+0304 | 006B+0304 | k macron |
| Қ | қ | K̦ | k̦ | 004B+0326 | 006B+0326 | k comma below |
| Қ | қ | Ķ | ķ | 0136 | 0137 | k cedilla |
| К̨ | к̨ | K̀ | k̀ | 004B+0300 | 006B+0300 | k grave |
| Ԛ | ԛ | Q | q | | | |
| Л | л | L | l | | | |
| Лʼ | лʼ | Ĺ | ĺ | 0139 | 013A | l acute |
| Љ | љ | L̂ | l̂ | 004C+0302 | 006C+0302 | l circumflex |
| Ԡ | ԡ | L̦ | l̦ | 004C+0326 | 006C+0326 | l comma below |
| Ԡ | ԡ | Ļ | ļ | 013B | 013C | l cedilla |
| М | м | M | m | | | |
| Н | н | N | n | | | |
| Њ | њ | N̂ | n̂ | 004E+0302 | 006E+0302 | n circumflex |
| Ң | ң | N̦ | n̦ | 004E+0326 | 006E+0326 | n comma below |
| Ң | ң | Ņ | ņ | 0145 | 0146 | n cedilla |
| Ӊ | ӊ | Ṇ | ṇ | 1E46 | 1E47 | n dot below |
| Ҥ | ҥ | Ṅ | ṅ | 1E44 | 1E45 | n dot |
| Н̨ | н̨ | Ǹ | ǹ | 01F8 | 01F9 | n grave |
| Ԣ | ԣ | Ń | ń | 0143 | 0144 | n acute |
| Ӈ | ӈ | Ň | ň | 0147 | 0148 | n caron |
| Н̄ | н̄ | N̄ | n̄ | 004E+0304 | 006E+0304 | n macron |
| О | о | O | o | | | |
| Ӧ | ӧ | Ö | ö | 00D6 | 00F6 | o diaeresis |
| Ө | ө | Ô | ô | 00D4 | 00F4 | o circumflex |
| Ӫ | ӫ | Ő | ő | 0150 | 0151 | o double acute |
| О̄̈ | о̄̈ | Ọ̈ | ọ̈ | 1ECC+0308 | 1ECD+0308 | o diaeresis and dot below |
| Ҩ | ҩ | Ò | ò | 00D2 | 00F2 | o grave |
| О́ | о́ | Ó | ó | 00D3 | 00F3 | o acute |
| О̄ | о̄ | Ō | ō | 014C | 014D | o macron |
| Œ | œ | Œ | œ | 0152 | 0153 | oe ligature |
| П | п | P | p | | | |
| Ҧ | ҧ | Ṕ | ṕ | 1E54 | 1E55 | p acute |
| Ԥ | ԥ | P̀ | p̀ | 0050+0300 | 0070+0300 | p grave |
| Р | р | R | r | | | |
| С | с | S | s | | | |
| Ҫ | ҫ | Ș | ș | 0218 | 0219 | s comma below |
| Ҫ | ҫ | Ş | ş | 015E | 015F | s cedilla |
| С̀ | с̀ | S̀ | s̀ | 0053+0300 | 0073+0300 | s grave |
| Т | т | T | t | | | |
| Ћ | ћ | Ć | ć | 0106 | 0107 | c acute |
| Т̧ | т̧ | T̀ | t̀ | 0054+0300 | 0074+0300 | t grave |
| Т̌ | т̌ | Ť | t͏̌ | 0164 | 0165 | t caron |
| Ҭ | ҭ | Ț | ț | 021A | 021B | t comma below |
| Ҭ | ҭ | Ţ | ţ | 0162 | 0163 | t cedilla |
| У | у | U | u | | | |
| Ӱ | ӱ | Ü | ü | 00DC | 00FC | u diaeresis |
| Ӯ | ӯ | Ū | ū | 016A | 016B | u macron |
| Ў | ў | Ŭ | ŭ | 016C | 016D | u breve |
| Ӳ | ӳ | Ű | ű | 0170 | 0171 | u double acute |
| У́ | у́ | Ú | ú | 00DA | 00FA | u acute |
| Ӯ̈ | ӯ̈ | Ụ̈ | ụ̈ | 1EE4+308 | 1EE5+308 | u diaeresis and dot below |
| Ү | ү | Ù | ù | 00D9 | 00F9 | u grave |
| Ұ | ұ | U̇ | u̇ | 0055+0307 | 0075+0307 | u dot |
| Ӱ̄ | ӱ̄ | Ụ̄ | ụ̄ | 1EE4+304 | 1EE5+304 | u macron and dot below |
| Ԝ | ԝ | W | w | | | |
| Ф | ф | F | f | | | |
| Х | х | H | h | | | |
| Ҳ | ҳ | H̦ | h̦ | 0048+0326 | 0068+0326 | h comma below |
| Ҳ | ҳ | Ḩ | ḩ | 1E28 | 1E29 | h cedilla |
| Ц | ц | C | c | | | |
| Ҵ | ҵ | C̄ | c̄ | 0043+0304 | 0063+0304 | c macron |
| Џ | џ | D̂ | d̂ | 0044+0302 | 0064+0302 | d circumflex |
| Ч | ч | Č | č | 010C | 010D | c caron |
| Ҷ | ҷ | C̦ | c̦ | 0043+0326 | 0063+0326 | c comma below |
| Ҷ | ҷ | Ç | ç | 00C7 | 00E7 | c cedilla |
| Ӌ | ӌ | C̣ | c̣ | 0043+0323 | 0063+0323 | c dot below |
| Ӵ | ӵ | C̈ | c̈ | 0043+0308 | 0063+0308 | c diaeresis |
| Ҹ | ҹ | Ĉ | ĉ | 0108 | 0109 | c circumflex |
| Ч̀ | ч̀ | C̀ | c̀ | 0043+0300 | 0063+0300 | c grave |
| Ҽ | ҽ | C̆ | c̆ | 0043+0306 | 0063+0306 | c breve |
| Ҿ | ҿ | C̨̆ | c̨̆ | 0043+0328+0306 | 0063+0328+0306 | c comma below and breve |
| Ш | ш | Š | š | 0160 | 0161 | s caron |
| Щ | щ | Ŝ | ŝ | 015C | 015D | s circumflex |
| Ъ | ъ | ʺ | | 02BA | | modifier letter double prime |
| Ы | ы | Y | y | | | |
| Ӹ | ӹ | Ÿ | ÿ | 0178 | 00FF | y diaeresis |
| Ы̄ | ы̄ | Ȳ | ȳ | 0232 | 0233 | y macron |
| Ь | ь | ʹ | | 02B9 | | modifier letter prime (Note: It's common for people to substitute U+2032 ′ PRIME instead of U+02B9 ʹ MODIFIER LETTER PRIME, but not preferred by Unicode.) |
| Э | э | È | è | 00C8 | 00E8 | e grave |
| Ә | ә | A̋ | a̋ | 0041+030B | 0061+030B | a double acute |
| Ӛ | ӛ | À | à | 00C0 | 00E0 | a grave |
| Ю | ю | Û | û | 00DB | 00FB | u circumflex |
| Ю̄ | ю̄ | Ů | ů | 00DB+0304 | 00FB+0304 | u circumflex and macron |
| Я | я | Â | â | 00C2 | 00E2 | a circumflex |
| Ѣ | ѣ | Ě | ě | 011A | 011B | e caron |
| Ѫ | ѫ | Ǎ | ǎ | 01CD | 01CE | a caron |
| Ѳ | ѳ | F̀ | f̀ | 0046+0300 | 0066+0300 | f grave |
| Ѵ | ѵ | Ỳ | ỳ | 1EF2 | 1EF3 | y grave |
| Ӏ | | ‡ | | 2021 | | double dagger |
| ʼ | | ` | | 02CB | | grave accent |
| ˮ | | ¨ | | 02EE | | diaeresis |

=== National adoptions ===
| Date | Region | Name | Descriptive name |
|---|---|---|---|
| 1995-06-01 | France | NF ISO 9:1995-06-01 | Information et documentation - Translittération des caractères cyrilliques en caractères latins - Langues slaves et non slaves. |
| 1995-09-29 | Sweden | SS-ISO 9 | Translitterering av kyrilliska bokstäver till latinska - Slaviska och icke-slaviska språk |
| 1997 | Romania | SR ISO 9:1997 | Informare și documentare. Transliterarea caracterelor chirilice în caractere latine. Limbi slave și neslave |
| 1997-12-15 | Croatia | HRN ISO 9:1997 | Informacije i dokumentacija – Transliteracija ćiriličnih u latinične znakove za slavenske i neslavenske jezike (ISO 9:1995) |
| 2000 | Poland | PN-ISO 9:2000 | Informacja i dokumentacja. Transliteracja znaków cyrylickich na znaki łacińskie — Języki słowiańskie i niesłowiańskie |
| 2002 | Lithuania | LST ISO 9:2002 | Informacija ir dokumentai. Kirilicos rašmenų transliteravimas lotyniškais rašmenimis. Slavų ir ne slavų kalbos |
| 2002-07-01 | Russia | GOST 7.79-2000 System A | Система стандартов по информации, библиотечному и издательскому делу. Правила транслитерации кирилловского письма латинским алфавитом |
| 2002-10 | Czechia | ČSN ISO 9 (010185) | Informace a dokumentace - Transliterace cyrilice do latinky - slovanské a neslovanské jazyky |
| 2005-03-01 | Italy | UNI ISO 9:2005 | Informazione e documentazione - Traslitterazione dei caratteri cirillici in caratteri latini - Linguaggi slavi e non slavi |
| 2005-11-01 | Slovenia | SIST ISO 9:2005 | Informatika in dokumentacija – Transliteracija ciriličnih znakov v latinične znake – Slovanski in neslovanski jeziki |
| 2011 | Estonia | EVS-ISO 9:2011 | Informatsioon ja dokumentatsioon. Kirillitsa translitereerimine ladina keelde. Slaavi ja mitte-slaavi keeled |
| 2013 | GCC: Bahrain, Kuwait, Oman, Qatar, Saudi Arabia, United Arab Emirates | GSO ISO 9:2013 | التوثيق والمعلومات - الحروف السير يليه بترجمة إلى اللغة اللاتينية - السلافيه وغير اللغات السلافيه |

=== Sample text ===
The following text is a fragment of the Preamble of the Universal Declaration of Human Rights in Bulgarian:

| Като взе предвид, че признаването на достойнството, присъщо на всички членове на човешкия род, на техните равни и неотменими права представлява основа на свободата, справедливостта и мира в света, | Kato vze predvid, če priznavaneto na dostojnstvoto, prisʺŝo na vsički členove na čoveškiâ rod, na tehnite ravni i neotmenimi prava predstavlâva osnova na svobodata, spravedlivostta i mira v sveta, |

== ISO/R 9 ==
ISO Recommendation No. 9, published 1954 and revised 1968, is an older version of the standard, with different transliteration for different Slavic languages, reflecting their phonemic differences. It is closer to the original international system of Slavist scientific transliteration.

A German adaptation of this standard was published by the Deutsches Institut für Normung as DIN 1460 (1982) for Slavic languages and supplemented by DIN 1460-2 (2010) for non-Slavic languages.

The languages covered are Russian (RU), Belarusian (BE), Ukrainian (UK), Bulgarian (BG), Serbo-Croatian (SH) and Macedonian (MK). For comparison, ISO 9:1995 is shown in the table below.

Alternative schemes: ISO/R 9:1968 permits some deviations from the main standard. In the table below, they are listed in the columns alternative 1 and alternative 2.

1. The first sub-standard defines some language-dependent transliterations for Russian (RU), Ukrainian (UK), Belarusian (BE) and Bulgarian (BG).
2. The second sub-standard permits, in countries where tradition favours it, a set of alternative transliterations, but only as a group. It is identical to the British Standard 2979:1958 for Cyrillic romanization.

ISO/R 9:1954, ISO/R 9:1968 and ISO 9:1995
| Cyrillic | ISO/R 9 1954 | ISO/R 9 1968 | | | ISO 9 1995 | Usage per language | | | | | |
| Cyrillic | ISO/R 9 1954 | base | alt. 1 | alt. 2 | ISO 9 1995 | RU | BE | UK | BG | SH | MK |
|---|---|---|---|---|---|---|---|---|---|---|---|
| А а | A a | | | | A a | Yes | | | | | |
| Б б | B b | | | | B b | Yes | | | | | |
| В в | V v | | | | V v | Yes | | | | | |
| Г г | G g | G g | H h (BE, UK) | | G g | Yes | Regional | | Yes | | |
| Ґ ґ | Ġ ġ | G g | | | G̀ g̀ | No | | Yes | No | | |
| Д д | D d | | | | D d | Yes | | | | | |
| Ѓ ѓ | Ǵ ǵ | | | | Ǵ ǵ | No | | | | | Yes |
| Ђ ђ | Đ đ | | | | Đ đ | No | | | | Yes | No |
| Е е | E e | | | | E e | Yes | | | | | |
| Ё ё | Ë ë | | | | Ë ë | Yes | | No | | | |
| Є є | Je je | | | | Ê ê | No | | Yes | No | | |
| Ж ж | Ž ž | | | Zh zh | Ž ž | Yes | | | | | |
| З з | Z z | | | | Z z | Yes | | | | | |
| Ѕ ѕ | Dz dz | | | | Ẑ ẑ | No | | | | | Yes |
| И и | I i, Y y | I i | Y y (UK) | | I i | Yes | No | Regional | Yes | | |
| I і | I i | Ī ī | I i (BE, UK) | | Ì ì | Archaic | Yes | | No | | |
| Ї ї | Ji ji | Ï ï | | | Ï ï | No | | Yes | No | | |
| Й й | J j | | | Ĭ ĭ | J j | Yes | | | | No | |
| Ј ј | J j | | Ĵ ĵ | Y y | J̌ ǰ | No | | | | Yes | |
| К к | K k | | | | K k | Yes | | | | | |
| Л л | L l | | | | L l | Yes | | | | | |
| Љ љ | Lj lj | | Ĺ ĺ | | L̂ l̂ | No | | | | Yes | |
| М м | M m | | | | M m | Yes | | | | | |
| Н н | N n | | | | N n | Yes | | | | | |
| Њ њ | Nj nj | | Ń ń | | N̂ n̂ | No | | | | Yes | |
| О о | O o | | | | O o | Yes | | | | | |
| П п | P p | | | | P p | Yes | | | | | |
| Р р | R r | | | | R r | Yes | | | | | |
| С с | S s | | | | S s | Yes | | | | | |
| Т т | T t | | | | T t | Yes | | | | | |
| Ќ ќ | Ḱ ḱ | | | | Ḱ ḱ | No | | | | | Yes |
| Ћ ћ | Ć ć | | | | Ć ć | No | | | | Yes | No |
| У у | U u | | | | U u | Yes | | | | | |
| Ў ў | Ŭ ŭ | | | | Ŭ ŭ | No | Yes | No | | | |
| Ф ф | F f | | | | F f | Yes | | | | | |
| Х х | H h | | Ch ch (BE, RU, UK) | Kh kh | H h | Regional | | | Yes | | |
| Ц ц | C c | | | Ts ts | C c | Yes | | | | | |
| Ч ч | Č č | | | Ch ch | Č č | Yes | | | | | |
| Џ џ | Dž dž | | Dj dj | Dĵ dĵ | D̂ d̂ | No | | | | Yes | |
| Ш ш | Š š | | | Sh sh | Š š | Yes | | | | | |
| Щ щ | Šč šč, Št št | Šč šč | Št št (BG) | Shch shch | Ŝ ŝ | Yes | No | Yes | Regional | No | |
| Ъ ъ | Ă ă, " | ʺ | Ă ă (BG) | | ʺ | Yes | Archaic | | Regional | No | |
| Ы ы | Y y | | | | Y y | Yes | | No | | | |
| Ь ь | ʹ | | | | ʹ | Yes | | | | No | |
| Ѣ ѣ | Ě ě | | | | Ě ě | Archaic | | | | No | |
| Э э | E̊ e̊ | | | | È è | Yes | | No | | | |
| Ю ю | Ju ju | | | Yu yu | Û û | Yes | | | | No | |
| Я я | Ja ja | | | Ya ya | Â â | Yes | | | | No | |
| ’ | ", ’ | ″ | | | ’ | Archaic | Yes | | No | | Regional |
| Ѫ ѫ | Ȧ ȧ | ʺ̣ | Ȧ ȧ (BG) | | Ǎ ǎ | No | | | Archaic | No | |
| Ѳ ѳ | Ḟ ḟ | | | | F̀ f̀ | Archaic | No | | | | |
| Ѵ ѵ | Ẏ ẏ | | | | Ỳ ỳ | Archaic | No | | | | |

== See also ==
- Romanization of Russian – Romanization of the Russian alphabet
- List of ISO transliterations
- GOST standards – CIS technical standards
- Romanization of Ukrainian – Representation of the Ukrainian language using Latin letters

== Notes ==
| Preceded by ISO 8 | Lists of ISOs; ISO 9 | Succeeded by ISO 10 |
