= GOST 10859 =

Soviet character encoding standard

GOST 10859 (1964) is a standard of the Soviet Union which defined how to encode data on punched cards. This standard allowed a variable word size, depending on the type of data being encoded, but only uppercase characters.

These include the non-ASCII "decimal exponent symbol" ⏨. It was used to express real numbers in scientific notation. For example: 6.0221415⏨23.

The ⏨ character was also part of the ALGOL programming language specifications and was incorporated into the then German character encoding standard ALCOR. GOST 10859 also included numerous other non-ASCII characters/symbols useful to ALGOL programmers, e.g.: ∨, ∧, ⊃, ≡, ¬, ≠, ↑, ↓, ×, ÷, ≤, ≥, °, &, ∅, compare with ALGOL operators.

== Character sets ==
GOST 10859 4-bit code: Binary-coded decimal
	0	1	2	3	4	5	6	7	8	9	A	B	C	D	E	F
0x	0	1	2	3	4	5	6	7	8	9	+	-	/	,	.	DEL

GOST 10859 5-bit code: with BCD & mathematical operators
	0	1	2	3	4	5	6	7	8	9	A	B	C	D	E	F
0x	0	1	2	3	4	5	6	7	8	9	+	-	/	,	.	SP
1x	⏨	↑	(	)	×	=	;	[	]	*	‘	’	≠	<	>	DEL

GOST 10859 6-bit code: with only Cyrillic upper-case letters
	0	1	2	3	4	5	6	7	8	9	A	B	C	D	E	F
0x	0	1	2	3	4	5	6	7	8	9	+	-	/	,	.	SP
1x	⏨	↑	(	)	×	=	;	[	]	*	‘	’	≠	<	>	:
2x	А	Б	В	Г	Д	Е	Ж	З	И	Й	К	Л	М	Н	О	П
3x	Р	С	Т	У	Ф	Х	Ц	Ч	Ш	Щ	Ы	Ь	Э	Ю	Я	DEL

GOST 10859 7-bit code: Cyrillic and Latin upper-case letters
	0	1	2	3	4	5	6	7	8	9	A	B	C	D	E	F
0x	0	1	2	3	4	5	6	7	8	9	+	-	/	,	.	SP
1x	⏨	↑	(	)	×	=	;	[	]	*	‘	’	≠	<	>	:
2x	А	Б	В	Г	Д	Е	Ж	З	И	Й	К	Л	М	Н	О	П
3x	Р	С	Т	У	Ф	Х	Ц	Ч	Ш	Щ	Ы	Ь	Э	Ю	Я	D
4x	F	G	I	J	L	N	Q	R	S	U	V	W	Z	‾	≤	≥
5x	∨	∧	⊃	¬	÷	≡	%	◊	|	—	_	!	"	Ъ	°	'
6x	→	←	?	↓	∅	±	∇									
7x																DEL
Cyrillic and Latin letters with identical (A, B, C, E, H, K, M, O, P, T, X) and similar (Y/У) glyphs were unified.

GOST 10859 6-bit code: with only Latin upper-case letters
	0	1	2	3	4	5	6	7	8	9	A	B	C	D	E	F
0x	0	1	2	3	4	5	6	7	8	9	+	-	/	,	.	SP
1x	⏨	↑	(	)	×	=	;	[	]	*	‘	’	≠	<	>	:
2x	A	B	C	D	E	F	G	H	I	J	K	L	M	N	O	P
3x	Q	R	S	T	U	V	W	X	Y	Z	∨	∧	⊃	¬	÷	DEL

== See also ==
- KOI-7 (GOST 13052-67)
- KOI-8 (GOST 19768-74)
