= List of GOST standards =

GOST (Russian: ГОСТ) refers to a set of international technical standards maintained by the Euro-Asian Council for Standardization, Metrology and Certification (EASC), a regional standards organization operating under the auspices of the Commonwealth of Independent States (CIS).

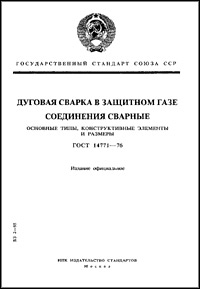
Cover page of a Soviet-era GOST standard (arc welding in protective atmosphere)

GOST standards were originally developed by the government of the Soviet Union as part of its national standardization strategy. The word GOST (Russian: ГОСТ) is an acronym for gosudarstvennyy standart (Russian: государственный стандарт), which means state standard or governmental standard.

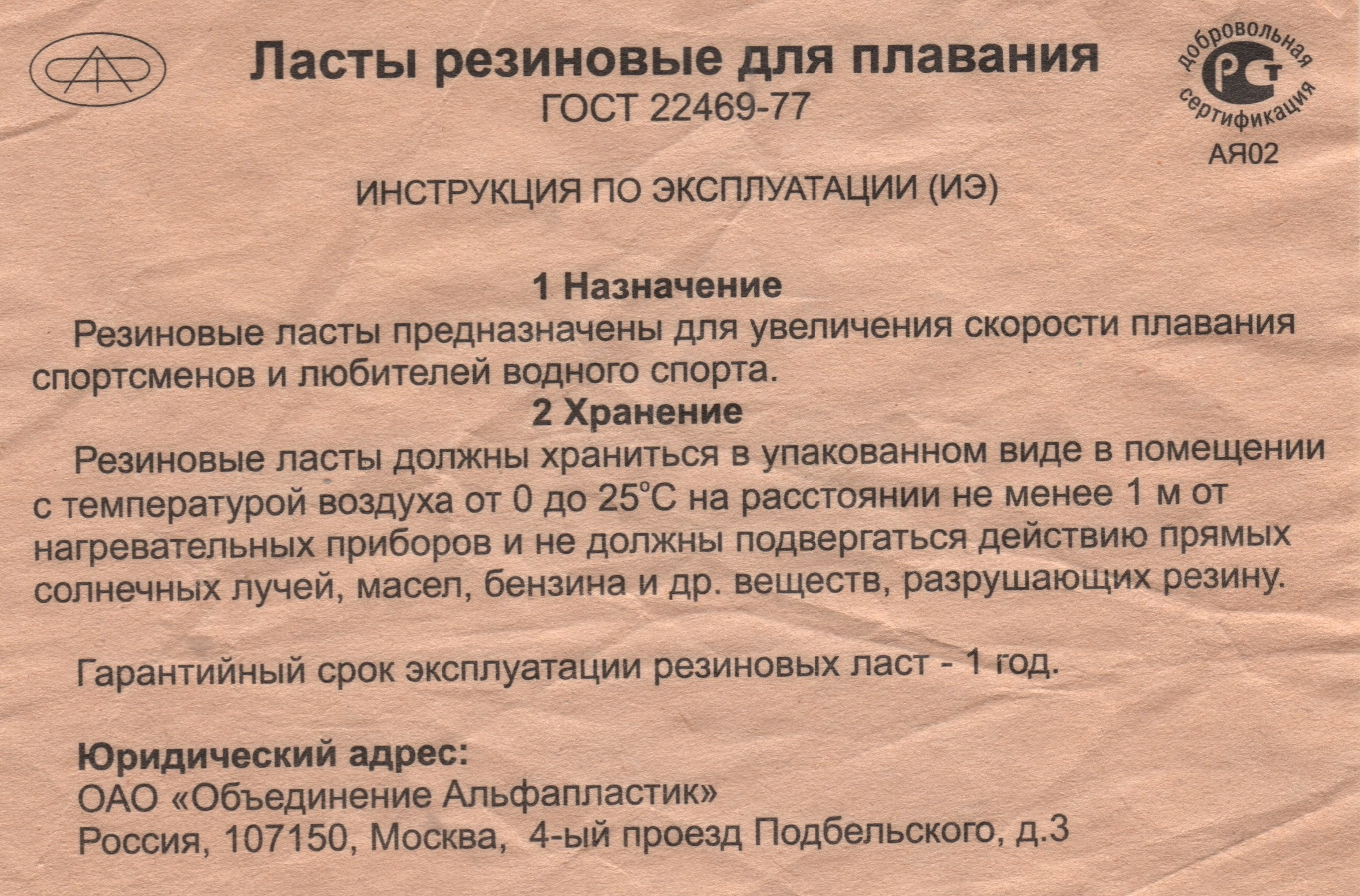
Instruction slip enclosed with Russian-manufactured swim fins certifying voluntary compliance with Soviet and post-Soviet GOST 22469-77 product standard

== GOST Standards ==
- GOST 2.109-73: Unified system for design documentation. Basic requirements for drawing
- GOST 2.123-93: Unified system for design documentation. Sets of design documents for printing plates under automated design
- GOST 7.67-94: System of standards on information librarianship and publishing. Codes of names of countries
- GOST 7.79-2000: Standard for transliteration from Cyrillic to Latin script for use on the internet, for speakers of languages that are normally written in Cyrillic script but who do not have access to a Cyrillic keyboard.
- GOST 2187-79: Diving weights. Specifications
- GOST 2817-45: Transparent sublayer photographic materials. Method of general sensitometric test
- GOST 2583-70: Manganese-zinc dry galvanic cells. Technical specifications.
- GOST 3303-82: Rubber hot-water bottles
- GOST 4805-49: Rubber boots
- GOST 5284-84: Canned meat "stewed beef"
- GOST 5461-59 and 13393-76 Electronic electro-vacuum and semiconductor devices. Ion instruments. Designation system
- GOST 7396-69: Plug-in connectors, double-pole with cylindrical contacts
- GOST 9155-88: Rubber and rubbertextile sports footwear (moulded and injection moulded). Specifications
- GOST 10585-99: Oil fuel. Mazut
- GOST 10859-64: Computing machines. Alphanumeric codes for punched cards and punched tapes A 1964 character set for computers, includes non-ASCII/non-Unicode characters required when programming in the ALGOL programming language.
- GOST 11828-86: Rotating electrical machines. General test methods
- GOST 13052-64: Computing machines and data transfer equipment. 7-bit codes for information exchange
- GOST 13393-76: Electric vacuum devices. Identification code
- GOST 14771-76: Gas-shielded arc welding. Welded joints. Main types, design elements and dimensions
- GOST 15150-69: Machines, instruments and other industrial products. Modifications for different climatic regions. Categories, operating, storage and transportation conditions as to environment climatic aspects influence
- GOST 16876-71: Rules of transliteration of the Cyrillic alphabet letters using the Latin alphabet letters
- GOST 18682-73: Integrated circuits. Classification and reference designation system
- GOST 19768-74: Computer machines and data processing systems. 8-bit codes for information exchange and processing
- GOST 20568-75: Rubber masks for submarine swimming
- GOST 22469-77: Swimming rubber flippers
- GOST 26765.52-87: Bus serial interface for system of electronic modules. General requirements
- GOST 27463-87: Information processing systems. 7-Bit coded character sets
- GOST 27974-88: Programming language ALGOL 68
- GOST 27975-88: Programming language ALGOL 68 extended
- GOST 28147-89: Block cipher – commonly referred to as just GOST in cryptography
- GOST 32569-2013: Steel pipe technology. Requirements for design and operation of explosive and chemically dangerous production
- GOST 32410-2013: Emergency crash-systems railway rolling stock for passenger transportations. Technical requirements and methods of control

== GOST R Standards ==
GOST R, or Russian certification system, is a subset of GOST standards that is valid only in the territory of the Russian Federation, in contrast to the GOST standards, used across all CIS countries, including Russia.

- GOST R 1.5-2012: Standardization in Russian Federation. National Standards. Rules of structure, drafting, presentation and indication
- GOST R 1.13-2001: State system for standardization of Russian Federation. Procedure of notifications preparation on projects of normative documents
- GOST R 8.932-2017: State system for ensuring the uniformity of measurements. Requirement to methodologies (to the methods) of measuring in area of uses of nuclear-power. Substantive provisions
- GOST R 21.1101-2013: System of design documents for construction. Main requirements for design and working documents
- GOST R 34.11-94: Information technology. Cryptographic data security. Hashing function
- GOST R 34.12-2015: Information technology. Cryptographic data security. Block ciphers
- GOST R 42.7.01-2021 Civil defense. Emergency disposal of the dead in wartime and peace time. General requirements
- GOST R 60.2.2.1-2016: Robots and robotic devices. Safety requirements for personal care robots
- GOST R 50696-2006: Domestic cooking appliances burning gas. General technical requirements and test methods
- GOST R 52070-2003: Bus serial interface of electronic modules system. General requirements
- GOST R 50860-96: Aircraft and helicopters. Antenna feeder devices of connection, navigation, landing and air traffic control. General specification, parameters, methods of measurements
- GOST R 51555-99: Toys. General safety requirements and methods of tests. Mechanical and physical properties
- GOST R 52888-2007: Social services of the population. Social services to children
- GOST R 52630-2012: Steel welded vessels and apparatus. General specifications
- GOST R 52936-2008: Free-flow diving suits. General technical requirements
- GOST R 53279-2009: Fire equipment. Fire connecting heads. General technical requirements. Methods of testing
- GOST R 53574-2009: Noise. Assessment of noise annoyance by means of social and socio-acoustic surveys
- GOST R 53685-2009: Electrification and electric supply of the railways. Terms and definitions
- GOST R 53865-2010: Gas distribution systems. Terms and definitions
- GOST R 53940-2010: Cash register machines. General requirements for product and its application procedure
- GOST R 53953-2010: Railway telecommunication. Terms and definitions
- GOST R 54382-2011: Oil and gas industry. Submarine pipeline systems. General requirements
- GOST R 54435-2011: Wind power plant constructions. Base safety requirements
- GOST R 54594-2011: Offshore platforms. Rules of Inhabitation. General requirements
- GOST R 55967-2014: Lifts. Special safety requirements for the installation new lifts in existing buildings
- GOST R 56066-2014: Safety of amusement rides. Methods of measuring the acceleration acting on the passenger rides
- GOST R 56436-2015: Gymnastic equipment. Rings. Functional requirements, safety requirements and test methods
- GOST R 56825-2021: Intellectual property. Management at the State Academy of Sciences
- GOST R 57725-2017: Activities of legislative (representative) bodies of the constituent entities of the Russian Federation elected officials assistants. General requirements
- GOST R 57841-2017: Mining equipment. Belt conveyor rollers. General specifications
- GOST R 58783-2019: Conducting research in the polar regions. Terms and Definitions
- GOST R 59201-2021: Roads of public roads. Major repair, repair and maintenance. Technical rules
- GOST R 59488-2021: Automobile roads for general use. Bridge structures. Calculation rules for reinforcing reinforced concrete beam spans
- GOST R 59769-2021: Medical products. Risk management. Guidance for planning the risk analysis and assessment process
- GOST R 70033-2022: Earth Remote Sensing from Space. Data of Earth Remote Sensing from Space. General requirements to freely distributable data
- GOST R 70177-2022: Internet resources and other information presented in electronic digital form. User agents. Principles of accessibility for people with disabilities and other persons with disabilities
