= KOI-7 =

Character encoding system for Russian

Short KOI
- Kermit: SHORT-KOI
- Alias(es): KOI-7 N2, ВКД
- Language: Russian
- Standard: GOST 13052, GOST 27463
- Classification: 7-bit KOI encoding
- Preceded by: MTK-2
- Succeeded by: KOI-8
- Other related encodings: YUSCII, ISO 646

KOI-7 Switched
- MIME / IANA: KOI7-switched
- Alias(es): csKOI7switched
- Language: Russian
- Standard: GOST 13052, GOST 27463
- Classification: 7-bit stateful KOI encoding
- Transforms / Encodes: ISO 646:IRV (shift-in); KOI-7 N1 (shift-out)
- Preceded by: MTK-2
- Succeeded by: KOI-8
- Other related encodings: YUSCII, ISO 5427

KOI-7 (Russian: Код Обмена Информацией, 7 бит, romanized: Kod Obmena Informatsiey, 7 bit, КОИ-7) is a 7-bit character encoding, designed to cover Russian, which uses the Cyrillic alphabet.

It was first standardized in GOST 13052-67 (with the 2nd revision GOST 13052-74 / ST SEV 356-76) and GOST 27463-87 / ST SEV 356-86.

Shift Out (SO) and Shift In (SI) control characters are used in KOI-7, where SO starts printing Russian letters (KOI-7 N1), and SI starts printing Latin letters again (KOI-7 N0), or for lowercase and uppercase switching. This version is also known as KOI7-switched aka csKOI7switched.

On ISO 2022 compatible computer terminals KOI7-switched can be activated by the escape sequence ESC ( @ ESC ) N LS0.

KOI-7 was used on machines like the SM EVM (СМ ЭВМ) and DVK (ДВК); KOI-7 N2 was utilized in the machine-language of the Elektronika D3-28 as four-digit hexadecimal code, BESM-6, where it was called ВКД, (internal data code). The encodings were also used on RSX-11, RT-11 and similar systems.

== KOI-7 N0 ==
KOI-7 N0 (КОИ-7 Н0) is identical to the IRV set in ISO 646:1967. Compared to US-ASCII, the dollar sign ("$") at code point 24 (_{hex}) was replaced by the universal currency sign "¤", but this was not maintained in all cases, in particular not after the fall of the Iron Curtain. Likewise, the IRV set in ISO/IEC 646:1991 also changed the character back to a dollar sign.

KOI-7 N0
	0	1	2	3	4	5	6	7	8	9	A	B	C	D	E	F
0x	NUL	SOH	STX	ETX	EOT	ENQ	ACK	BEL	BS	HT	LF	VT	FF	CR	SO	SI
1x	DLE	DC1	DC2	DC3	DC4	NAK	SYN	ETB	CAN	EM	SUB	ESC	FS	GS	RS	US
2x	SP	!	"	#	¤/$	%	&	'	(	)	*	+	,	-	.	/
3x	0	1	2	3	4	5	6	7	8	9	:	;	<	=	>	?
4x	@	A	B	C	D	E	F	G	H	I	J	K	L	M	N	O
5x	P	Q	R	S	T	U	V	W	X	Y	Z	[	\	]		_
6x	`	a	b	c	d	e	f	g	h	i	j	k	l	m	n	o
7x	p	q	r	s	t	u	v	w	x	y	z	{	|	}	~	DEL

== KOI-7 N1 ==
KOI-7 N1 (КОИ-7 Н1) was first standardized in GOST 13052-67, and later also in ISO 5427. It is sometimes referred to as "koi-0" as well.

Compared to ASCII and ISO 646 uppercase and lowercase letters are swapped in order to make it easier to recognize Russian text when presented using ASCII.

To trim the alphabet into chunks of 32 characters the dotted Ё/ë was dropped. In order to avoid conflicts with ASCII's and ISO 646's definition as DEL and its usage as EOF marker (-1) in some systems, it dropped the "CAPITAL HARD SIGN" Ъ that would have naturally resided at this location.

In a Bulgarian variant the unnecessary Russian "CAPITAL YERY" Ы at code point 121 was replaced by the "CAPITAL HARD SIGN" Ъ.

KOI-7 N1
	0	1	2	3	4	5	6	7	8	9	A	B	C	D	E	F
0x	NUL	SOH	STX	ETX	EOT	ENQ	ACK	BEL	BS	HT	LF	VT	FF	CR	SO	SI
1x	DLE	DC1	DC2	DC3	DC4	NAK	SYN	ETB	CAN	EM	SUB	ESC	FS	GS	RS	US
2x	SP	!	"	#	¤/$	%	&	'	(	)	*	+	,	-	.	/
3x	0	1	2	3	4	5	6	7	8	9	:	;	<	=	>	?
4x	ю 044E	а 0430	б 0431	ц 0446	д 0434	е 0435	ф 0444	г 0433	х 0445	и 0438	й 0439	к 043A	л 043B	м 043C	н 043D	о 043E
5x	п 043F	я 044F	р 0440	с 0441	т 0442	у 0443	ж 0436	в 0432	ь 044C	ы 044B	з 0437	ш 0448	э 044D	щ 0449	ч 0447	ъ 044A
6x	Ю 042E	А 0410	Б 0411	Ц 0426	Д 0414	Е 0415	Ф 0424	Г 0413	Х 0425	И 0418	Й 0419	К 041A	Л 041B	М 041C	Н 041D	О 041E
7x	П 041F	Я 042F	Р 0420	С 0421	Т 0422	У 0423	Ж 0416	В 0412	Ь 042C	Ы/Ъ	З 0417	Ш 0428	Э 042D	Щ 0429	Ч 0427	DEL

== KOI-7 N2 ==
KOI-7 N2 (КОИ-7 Н2), like KOI-7 N1, was also standardized in GOST 13052-67.

Kermit names it SHORT-KOI / short-koi.

KOI-7 N2
	0	1	2	3	4	5	6	7	8	9	A	B	C	D	E	F
0x	NUL	SOH	STX	ETX	EOT	ENQ	ACK	BEL	BS	HT	LF	VT	FF	CR	SO	SI
1x	DLE	DC1	DC2	DC3	DC4	NAK	SYN	ETB	CAN	EM	SUB	ESC	FS	GS	RS	US
2x	SP	!	"	#	¤/$	%	&	'	(	)	*	+	,	-	.	/
3x	0	1	2	3	4	5	6	7	8	9	:	;	<	=	>	?
4x	@	A	B	C	D	E	F	G	H	I	J	K	L	M	N	O
5x	P	Q	R	S	T	U	V	W	X	Y	Z	[	\	]	↑/	_
6x	Ю 042E	А 0410	Б 0411	Ц 0426	Д 0414	Е 0415	Ф 0424	Г 0413	Х 0425	И 0418	Й 0419	К 041A	Л 041B	М 041C	Н 041D	О 041E
7x	П 041F	Я 042F	Р 0420	С 0421	Т 0422	У 0423	Ж 0416	В 0412	Ь 042C	Ы 042B	З 0417	Ш 0428	Э 042D	Щ 0429	Ч 0427	DEL

== See also ==
- KOI character encodings
  - KOI-8
  - KOI8-R
  - KOI8-U
- YUSCII (SLOSCII, CROSCII, SRPSCII, MAKSCII)
- CP 866
- Windows-1251
