= Ka with grave =

Cyrillic letter

- К̀ к̀

Usage
- Writing system: Cyrillic
- Type: Alphabetic
- Language of origin: Chuvash language
- Sound values: [kʲ], [c]

History
Development
D46
    - 𐤊
      - Κ κ
        - К к
          - К̀ к̀
- Sisters: K̀ k̀

Ka with grave (К̀ к̀) is an additional letter of the Cyrillic script which was used in Chuvash in the 19th century. It is composed of the letter ka ⟨К⟩ with a grave accent.

== Usage ==
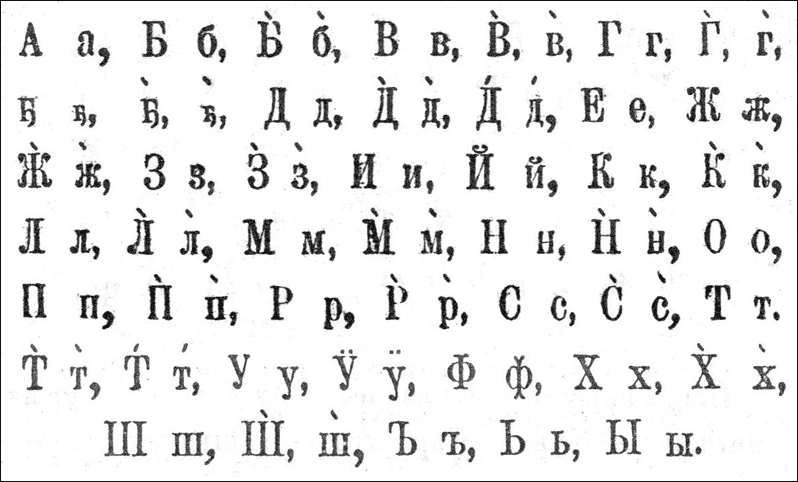
The initial alphabet of Ivan Yakovlev, with ka with grave.

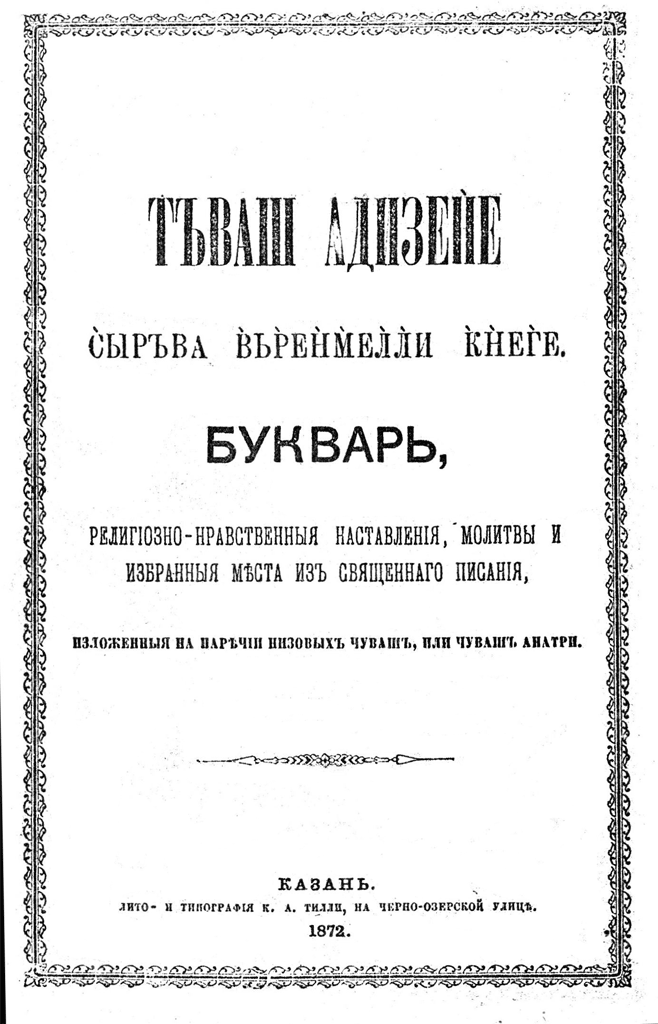
The cover of a Chuvash syllabary of 1872, with ka with grave.

Ka with grave was used in Ivan Yakovlev's initial alphabet of 47 letters, representing the palatalized voiceless velar plosive [kʲ] or the voiceless palatal plosive [c].

== Computing codes ==
Ka with grave can be represented with the following Unicode characters:

Character information
Preview	К		к		̀	
Unicode name	CYRILLIC CAPITAL LETTER KA		CYRILLIC SMALL LETTER KA		COMBINING GRAVE ACCENT	
Encodings	decimal	hex	dec	hex	dec	hex
Unicode	1050	U+041A	1082	U+043A	768	U+0300
UTF-8	208 154	D0 9A	208 186	D0 BA	204 128	CC 80
Numeric character reference	&#1050;	&#x41A;	&#1082;	&#x43A;	&#768;	&#x300;
Named character reference	&Kcy;		&kcy;			
KOI8-R and KOI8-U	235	EB	203	CB		
Code page 855	199	C7	198	C6		
Code page 866	138	8A	170	AA		
Windows-1251	202	CA	234	EA		
ISO-8859-5	186	BA	218	DA		
Macintosh Cyrillic	138	8A	234	EA		

== Bibliography ==
- Т́ъваш ад́изен̀е с̀ыръва в̀ьр̀ен̀м̀ел̀л̀и к̀н̀ег̀е (in Chuvash). Казань: Лито- и типография К. А. Тилли. 1872.
