= Lectionary 5 =

Lectionary ℓ 5
- New Testament manuscript
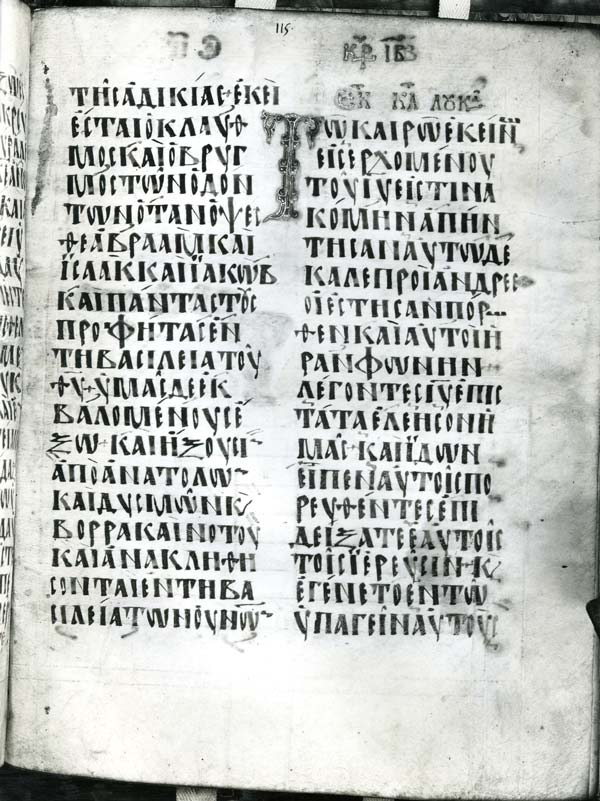
- Folio 115 recto
- Name: Barocci 202
- Text: Evangelistarion †
- Date: 10th-century
- Script: Greek
- Now at: Bodleian Library
- Size: 31 cm by 23 cm

Lectionary 5, designated by siglum ℓ 5 (in the Gregory-Aland numbering). It is a Greek manuscript of the New Testament, on vellum leaves. Palaeographically it has been assigned to the 10th-century.

== Description ==
The codex contains lessons from the Gospels of John, Matthew, and Luke lectionary (Evangelistarium) with lacunae at the beginning and end. The text is written in Greek uncial letters, on 150 parchment leaves (31 cm by 23 cm), with 2 columns per page, 19 lines per page and 7-12 letters per line. It has musical notes.

Matthew 19:16

διδασκαλε (teacher) — א, B, D, L, f^{1}, 892^{txt}, 1010, 1365, ℓ 5, it^{a, d, e, ff1}, cop^{bo}, eth, geo, Origen, Hilary;
διδασκαλε αγαθε (good teacher) — C, K, W, Δ, Θ, f^{13}, 28, 33, 565, 700, 892^{mg}, 1009, 1071, 1079, 1195, 1216, 1230, 1241, 1242, 1253, 1344, 1546, 1646, 2148, 2174, Byz, Lect, it, vg, syr, cop^{sa}, arm, eth, Diatessaron.

== History ==
The manuscript once belonged to Colbert. It was examined by John Mill and Wettstein.

It was added to the list of the New Testament manuscripts by Wettstein.

The manuscript is sporadically cited in the critical editions of the Greek New Testament of UBS (UBS3).

The codex now is located in the Bodleian Library (Barocci 202) at Oxford.

== See also ==
- List of New Testament lectionaries
- Biblical manuscript
- Textual criticism

== Bibliography ==
- W. H. P. Hatch, The Principal Uncial Manuscripts of the New Testament, LXXII (Chicago, 1939).
