= Kje =

Cyrillic letter

Kje (Tje)
- Ќ ќ

Usage
- Writing system: Cyrillic
- Type: Alphabetic
- Language of origin: Macedonian
- Sound values: [c], [tɕ]

History
- Transliterations: Q q

Kje (Ќ ќ or Ḱ ḱ; italics: Ќ ќ or Ḱ ḱ) is a letter of the Cyrillic script, used only in the Macedonian alphabet, where it represents the voiceless palatal plosive /c/, or the voiceless alveolo-palatal affricate /tɕ/. Kje is the 24th letter in this alphabet. It is romanised as ⟨ḱ⟩ or sometimes ⟨ķ⟩ or ⟨kj⟩.

Words with this sound are most often cognates to those in Serbo-Croatian with ⟨ћ⟩/⟨ć⟩ and in Bulgarian with ⟨щ⟩, ⟨т⟩ or ⟨к⟩. For example, Macedonian ноќ (noḱ, night) corresponds to Serbo-Croatian ноћ/noć, and Bulgarian нощ (nosht). The common surname ending -ić is spelled -иќ in Macedonian.

== Related letters and other similar characters ==
- Ḱ ḱ : Latin letter K with acute
- Ķ ķ : Latin letter K with cedilla
- К к : Cyrillic letter Ka
- К̀ к̀ : Cyrillic letter Ka with grave
- Ћ ћ: Cyrillic letter Tshe
- Ѓ ѓ : Cyrillic letter Gje
- Ť ť : Latin letter T with caron

== Computing codes ==
Character information
Preview	Ќ		ќ	
Unicode name	CYRILLIC CAPITAL LETTER KJE		CYRILLIC SMALL LETTER KJE	
Encodings	decimal	hex	dec	hex
Unicode	1036	U+040C	1116	U+045C
UTF-8	208 140	D0 8C	209 156	D1 9C
Numeric character reference	&#1036;	&#x40C;	&#1116;	&#x45C;
Named character reference	&KJcy;		&kjcy;	
Code page 855	151	97	150	96
Windows-1251	141	8D	157	9D
ISO-8859-5	172	AC	252	FC
Macintosh Cyrillic	205	CD	206	CE

== See also ==
- Iotation
