= Gje =

Cyrillic letter

Gje (Dshe)
- Ѓ ѓ

Usage
- Writing system: Cyrillic
- Type: Alphabetic
- Language of origin: Macedonian language
- Sound values: [ɟ], [dʑ]

History
- Transliterations: ǵ, Gj gj

Gje (or Dshe) (Ѓ ѓ; italics: Ѓ ѓ) is a letter of the Cyrillic script.

Ѓ is used in Macedonian to represent the voiced palatal plosive /ɟ/.

Ѓ is most commonly romanised using the Latin letter G with acute ⟨ǵ⟩. When the Socialist Republic of Macedonia was part of SFR Yugoslavia, the Macedonian ѓ (ǵ) was also transliterated as đ, ģ, gj, or dj.

Words with this letter are often cognate with Жд жд (Zhd zhd) in Bulgarian and Ђ ђ / Đ đ in Serbo-Croatian. For example, the Macedonian word for birth (раѓање is raǵanje, which in Bulgarian is раждане - razhdane, and in Serbian рађање - rađanje).

== Related letters and other similar characters ==
- Ģ ģ: Latin letter G with cedilla - a Latvian letter
- Г г: Cyrillic letter Ge
- Ђ ђ: Cyrillic letter Dje
- Ќ ќ: Cyrillic letter Kje
- Ď ď: Latin letter D with caron

== Computing codes ==
Character information
Preview	Ѓ		ѓ	
Unicode name	CYRILLIC CAPITAL LETTER GJE		CYRILLIC SMALL LETTER GJE	
Encodings	decimal	hex	dec	hex
Unicode	1027	U+0403	1107	U+0453
UTF-8	208 131	D0 83	209 147	D1 93
Numeric character reference	&#1027;	&#x403;	&#1107;	&#x453;
Named character reference	&GJcy;		&gjcy;	
Code page 855	131	83	130	82
Windows-1251	129	81	131	83
ISO-8859-5	163	A3	243	F3
Macintosh Cyrillic	174	AE	175	AF
