= Dzhe =

Letter of the Cyrillic script

- Џ џ

Usage
- Writing system: Cyrillic
- Type: Alphabetic
- Sound values: [dʒ], [ɖʐ]

History
- Development: Ⱌ: Ц ц; Џ џ

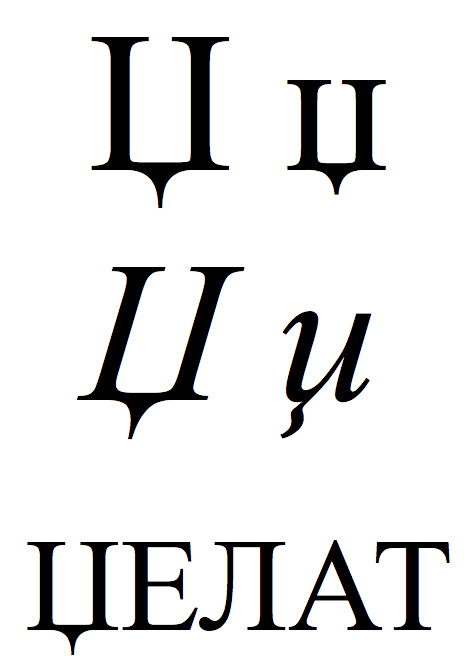
Various forms of the letter dzhe, including the word dzhelat (executioner).

Dzhe (Џ џ; italics: Џ џ or Џ џ; italics: Џ џ), also spelled dže, is a letter of the Cyrillic script used in Macedonian and varieties of Serbo-Croatian (Montenegrin and Serbian) to represent the voiced postalveolar affricate /d͡ʒ/, like the pronunciation of j in “jump”.

Dzhe corresponds in other Cyrillic alphabets to the digraphs дж or чж, or to the letters Che with descender (Ҷ ҷ), Che with vertical stroke (Ҹ ҹ), Khakassian Che (Ӌ ӌ), Zhe with breve (Ӂ ӂ), Zhe with diaeresis (Ӝ ӝ), or Zhje (Җ җ).

In the Latin version of Serbo-Croatian, it corresponds with the digraph ⟨dž⟩ which, like the digraphs ⟨lj⟩ and ⟨nj⟩, is treated as a single letter, including in crossword puzzles and for purposes of collation.

Abkhaz uses it to represent the voiced retroflex affricate /ɖʐ/. The digraph џь is used to represent the /dʒ/ sound.

== History ==
The letter Dzhe was first used in the 15th-century Romanian Cyrillic alphabet, as a modified form of the letter ч. Serbian scribes began using it in the 17th century. Vuk Karadžić included it in his Cyrillic script reform, when the letter entered widespread use.

== Related letters and other similar characters ==
- Dž : Digraph Dž
- J j : Latin letter J
- G g : Latin letter soft G, the romanization and Latin equivalent of ⟨џ⟩ in the Romanian Cyrillic alphabet
- Ӂ ӂ : Cyrillic letter Ӂ
- Ӝ ӝ : Cyrillic letter Ӝ
- Җ җ : Cyrillic letter Җ
- Ц ц : Cyrillic letter Ц
- Ч ч : Cyrillic letter Ч
- Ҷ ҷ : Cyrillic letter Ҷ
- Ӌ ӌ : Cyrillic letter Ӌ
- Ҹ ҹ : Cyrillic letter Ҹ

Character information
Preview	Џ		џ	
Unicode name	CYRILLIC CAPITAL LETTER DZHE		CYRILLIC SMALL LETTER DZHE	
Encodings	decimal	hex	dec	hex
Unicode	1039	U+040F	1119	U+045F
UTF-8	208 143	D0 8F	209 159	D1 9F
Numeric character reference	&#1039;	&#x40F;	&#1119;	&#x45F;
Named character reference	&DZcy;		&dzcy;	
Code page 855	155	9B	154	9A
Windows-1251	143	8F	159	9F
ISO-8859-5	175	AF	255	FF
Macintosh Cyrillic	218	DA	219	DB
