= Kha (Cyrillic) =

Letter in the Cyrillic script

Kha (хѣръ)
- Х х

Usage
- Writing system: Cyrillic
- Type: Alphabetic
- Language of origin: Old Church Slavonic
- Sound values: [x], [χ], [h]
- In Unicode: U+0425, U+0445

History
- Development: Χ χ: Х х
- Transliterations: Kh kh, X x, H h

Other
- Associated numbers: 600 (Cyrillic numerals)

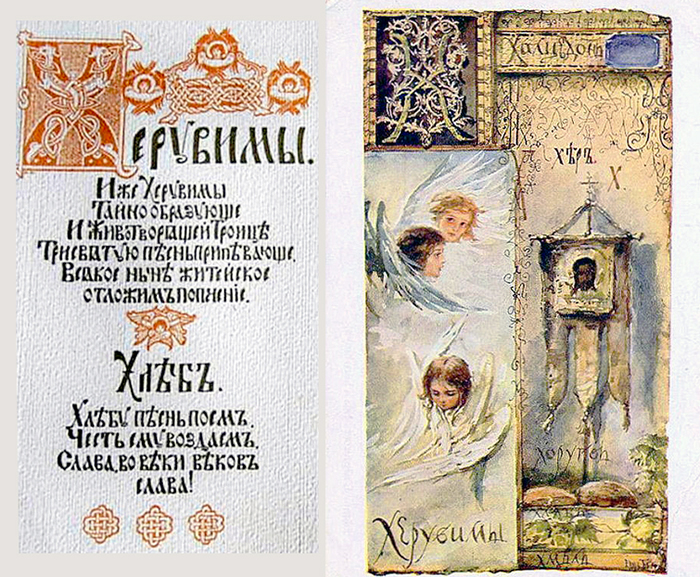
Kha, from Elisabeth Boehm's alphabet book

Kha, Khe, Xe, He or Ha (Х х; italics: Х х or Х х; italics: Х х) is a letter of the Cyrillic script. It looks the same as the Latin letter X (X x X x), in both uppercase and lowercase, both roman and italic forms, and was derived from the Greek letter Chi, which also bears a resemblance to both the Latin X and Kha itself.

It commonly represents the voiceless velar fricative /x/, similar to how some Scottish speakers pronounce the hard ⟨ch⟩ in “loch”, but has different pronunciations in different languages.

Kha is romanised as ⟨kh⟩ for Russian, Ukrainian, Mongolian, and Tajik, and as ⟨ch⟩ for Belarusian and Polish, while being romanised as ⟨h⟩ for Serbo-Croatian, Bulgarian, Macedonian, and Kazakh. It is also romanised as ⟨j⟩ for Spanish.

== History ==
The Cyrillic letter Kha was derived from the Greek letter Chi (Χ χ).

The name of Kha in the Early Cyrillic alphabet was хѣръ (xěrŭ).

In the Cyrillic numeral system, Kha has a value of 600.

== Usage ==
=== Russian ===
Kha is the twenty-third letter of the Russian alphabet. It represents the voiceless velar fricative /x/ unless it is before a palatalizing vowel, when it represents /xʲ/.

=== Ossetian ===
Kha represents the voiceless uvular fricative /χ/ in Ossetian. The digraph ⟨хъ⟩ represents the voiceless uvular plosive /q/.

=== Belarusian ===
Kha is also an alternative transliteration of the letter خ Ḫāʼ in the Arabic alphabet. This was used in Belarusian Arabic script, corresponding to the above Cyrillic letter.

=== Ukrainian ===
Kha is the twenty-sixth letter of the Ukrainian alphabet. It represents the voiceless velar fricative /x/.

=== Aleut ===
In Aleut, kha represents /x/.

== Figurative meanings of "хѣръ" ==
- Because of the shape of the letter X, its name kher was often used to refer to something cross-shaped: Dahl mentions "the game of kheriki-oniki" (noughts and crosses) and the expression "legs like kher" to refer to the genu valgum deformity (knock knee). From this also comes the word pokherovat (originally, to cross out crosswise; cf. in N. S. Leskov: Vladika crossed out the consistory's decision on the appointment of the investigation with a kher.
- Being the first letter of the vulgar and obscene word for the male genital organ, the word kher has been actively used as its euphemism since the 19th century. As a result, by the 1990s in the USSR, the word "kher" and its derivatives (e.g., "pokherit") were perceived as taboo by many people, as the original names of Cyrillic letters had been forgotten by the majority of the population. This fact has also affected the use of the word "kher" in the post-Soviet era, despite the change of attitude towards obscene vocabulary. Nevertheless, the portal Gramota.ru notes that "the word kher and all derivatives of it do not belong to obscene words".

== Related letters and other similar characters ==
- Χ χ : Greek letter Chi
- H h : Latin letter H
- J j : Latin letter J
- X x : Latin letter X
- ﺥ : Arabic or Persian letter Ḫāʾ
- Һ һ : Cyrillic letter Ha
- Ѯ ѯ : Cyrillic letter Ksi
- ख़ : Devanagari letter Ḵẖa
- ਖ਼ : Gurumukhi letter Ḵẖa

== Computing codes ==
Character information
Preview	Х		х	
Unicode name	CYRILLIC CAPITAL LETTER HA		CYRILLIC SMALL LETTER HA	
Encodings	decimal	hex	dec	hex
Unicode	1061	U+0425	1093	U+0445
UTF-8	208 165	D0 A5	209 133	D1 85
Numeric character reference	&#1061;	&#x425;	&#1093;	&#x445;
Named character reference	&KHcy;		&khcy;	
KOI8-R and KOI8-U	232	E8	200	C8
Code page 855	182	B6	181	B5
Code page 866	149	95	229	E5
Windows-1251	213	D5	245	F5
ISO-8859-5	197	C5	229	E5
Macintosh Cyrillic	149	95	245	F5
