= I (Cyrillic) =

Letter of the Cyrillic script

I (ижє)
- И и

Usage
- Writing system: Cyrillic
- Type: Alphabetic
- Language of origin: Old Church Slavonic
- Sound values: [i], [ɪ], [ɤ], [ɨ]
- In Unicode: U+0418, U+0438

History
Development
N24
    - 𐤇
      - Η η
        - И и
- Transliterations: I i

Other
- Associated numbers: 8 (Cyrillic numerals)

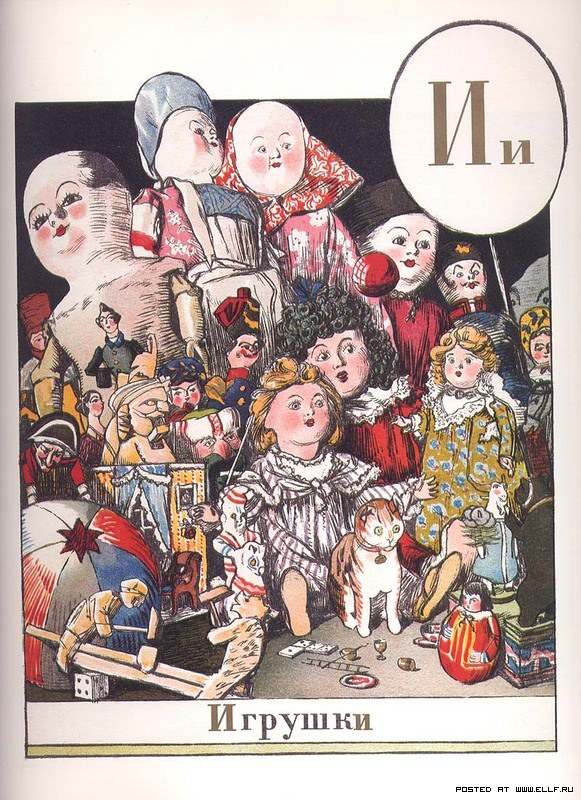
И, from Alexandre Benois' 1904 азбука.

I (И и; italics: И и or И и; italics: И и) is a letter used in almost all modern Cyrillic alphabets with the exception of Belarusian, where it is replaced by І.

It commonly represents either the close front unrounded vowel /i/ (e.g., in Russian and Bulgarian), like the pronunciation of ⟨i⟩ in "machine", or the near-close near-front unrounded vowel /ɪ/, (e.g., in Ukrainian), like the pronunciation of ⟨i⟩ in "bin".

== History ==
Because the Cyrillic letter И was derived from the Greek letter Eta (Η η), the Cyrillic ⟨И⟩ had the shape of ⟨Η⟩ up to the 13th century.

The name of the Cyrillic letter И in the Early Cyrillic alphabet was ижє (iže), meaning "which".

In the Cyrillic numeral system, the Cyrillic letter И had a value of 8, corresponding to the Greek letter Eta (Η η).

In the Early Cyrillic alphabet, like in the Greek alphabet of the time (see Iotacism), there was little or no distinction between the letter ⟨И⟩/⟨H⟩ and the letter ⟨І⟩, the latter of which was derived from the Greek letter Iota (Ι ι). Both remained in the alphabetical repertoire while they represented different numbers in the Cyrillic numeral system: eight and ten.

In New Church Slavonic, they co-exist with each other with no pronunciation differences. But in Ukrainian and Rusyn, the two letters have different pronunciations. Other modern orthographies for Slavic languages eliminated one of the two letters in alphabet reforms of the 19th or the 20th centuries. The Russian, Macedonian, Serbian, and Bulgarian languages now use only ⟨И⟩, and Belarusian uses only ⟨І⟩. However, the letter ⟨І⟩ was also used in Russian before the reform of 1917–1918.

== Form ==
Originally, Cyrillic ⟨И⟩ had the shape identical to the capital Greek letter Eta ⟨Η⟩. The middle stroke was later turned counterclockwise, which resulted in the modern form resembling a mirrored capital Latin letter N ⟨N⟩ and so ⟨И⟩ is used in faux Cyrillic typography. However, the style of the two letters is not fully identical: in roman fonts, ⟨И⟩ has heavier vertical strokes and serifs on all four corners, and ⟨N⟩ has a heavier diagonal stroke and lacks a serif on the bottom-right corner.

In roman and oblique fonts, the lowercase letter ⟨и⟩ has the same shape as the uppercase letter ⟨И⟩. In italic fonts, the lowercase letter ⟨и⟩ looks like the italic form of the lowercase Latin U ⟨u⟩. Both uppercase and lowercase handwritten forms of the Cyrillic letter I look like handwritten forms of the Latin letter U.

== Usage ==
Since 1918, ⟨и⟩ has been the tenth letter of the Russian alphabet, and in Russian, it represents /i/, like the i in machine, except after some consonants (see below). In Russian, the letter typically denotes a preceding soft consonant and so is considered the soft counterpart to ⟨ы⟩, which represents [ɨ]. However, unlike other "soft" vowels (е, ё, ю and я), и in isolation is not preceded by the /j/ semivowel. In Russian, the letter could be combined in the digraph ⟨ио⟩ (like ⟨ьо⟩, ⟨їô⟩ and ⟨iо⟩) to represent ё before it started around the 1950s, although that letter remains rare as people usually use е (apparent confusion has remained in the transcription of some foreign words).

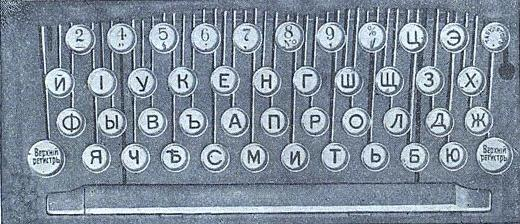
In early Russian typewriters like this one, there was no key for the digit 1, so the capital І was used instead. Following the Russian alphabet reform of 1918, a 1 key was added.

⟨И⟩ was used significantly less in Russian before the Bolshevik reform of 1918:

- ⟨і⟩ was used before all vowels and before the semivowel ⟨й⟩ except at the end of a morpheme in a compound word, where ⟨и⟩ was used. So англійскій (English) used ⟨і⟩, but пяти + акровый = пятиакровый (five-acre) used ⟨и⟩.
- ⟨и⟩ was used as the last letter of a word and before consonants except in міръ for "world, universe, local community, commons, society, laity" (and words derived from it) to differentiate from миръ "peace"). After 1918, both are spelled мир.

According to critics of the Bolshevik reform, the choice of Ии as the only letter to represent that side and the removal of Іі defeated the purpose of 'simplifying’ the language, as Ии occupies more space and, furthermore, is sometimes indistinguishable from Шш.

⟨И⟩ is pronounced [ɨ] in ⟨жи⟩ (sounds like ⟨жы⟩ [ʐɨ]), ⟨ши⟩ (sounds like ⟨шы⟩ [ʂɨ]) and ⟨ци⟩ (sounds like ⟨цы⟩ [t͡sɨ]), because in Russian, the sound [i] usually cannot be pronounced after "zh" ⟨ж⟩, "sh" ⟨ш⟩, and "ts" ⟨ц⟩.

In the Bulgarian Cyrillic alphabet ⟨и⟩ is the ninth letter. It represents the sound /i/ and also occurs with a grave accent, ѝ, to distinguish orthographically the conjunction ⟨и⟩ ("and") and the short form of the indirect object ⟨ѝ⟩ ("her").

In Kazakh, ⟨И⟩ is used for /əj/ and /ɪj/ in native words and for /i/ in loanwords, and ⟨І⟩ is used for /ɪ/ in native words.

In Belarusian, the letter (и) is not used at all, and the sound /i/ is represented by the letter ⟨і⟩, which is also known as Belarusian-Ukrainian I.

The letter ⟨И⟩ is the eleventh letter of the Ukrainian alphabet and represents the sound [ɪ], a separate phoneme in Ukrainian. The Ukrainian ⟨и⟩ can be transliterated to other languages that use the Cyrillic script by either ⟨и⟩ and ⟨ы⟩ because of the lack of a uniform transliteration rule. Speakers of other Slavic languages can perceive Ukrainian [ɪ] as [i], [ɨ], or sometimes even [e] (see Ukrainian phonology for more on the pronunciation of [ɪ]). The sound [i] in Ukrainian is represented by the letter ⟨і⟩, just as in Belarusian.

In the Serbian Cyrillic alphabet, ⟨и⟩ is the tenth letter of the alphabet. In Serbian, the letter represents /i/, like the i in machine. In the Serbian Latin alphabet, the sound is represented by "I/i".

In Macedonian, ⟨и⟩ is the eleventh letter of the alphabet and represents the sound /i/.

It is transliterated from Russian as ⟨i⟩ or from Ukrainian as ⟨y⟩ or ⟨i⟩, depending on the romanization system. (See romanization of Russian and romanization of Ukrainian for more details.)

In Tuvan, the letter can be written as a double vowel.

=== Stylistic uses ===
The logo of Nine Inch Nails

Due to its close resemblance to the Latin capital letter N, specifically as a "flipped" or "reflected" version of it, it is sometimes used stylistically as a replacement for N. This is commonly seen in Faux Cyrillic.

The industrial rock band Nine Inch Nails notably use both N and И in its logo. The hard rock band Linkin Park have also used the glyph, particularly on the cover of their debut album Hybrid Theory.

American rapper Nathan Feuerstein is mainly known by his initials as "NF", which is stylized as "ИF".

=== Accented forms and derived letters ===
The vowel that is represented by ⟨и⟩ can, as is the case for almost any other Slavonic vowel, be stressed or unstressed. The stressed variant is sometimes (in special texts like dictionaries or to prevent ambiguity) graphically marked by the acute, grave, the double grave, or the circumflex accent.

Special Serbian texts also use ⟨и⟩ with a macron to represent the long unstressed variant of the sound. Serbian ⟨и⟩ with a circumflex can be unstressed as well, which then represents the plural form of the genitive case to distinguish from other similar forms.

Modern Church Slavonic orthography uses the smooth breathing sign (Greek and Church Slavonic: psili, Latin: spiritus lenis) above the initial vowels (for tradition alone since there is no difference in pronunciation). It can be combined with acute or grave accents if necessary.

None of those combinations is considered to be a separate letter of respective alphabet, but one of them (⟨Ѝ⟩) has an individual code position in Unicode.

⟨И⟩ with a breve forms the letter ⟨й⟩ for the consonant /j/ or a similar semivowel, like the y in English "yes." The form has been used regularly in Church Slavonic since the 16th century, but it officially became a separate letter of alphabet only much later (in Russian in 1918). The original name of ⟨й⟩ was I s kratkoy ('I with the short [line]'), later I kratkoye ('short I') in Russian. It is known similarly as I kratko in Bulgarian but as Yot in Ukrainian.

Cyrillic alphabets of non-Slavic languages have additional ⟨и⟩-based letters like ⟨И̃⟩ or ⟨Ҋ⟩.

== Related letters and similar characters ==
- Η η : Greek letter Eta
- H h : Latin letter H
- Ι ι : Greek letter Iota
- I i : Latin letter I
- Í í : Latin letter Í
- Й й : Cyrillic letter short I
- І і : Cyrillic letter dotted I
- ͷ : Pamphylian Greek letter digamma

== Computing codes ==
Character information
Preview	И		и	
Unicode name	CYRILLIC CAPITAL LETTER I		CYRILLIC SMALL LETTER I	
Encodings	decimal	hex	dec	hex
Unicode	1048	U+0418	1080	U+0438
UTF-8	208 152	D0 98	208 184	D0 B8
Numeric character reference	&#1048;	&#x418;	&#1080;	&#x438;
Named character reference	&Icy;		&icy;	
KOI8-R and KOI8-U	233	E9	201	C9
Code page 855	184	B8	183	B7
Code page 866	136	88	168	A8
Windows-1251	200	C8	232	E8
ISO-8859-5	184	B8	216	D8
Macintosh Cyrillic	136	88	232	E8
