= Russian Braille =

Braille equivalent of the Cyrillic script

- Script type: Alphabet
- Print basis: Russian
- Languages: Russian

Related scripts
- Parent systems: Braille: Russian Braille

Russian Braille is the braille alphabet of the Russian language. With suitable extensions, it is used for languages of neighboring countries that are written in Cyrillic in print, such as Ukrainian and Mongolian. It is based on the Latin transliteration of Cyrillic, with additional letters assigned idiosyncratically. In Russian, it is known as the Braille Script. (Note: Шрифт Брайля, Shrift Braylya)

== Alphabet ==
The Russian Braille alphabet is as follows:

| ⠁ (braille pattern dots-1) | ⠃ (braille pattern dots-12) | ⠺ (braille pattern dots-2456) | ⠛ (braille pattern dots-1245) | ⠙ (braille pattern dots-145) | ⠑ (braille pattern dots-15) | ⠡ (braille pattern dots-16) | ⠚ (braille pattern dots-245) | ⠵ (braille pattern dots-1356) | ⠊ (braille pattern dots-24) | ⠯ (braille pattern dots-12346) |
| а a | б b | в v | г g | д d | е e, ye | ё yo | ж zh | з z | и i | й y |
| ⠅ (braille pattern dots-13) | ⠇ (braille pattern dots-123) | ⠍ (braille pattern dots-134) | ⠝ (braille pattern dots-1345) | ⠕ (braille pattern dots-135) | ⠏ (braille pattern dots-1234) | ⠗ (braille pattern dots-1235) | ⠎ (braille pattern dots-234) | ⠞ (braille pattern dots-2345) | ⠥ (braille pattern dots-136) | ⠋ (braille pattern dots-124) |
| к k | л l | м m | н n | о o | п p | р r | с s | т t | у u | ф f |
| ⠓ (braille pattern dots-125) | ⠉ (braille pattern dots-14) | ⠟ (braille pattern dots-12345) | ⠱ (braille pattern dots-156) | ⠭ (braille pattern dots-1346) | ⠷ (braille pattern dots-12356) | ⠮ (braille pattern dots-2346) | ⠾ (braille pattern dots-23456) | ⠪ (braille pattern dots-246) | ⠳ (braille pattern dots-1256) | ⠫ (braille pattern dots-1246) |
| х kh | ц ts | ч ch | ш sh | щ shch | ъ ” | ы y | ь ’ | э e | ю yu | я ya |

The adaptation of ⠟ q to ч [tɕ] and ⠭ x to щ [ɕː] is reminiscent of the adaptation in Chinese pinyin of q to [tɕ] and x to [ɕ].

Contractions are not used.

=== Obsolete letters ===
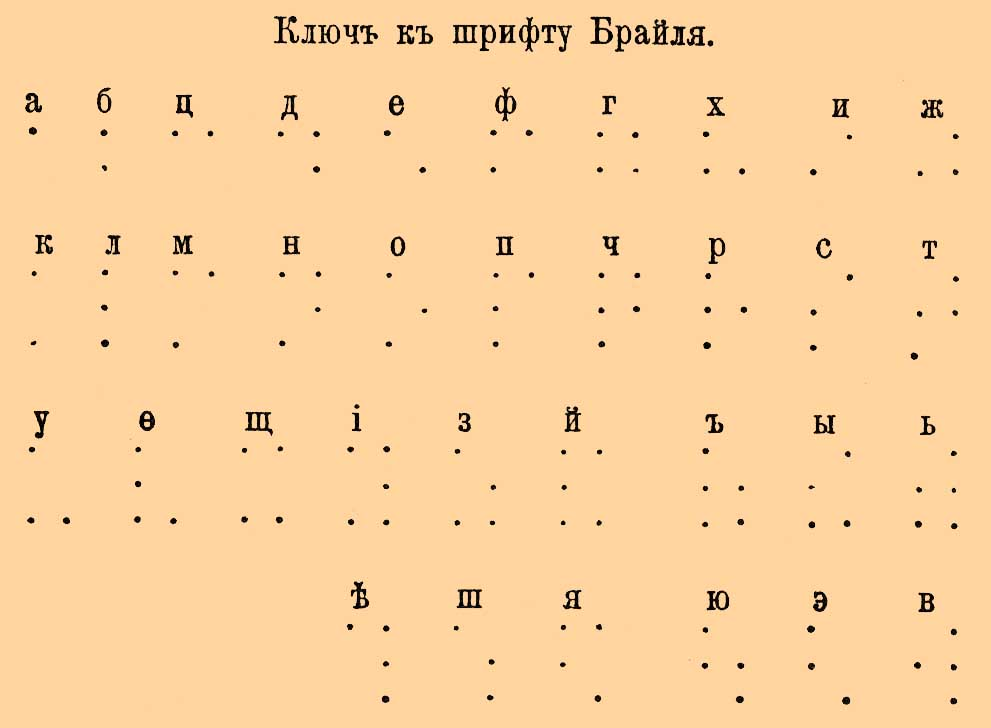
The Russian braille alphabet, ca 1900

The pre-Revolutionary alphabet, reproduced at right from an old encyclopedia, includes several letters which have since been dropped. In addition, the letter э is shown with a slightly different form.

| Print | ѳ th | і i | ѣ ě | э è |
|---|---|---|---|---|
| Braille | ⠧ (braille pattern dots-1236) | ⠽ (braille pattern dots-13456) | ⠹ (braille pattern dots-1456) | ⠣ (braille pattern dots-126) |

Although obsolete in Russian Braille, these letters continue in several derivative alphabets.

== Punctuation ==
Single punctuation:

| Print | , | . | ? | ! | ; | : | - | — |
|---|---|---|---|---|---|---|---|---|
| Braille | ⠂ (braille pattern dots-2) | ⠲ (braille pattern dots-256) | ⠢ (braille pattern dots-26) | ⠖ (braille pattern dots-235) | ⠆ (braille pattern dots-23) | ⠒ (braille pattern dots-25) | ⠤ (braille pattern dots-36) | ⠤ (braille pattern dots-36) |

Paired punctuation:

| Print | « ... » (outer quote) | „ ... “ (inner quote) | ( ... ) | [ ... ] |
| Braille | ... | ... | ... | ... |

== Formatting ==
| italics | capital | number | column |
|---|---|---|---|
| ⠸ (braille pattern dots-456) | ⠨ (braille pattern dots-46) | ⠼ (braille pattern dots-3456) | ⠿ (braille pattern dots-123456) |

Columns marked with ⠿ are shown in the braille-chart image in the box, above right.

== Numbers and arithmetic ==
Numbers are the letters a–j introduced with ⠼, as in other alphabets. Arithmetical symbols are as follows. The lowered g used for parentheses in prose becomes an equal sign in arithmetic, where a symmetrical pair of parentheses is used instead:

| Print | + | − | × | · | : | = |
|---|---|---|---|---|---|---|
| Braille | ⠖ (braille pattern dots-235) | ⠤ (braille pattern dots-36) | ⠦ (braille pattern dots-236) | ⠄ (braille pattern dots-3) | ⠲ (braille pattern dots-256) | ⠶ (braille pattern dots-2356) |

| Print | < | > | ( | ) | √ | % |
|---|---|---|---|---|---|---|
| Braille | ⠪ (braille pattern dots-246) | ⠕ (braille pattern dots-135) | ⠣ (braille pattern dots-126) | ⠜ (braille pattern dots-345) | ⠩ (braille pattern dots-146) ⠱ (braille pattern dots-156) | ⠼ (braille pattern dots-3456) ⠚ (braille pattern dots-245) ⠴ (braille pattern dots-356) |

Arithmetical symbols are preceded but not followed by a space, with the exception of the multiplication dot. For example:

⠼⠋⠀⠦⠼⠛⠀⠲⠼⠁⠙⠀⠶⠼⠉

6 × 7 : 14 = 3

⠼⠉⠄⠣⠼⠊⠀⠤⠼⠛⠜⠀⠶⠼⠋

3 · (9 − 7) = 6

⠩⠱⠼⠁⠚⠚⠚⠚⠀⠪⠀⠼⠁⠚⠁

$$\sqrt{10000} < 101$$

== Extensions for other languages ==
In print, many languages of the ex–Soviet Union are written in Cyrillic alphabets derived from the Russian alphabet by adding new letters. Their braille alphabets are similarly derived from Russian Braille. The braille assignments for the letters found in Russian print are the same as in Russian Braille. However, there is no international consistency among the additional letters, apart from ⠽ і, which is used in Ukrainian, Belarusian, and Kazakh – and even then, Kyrgyz uses ⠽ for ң (ŋ), and it might be that Tajik uses it for қ (q). Generally not all of the Russian letters are used, except perhaps in Russian loans. Punctuation and formatting, as far as they are attested, agree with Russian Braille, though Kazakh Braille is reported to use the Russian arithmetical parentheses ⠣⠀⠜.

=== Ukrainian Braille ===
Ukrainian has the additional letters і, ї, є, ґ. The є is the mirror image of old Russian э, while і is the old Russian і (that is, it is the mirror image of й, making it the same as French/English y), and ї is old Russian ѣ.

| Print | є | ґ | і | ї |
|---|---|---|---|---|
| Braille | ⠜ (braille pattern dots-345) | ⠻ (braille pattern dots-12456) | ⠽ (braille pattern dots-13456) | ⠹ (braille pattern dots-1456) |

Unesco (2013) was unable to verify these values.

=== Belarusian Braille ===
Belarusian has the additional letters і and ў. They are the mirror images of й and у.

| Print | і | ў |
|---|---|---|
| Braille | ⠽ (braille pattern dots-13456) | ⠬ (braille pattern dots-346) |

Unesco (2013) was unable to verify these values.

=== Kazakh Braille ===
Kazakh has the additional letters ә, ғ, қ, ң, һ, ө, ү, ұ, і.

| Print | ә | ғ | қ | ң | ө | ү | ұ | һ | і |
|---|---|---|---|---|---|---|---|---|---|
| Braille | ⠜ (braille pattern dots-345) | ⠻ (braille pattern dots-12456) | ⠹ (braille pattern dots-1456) | ⠩ (braille pattern dots-146) | ⠣ (braille pattern dots-126) | ⠌ (braille pattern dots-34) | ⠬ (braille pattern dots-346) | ⠧ (braille pattern dots-1236) | ⠽ (braille pattern dots-13456) |

See Kazakh alphabets#Correspondence chart for the whole braille alphabet aligned with the Cyrillic.

=== Kyrgyz Braille ===
Kyrgyz has a subset of the Kazakh letters, ң, ө, ү, but with completely different braille values from the languages above:

| Print | ң | ө | ү |
|---|---|---|---|
| Braille | ⠽ (braille pattern dots-13456) | ⠌ (braille pattern dots-34) | ⠧ (braille pattern dots-1236) |

See Kyrgyz alphabets#Correspondence chart for the whole braille alphabet aligned with the Cyrillic.

=== Mongolian Braille ===
Mongolian has ө, ү, but with different braille assignments again:

| Print | ө ö | ү ü |
|---|---|---|
| Braille | ⠧ (braille pattern dots-1236) | ⠹ (braille pattern dots-1456) |

These are two of the obsolete Russian Braille letters. The Mongolian vowel ө (ö) is coincidentally similar in print to the old Russian consonant ѳ (th), and takes the latter's braille assignment; the Mongolian vowel ү (ü) takes the assignment of the old Russian vowel yat.

See Mongolian Cyrillic alphabet for the whole alphabet aligned with Cyrillic.

=== Additional alphabets ===
Unesco reported additional braille adaptations of Cyrillic in 1990, for Tajik, Turkmen and Uzbek, but was not able to confirm them by 2013. The additional letters in the report are shown here, but like those of Ukrainian and Belarusian, they are unverified and should be treated with caution.

==== Tajik Braille ====
Tajik
| Print | ғ | ӣ | қ | ӯ | ҳ | ҷ |
|---|---|---|---|---|---|---|
| Braille | ⠻ (braille pattern dots-12456) | ⠌ (braille pattern dots-34) | ⠽ (braille pattern dots-13456) | ⠬ (braille pattern dots-346) | ⠹ (braille pattern dots-1456) | ⠧ (braille pattern dots-1236) |

==== Turkmen Braille ====
Turkmen
| Cyrillic | ә | җ | ң | ө | ү |
| Latin | ä | j | ň | ö | ü |
|---|---|---|---|---|---|
| Braille | ⠣ (braille pattern dots-126) | ⠹ (braille pattern dots-1456) | ⠜ (braille pattern dots-345) | ⠧ (braille pattern dots-1236) | ⠽ (braille pattern dots-13456) |

==== Uzbek Braille ====
Uzbek
| Cyrillic | ғ | қ | ў | ҳ |
| Latin | gʻ | q | oʻ | h |
|---|---|---|---|---|
| Braille | ⠻ (braille pattern dots-12456) | ⠽ (braille pattern dots-13456) | ⠧ (braille pattern dots-1236) | ⠹ (braille pattern dots-1456) |

== See also ==
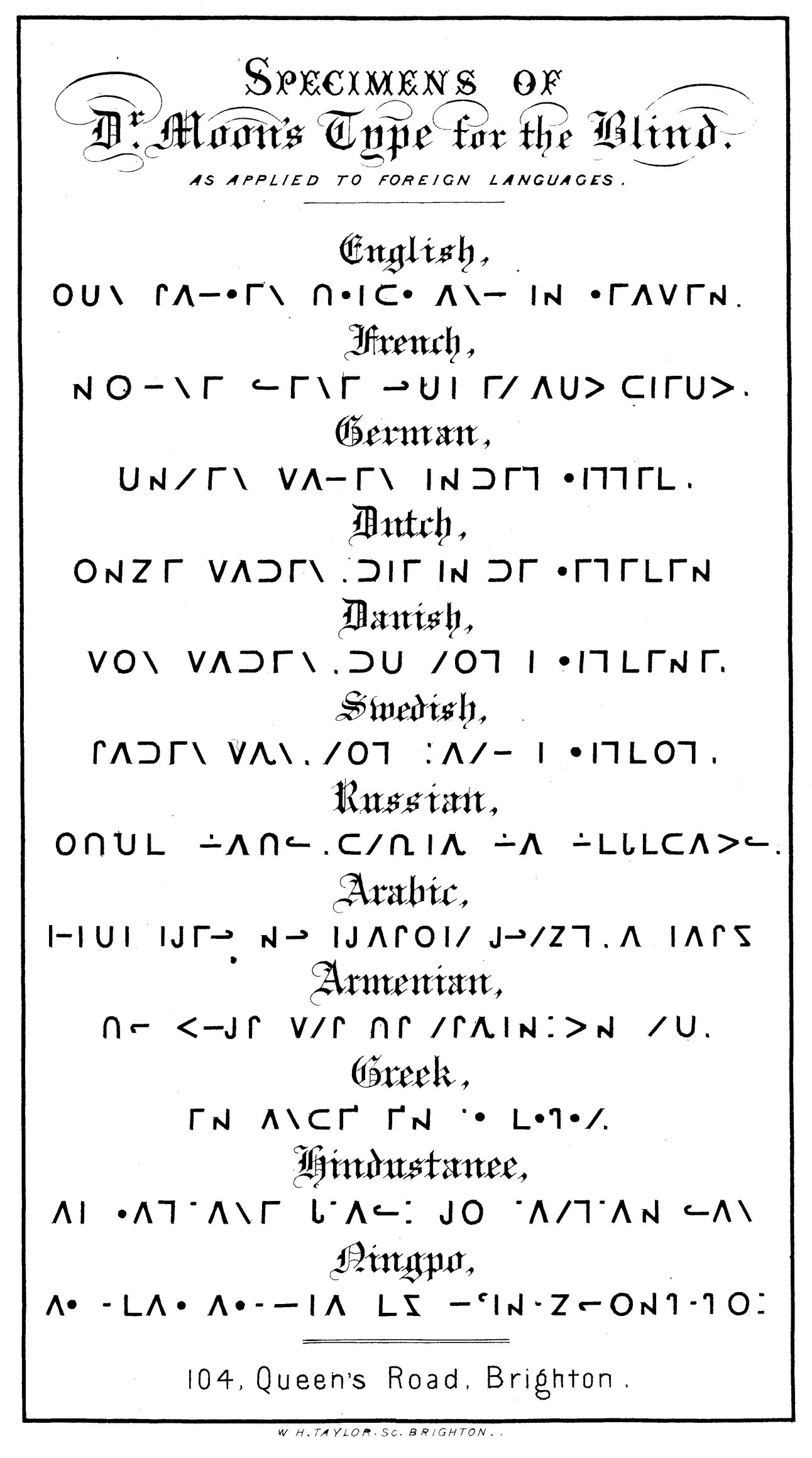
A sample of Moon type in various languages including Russian.

- Moon type is a simplification of the Latin alphabet for embossing. An adaptation for Russian-reading blind people has been proposed.
