= Cyrillic alphabets =

Related alphabets based on Cyrillic scripts

Countries with widespread use of the Cyrillic script: Sole official script Co-official with another script (either because the official language is biscriptal, or the state is bilingual) Being replaced with another script, but is still in official use Legacy script for the official language, or large minority use Cyrillic is not widely used

Numerous Cyrillic alphabets are based on the Cyrillic script. The early Cyrillic alphabet was developed in the 9th century AD and replaced the earlier Glagolitic script developed by the theologians Cyril and Methodius. Cyrillic is one of the most-used writing systems in the world. The script was created at the Preslav Literary School in the First Bulgarian Empire by the disciples of the two Byzantine brothers Cyril and Methodius, who had previously created the Glagolitic script. Among them were Clement of Ohrid, Naum of Preslav, Constantine of Preslav, Joan Ekzarh, Chernorizets Hrabar, Angelar, Sava and other scholars. It is the basis of alphabets used in various languages, past and present, Slavic origin, and non-Slavic languages influenced by Russian. As of 2011, around 252 million people in Eurasia use it as the official alphabet for their national languages. About half of them are in Russia.

Some of these are illustrated below; for others, and for more detail, see the links. Sounds are transcribed in the IPA. While these languages largely have phonemic orthographies, there are occasional exceptions—for example, Russian ⟨г⟩ is pronounced /v/ in a number of words, an orthographic relic from when they were pronounced /ɡ/ (e.g. его yego 'him/his', is pronounced [jɪˈvo] rather than [jɪˈɡo]).

Spellings of names transliterated into the Roman alphabet may vary, especially й (y/j/i), but also г (gh/g/h) and ж (zh/j).

Unlike the Latin script, which is usually adapted to different languages by adding diacritical marks/supplementary glyphs (such as acutes and carons) to standard Roman letters, by assigning new phonetic values to existing letters (e.g. ⟨q⟩, whose original value in Latin was /kʷ/, represents /g/ in Azerbaijani, /t͡ɕʰ/ in Mandarin Chinese Pinyin, /q/ in many other languages and /ǃ/ in some Bantu languages), or by the use of digraphs (such as ⟨sh⟩), the Cyrillic script is usually adapted by the creation of entirely new letter shapes. However, in some alphabets invented in the 19th century, such as Chuvash, umlauts and breves also were used.

Bulgarian and Bosnian Sephardim without Hebrew typefaces occasionally printed Judeo-Spanish in Cyrillic.

== Spread ==
Non-Slavic alphabets are generally modelled after Russian, but often bear striking differences, particularly when adapted for Caucasian languages. The first few of these alphabets were developed by Orthodox missionaries for the Finnic and Turkic peoples of Idel-Ural (Mari, Udmurt, Mordva, Chuvash, and Kerashen Tatars) in the 1870s. Later, such alphabets were created for some of the Siberian and Caucasus peoples who had recently converted to Christianity. In the 1930s, some of those languages were switched to the New Turkic Alphabet. All of the peoples of the former Soviet Union who had been using an Arabic or a different Asian script also adopted Cyrillic alphabets, and during the Great Purge in the late 1930s, all of the Latin alphabets of the peoples of the Soviet Union were switched to Cyrillic as well (Lithuania, Latvia and Estonia were occupied and annexed by the Soviet Union in 1940, and were not affected by this change). The Abkhazian and Ossetian languages were switched to the Mkhedruli script, but after the death of Joseph Stalin, both also adopted Cyrillic. The last language to adopt Cyrillic was the Gagauz language, which had used Greek script before.

In Uzbekistan, Azerbaijan and Turkmenistan, the use of Cyrillic to write local languages has often been a politically controversial issue since the collapse of the Soviet Union, as it evokes the era of Soviet rule and Russification. Some of Russia's peoples such as the Tatars have also tried to drop Cyrillic, but the move was halted under Russian law. A number of languages have switched from Cyrillic to either a Roman-based orthography or a return to a former script.

Cyrillic alphabets continue to be used in several Slavic (Russian, Ukrainian, Serbian, Bulgarian, Macedonian, Belarusian) and non-Slavic (Kazakh, Uzbek, Kyrgyz, Tajik, Gagauz, Mongolian) languages.

== Common letters ==
The following table lists the Cyrillic letters which are used in the alphabets of most of the national languages which use a Cyrillic alphabet. Exceptions and additions for particular languages are noted below.

Common Cyrillic letters
Upright	Italic	Name(s)	IPA
А а	А а	A	/a/
Б б	Б б	Be	/b/
В в	В в	Ve	/v/
Г г	Г г	Ge	/g/
Д д	Д д	De	/d/
Е е	Е е	E; Je; Ye	/je/; /ʲe/
Ж ж	Ж ж	Že; Zhe	/ʒ/
З з	З з	Ze	/z/
И и	И и	I	/i/; /ʲi/
Й й	Й й	Short I (Note: Russian: и краткое, i kratkoye; Bulgarian: и кратко, i kratko. Both mean "short i".)	/j/
К к	К к	Ka	/k/
Л л	Л л	El	/l/
М м	М м	Em	/m/
Н н	Н н	En; Ne	/n/
О о	О о	O	/o/
П п	П п	Pe	/p/
Р р	Р р	Er; Re	/r/
С с	С с	Es; Se	/s/
Т т	Т т	Te	/t/
У у	У у	U	/u/
Ф ф	Ф ф	Ef; Fe	/f/
Х х	Х х	Xa; Kha	/x/
Ц ц	Ц ц	Ce; Tse	/ts/; (t͡s)
Ч ч	Ч ч	Če; Che	/tʃ/; (t͡ʃ)
Ш ш	Ш ш	Ša; Sha	/ʃ/
Ь ь	Ь ь	Soft sign (Note: Russian: мягкий знак, myagkiy znak); Small yer (Note: Bulgarian: ер малък, er malâk)	/ʲ/ (Note: The soft sign ⟨ь⟩ usually does not represent a sound, but modifies the sound of the preceding letter, indicating palatalization ("softening"), also separates the consonant and the following vowel. Sometimes it does not have phonetic meaning, just orthographic; e.g. Russian туш, tush [tuʂ] 'flourish after a toast'; тушь, tushʹ [tuʂ] 'India ink'. In some languages, a hard sign ⟨ъ⟩ or apostrophe ⟨’⟩ just separates the consonant and the following vowel (бя [bʲa], бья [bʲja], бъя = б’я [bja]).)
Ю ю	Ю ю	Ju; Yu	/ju/; /ʲu/
Я я	Я я	Ja; Ya	/ja/; /ʲa/

== Slavic languages ==
Cyrillic alphabets used by Slavic languages can be divided into two categories:

- West South Slavic languages, such as all varieties of Serbo-Croatian, often share the following letters, among others: Ј, Љ, Њ
- East South Slavic languages and East Slavic languages, such as Bulgarian and Russian, often share the following letters, among others: Й, Щ, Ь (soft sign), Ю, Я

=== South Slavic ===
==== Bulgarian ====
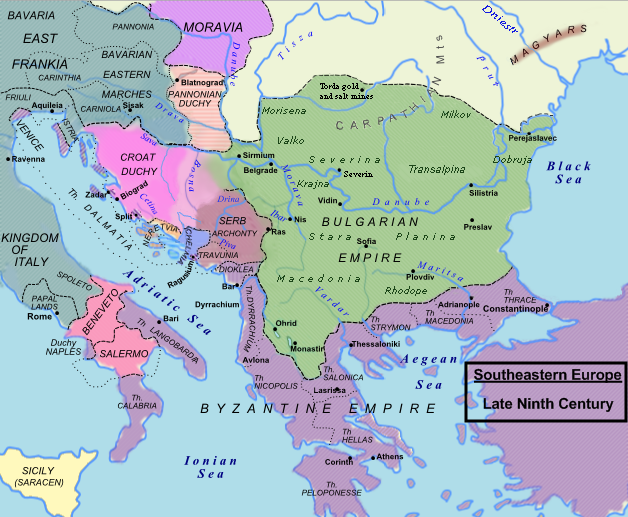
First Bulgarian Empire, 9th century (850)

The Bulgarian Cyrillic alphabet
А а	Б б	В в	Г г	Д д	Е е	Ж ж	З з	И и	Й й
К к	Л л	М м	Н н	О о	П п	Р р	С с	Т т	У у
Ф ф	Х х	Ц ц	Ч ч	Ш ш	Щ щ	Ъ ъ	Ь ь	Ю ю	Я я

The Bulgarian alphabet shows the following features:

- The Bulgarian names for the consonants are [bɤ], [kɤ], [ɫɤ] (bǔ, kǔ, lǔ) etc. instead of [bɛ], [ka], [ɛl] (be, ka, el) etc.
- Е represents /ɛ/ and is called "е" [ɛ]. Unlike in other Slavic languages, the sound [jɛ] does not exist in native words, being replaced with Е in most cases.
- The sounds /dʒ/ (/d͡ʒ/) and /dz/ (/d͡z/) are represented by the digraphs дж and дз respectively, as in Belarusian and Ukrainian.
- Short I (Й, й) represents /j/, as in Russian.
- Щ represents /ʃt/ (/ʃ͡t/) and is called "щъ" [ʃtɤ] ([ʃ͡tɤ]).
- Ъ represents the vowel /ɤ/, and is called "ер голям" (IPA: [ˈɛr ɡoˈʎam]) ('big er'). Despite the official name being "big er", the letter is only referred to as that in the context of the alphabet, and is usually called /ɤ/ in common speech. The vowel Ъ /ɤ/ is sometimes approximated to the /ə/ (schwa) sound found in many languages for easier comprehension of its Bulgarian pronunciation for foreigners, but it is actually a back vowel, not a central vowel.
- Ь is used on rare occasions (only after a consonant [and] before the vowel "о"), such as in the words 'каньон' (canyon), 'шофьор' (driver/chauffeur), etc. It represents the sound [j], unless after Г, К and Л, in which case it palatalizes them to [ɟ], [c] and [ʎ]. It is called "ер малък" [ˈɛr ˈmalɐk] ('small er').
- Before 1945, the letter Ѣ (yat) was used. In eastern dialects, the letter would be pronounced as [ɛ] or [ja] depending on the context, while in western dialects, it would be pronounced almost exclusively as [ɛ]. This led to cases in which words such as млѣко (Modern Bulgarian: мляко) would be pronounced as "mlyako" in the east, but as "mleko" in the west. In 1945, the letter was abolished and replaced by Я or Е, depending on its use in the eastern dialects. The letter is also referred to as "е двойно" (double e).
- Before 1945, the letter Ѫ (big yus) was used. In early Bulgarian, the letter represented the nasal vowel [ɔ̃]. By the late 18th century however, the sound had shifted to /ɤ/, the same sound as Ъ, and was mostly used in its etymological locations. There are no differences between the two, apart from the fact that Ѫ can be used at the end of words. In 1945, the letter was abolished along with Ѣ (yat) and was replaced by А or Ъ. It is sometimes referred to as "голяма носовка" (big nasal sign) and "ъ широко" (wide ъ).
- For a brief period, the letter Ѭ (iotated big yus) was used, during the use of the Drinov Orthography, and represented the sound [jɐ] or /jɤ/ in words verb conjugations, for example in търпѭ (IPA: /tɐrˈpjɤ/). The letter Ѫ was also used for the same purpose alongside its normal usage. In 1899, both letters replaced in verb conjugations by Я and А in all cases as part of the new Ivanchov Orthography.

The Cyrillic alphabet was originally developed in the First Bulgarian Empire during the 9th – 10th century AD at the Preslav Literary School.

It has been used in Bulgaria (with modifications and exclusion of certain archaic letters via spelling reforms) continuously since then, superseding the previously used Glagolitic alphabet, which was also invented and used there before the Cyrillic script overtook its use as a written script for the Bulgarian language. The Cyrillic alphabet was used in the then much bigger territory of Bulgaria (including most of today's Serbia), North Macedonia, Kosovo, Albania, Northern Greece (Macedonia region), Romania and Moldova, officially from 893. It was also transferred from Bulgaria and adopted by the East Slavic languages in Kievan Rus' and evolved into the Russian alphabet and the alphabets of many other Slavic (and later non-Slavic) languages. Later, some Slavs modified it and added/excluded letters from it to better suit the needs of their own language varieties.

==== Serbian ====
Alternate variants of lowercase Cyrillic letters: Б/б, Д/д, Г/г, И/и, П/п, Т/т, Ш/ш. Default Russian (Eastern) forms on the left. Alternate Bulgarian (Western) upright forms in the middle. Alternate Serbian/Macedonian (Southern) italic forms on the right. See also:

South Slavic Cyrillic alphabets (with the exception of Bulgarian) are generally derived from Serbian Cyrillic. It, and by extension its descendants, differs from the East Slavic ones in that the alphabet has generally been simplified: Letters such as Й, Я, Ю, and Щ representing /j/, /ja/, /ju/, and /ɕ(ː)/ in Russian, respectively, have been removed. Instead, these are represented by the letter ⟨Ј⟩ and digraphs ⟨ја⟩, ⟨ју⟩, and ⟨шч/шт⟩, respectively. Additionally, the letter Е, representing /je/ in Russian, is instead pronounced /e/ or /ɛ/, with /je/ being represented by ⟨је⟩. Alphabets based on the Serbian that add new letters often do so by adding an acute accent ⟨´⟩ over an existing letter.

The Serbian Cyrillic alphabet
А а	Б б	В в	Г г	Д д	Ђ ђ	Е е	Ж ж	З з	И и
Ј ј	К к	Л л	Љ љ	М м	Н н	Њ њ	О о	П п	Р р
С с	Т т	Ћ ћ	У у	Ф ф	Х х	Ц ц	Ч ч	Џ џ	Ш ш

The Serbian alphabet shows the following features:

- E represents /ɛ/.
- Between Д and E is the letter Dje (Ђ, ђ), representing /dʑ/, which looks like Tshe, except that the loop of the h curls farther and dips downwards.
- Between И and К is the letter Je (Ј, ј), representing /j/, which looks like the Latin letter J.
- Between Л and М is the letter Lje (Љ, љ), representing /ʎ/, which looks like a ligature of Л and the Soft Sign.
- Between Н and О is the letter Nje (Њ, њ), representing /ɲ/, which looks like a ligature of Н and the Soft Sign.
- Between Т and У is the letter Tshe (Ћ, ћ), representing /tɕ/ and looks like a lowercase Latin letter h with a bar. On the uppercase letter, the bar appears at the top; on the lowercase letter, the bar crosses the top at half of the vertical line.
- Between Ч and Ш is the letter Dzhe (Џ, џ), representing /dʒ/, which looks like Tse but with the descender moved from the right side of the bottom bar to the middle of the bottom bar.
- Ш is the last letter.
- Certain letters are handwritten differently, as seen in the adjacent image.

==== Montenegrin ====
The Montenegrin Cyrillic alphabet
А а	Б б	В в	Г г	Д д	Ђ ђ	Е е	Ж ж	З з	З́ з́	И и
Ј ј	К к	Л л	Љ љ	М м	Н н	Њ њ	О о	П п	Р р	С с
С́ с́	Т т	Ћ ћ	У у	Ф ф	Х х	Ц ц	Ч ч	Џ џ	Ш ш

The Montenegrin alphabet differs from Serbian in the following ways:

- Between Ze (З з) and I (И и) is the letter З́, which represents /ʑ/ (voiced alveolo-palatal fricative). It is written ⟨Ź ź⟩ in the corresponding Montenegrin Latin alphabet, previously written ⟨Zj zj⟩ or ⟨Žj žj⟩.
- Between Es (С с) and Te (Т т) is the letter С́, which represents /ɕ/ (voiceless alveolo-palatal fricative). It is written ⟨Ś ś⟩ in the corresponding Montenegrin Latin alphabet, previously written ⟨Sj sj⟩ or ⟨Šj šj⟩.
- The letter Dze (Ѕ ѕ), from Macedonian, is used in scientific literature when representing the /d͡z/ phoneme, although it is not officially part of the alphabet. A Latin equivalent was proposed that looks identical to Ze (З з).

==== Macedonian ====
Macedonian cursive

The Macedonian Cyrillic alphabet
А а	Б б	В в	Г г	Д д	Ѓ ѓ	Е е	Ж ж	З з	Ѕ ѕ	И и
Ј ј	К к	Л л	Љ љ	М м	Н н	Њ њ	О о	П п	Р р	С с
Т т	Ќ ќ	У у	Ф ф	Х х	Ц ц	Ч ч	Џ џ	Ш ш

The Macedonian alphabet differs from Serbian in the following ways:

- Between Ze (З з) and I (И и) is the letter Dze (Ѕ ѕ), which looks like the Latin letter S and represents /d͡z/.
- Dje (Ђ ђ) is replaced by Gje (Ѓ ѓ), which represents /ɟ/ (voiced palatal stop). In some dialects, it represents /d͡ʑ/ instead, like Dje. It is written ⟨Ǵ ǵ⟩ in the corresponding Macedonian Latin alphabet.
- Tshe (Ћ ћ) is replaced by Kje (Ќ ќ), which represents /c/ (voiceless palatal stop). In some dialects, it represents /t͡ɕ/ instead, like Tshe. It is written ⟨Ḱ ḱ⟩ in the corresponding Macedonian Latin alphabet.
- Lje (Љ љ) often represents the consonant cluster /lj/ instead of /ʎ/.
- Certain letters are handwritten differently, as seen in the adjacent image.

==== Serbian, Bosnian and Croatian ====
Ćiro Truhelka claimed Serbo-Croatian language briefly used the Cyrillic script in areas with large Croatian or Bosnian speaking populations. There is a controversy in naming. Bosniak scholars call it Bosnian Script. Serb scholars call it Serbian script, as part of variant of Serbian Cyrillic and deem the term "bosančica" Anti-Serb Austro-Hungarian propaganda. Croat scholars call it Croatian Cyrillic.

=== East Slavic ===
==== Russian ====
The Russian Cyrillic alphabet
А а	Б б	В в	Г г	Д д (∂)	Е е	Ё ё	Ж ж	З з	И и	Й й
К к	Л л	М м	Н н	О о	П п	Р р	С с	Т т	У у	Ф ф
Х х	Ц ц	Ч ч	Ш ш	Щ щ	(Ъ) ъ	(Ы) ы	(Ь) ь	Э э	Ю ю	Я я

The Russian alphabet shows the following features:

- Yo (Ё ё) indicates /jo/.
- As /f/ is not a native phoneme, the letter Ef (Ф ф) is generally restricted to loanwords/borrowed words.
- Zhe (Ж ж) and Sha (Ш ш) indicate sounds that are retroflex.
- Shcha (Щ щ) indicates /ɕ(ː)/.
- The hard sign¹ (Ъ ъ), called “твёрдый знак” in Russian, indicates the lack of palatalization in a context where the consonant would usually be palatalized².
- Yery (Ы ы) indicates [ɨ] (an allophone of /i/).
- E (Э э) indicates /ɛ/.

Notes:

1. In the pre-reform Russian orthography, in Old Russian and in Old Church Slavonic the letter is called yer. Historically, the "hard sign" takes the place of a now-absent vowel, which is still preserved as a distinct vowel in Bulgarian (which represents it with ъ) and Slovene (which is written in the Latin alphabet and writes it as e), but only in some places in the word.
2. When an iotated vowel (vowel whose sound begins with [j]) follows a consonant, the consonant is palatalized. The hard sign indicates that this does not happen, and the [j] sound will appear only in front of the vowel. The soft sign indicates that the consonant should be palatalized in addition to a [j] preceding the vowel. The soft sign also indicates that a consonant before another consonant or at the end of a word is palatalized. Examples: та ([ta]); тя ([tʲa]); тья ([tʲja]); тъя ([tja]); т (/t/); ть ([tʲ]).

Before 1918, there were four extra letters in use: Іі (replaced by Ии), Ѳѳ (Фита "Fita", replaced by Фф), Ѣѣ (Ять "Yat", replaced by Ее), and Ѵѵ (ижица "Izhitsa", replaced by Ии); these were eliminated by reforms of Russian orthography.

==== Belarusian ====
The Belarusian Cyrillic alphabet
А а	Б б	В в	Г г	Д д	Е е	Ё ё	Ж ж	З з	І і	Й й	К к
Л л	М м	Н н	О о	П п	Р р	С с	Т т	У у	Ў ў	Ф ф	Х х
Ц ц	Ч ч	Ш ш	Ы ы	Ь ь	Э э	Ю ю	Я я	'

The Belarusian alphabet shows the following features:

- He or Ge (Г г) represents a voiced velar fricative /ɣ/ (rarely also a voiced velar plosive /ɡ/).
- Yo (Ё ё) represents /jo/, just like in Russian.
- I (І і), also known as the dotted I or decimal I, resembles the Latin letter I. Unlike most Cyrillic alphabets, "И" is not used.
  - Short I (Й й), however, uses the base И glyph.
- Short U (Ў ў) is the letter У with a breve and represents /w/, or like the u part of the diphthong in loud. The use of the breve to indicate a semivowel is analogous to the Short I (Й).
- A combination of Sh and Ch (ШЧ шч) is used where those familiar only with Russian and or Ukrainian would expect Shcha (Щ щ).
- Yery (Ы ы) represents /ɨ/, similarly to in Russian.
- E (Э э) represents /ɛ/, just like in Russian.
- An apostrophe (’) is used to indicate the lack of palatalization of the preceding consonant. This orthographical symbol is used instead of the traditional Cyrillic letter Yer (Ъ), also known as the hard sign.
- The letter combinations Dzh (Дж дж) and Dz (Дз дз) appear after D (Д д) in the Belarusian alphabet in some publications. These digraphs represent the affricates Дж /d͡ʒ/ and Дз /d͡z/ correspondingly.
- Before 1933, the letter Ґ ґ (Ge) was used for /ɡ/, although its use was optional.

==== Ukrainian ====
The Ukrainian Cyrillic alphabet
А а	Б б	В в	Г г	Ґ ґ	Д д	Е е	Є є	Ж ж	З з	И и
І і	Ї ї	Й й	К к	Л л	М м	Н н	О о	П п	Р р	С с
Т т	У у	Ф ф	Х х	Ц ц	Ч ч	Ш ш	Щ щ	Ь ь	Ю ю	Я я

The Ukrainian alphabet shows the following features:

- Ve (В в) represents /ʋ/ (which may be pronounced [w] in a word final position and before consonants).
- He (Г г) represents a breathy-voiced glottal transition, (/ɦ/), similar to the respective sound in Belarusian.
- Ge (Ґ ґ) appears after He, representing /ɡ/. It looks like He with an "upturn" pointing up from the right side of the top bar. This letter is generally restricted to loanwords/borrowed words. (This letter was removed in Soviet Ukraine in 1933–1990, so it may be missing from older Cyrillic fonts.)
- E (Е е) represents /ɛ/.
- Ye (Є є) appears after E and represents the sound /jɛ/.
- I (И и) represents the sound /ɪ/, unlike in Russian.
- Dotted I (І і) appears after И and represents the sound /i/, as in Belarusian.
- Yi (Ї ї) appears after I and represents the sound /ji/.
- Jot (Й й) represents /j/, as in Russian
- Shcha (Щ, щ) represents the cluster /ʃt͡ʃ/.
- An apostrophe (’) is used to mark the lack of palatalization of the preceding consonant before Ya (Я, я), Yu (Ю, ю), Ye (Є, є), Yi (Ї, ї), the same as how it is used in Belarusian.
- Before 1990, Ь was positioned at the end of the alphabet rather than in its current position after Щ; the original order may still show up in historic documents.
- As in Belarusian Cyrillic, the sounds /dʒ/, /dz/ are represented by digraphs Дж and Дз respectively.

==== Carpathian Rusyn ====
The Carpathian Rusyn language is spoken by the Carpatho-Rusyns in Carpathian Ruthenia, Slovakia, and Poland.

The Carpathian Rusyn Cyrillic alphabet
А а	Б б	В в	Г г	Ґ ґ	Д д	Е е	Є є	Ё ё	Ж ж	З з	І і
Ї ї	И и	Ы ы	Й й	К к	Л л	М м	Н н	О о	П п	Р р	С с
Т т	У у	Ф ф	Х х	Ц ц	Ч ч	Ш ш	Щ щ	Ю ю	Я я	Ь ь	Ъ ъ

The Carpathian Rusyn alphabet differs from Ukrainian in that the letters Ё, Ы, and the hard sign (Ъ), from Russian, are also used, and the order is slightly different.

=== West Slavic ===
==== Pannonian Rusyn ====
The Pannonian Rusyn language is spoken by the Pannonian Rusyns.

The Pannonian Rusyn alphabet
А а	Б б	В в	Г г	Ґ ґ	Д д	Е е	Є є	Ж ж	З з	И и
Ї ї	Й й	К к	Л л	М м	Н н	О о	П п	Р р	С с	Т т
У у	Ф ф	Х х	Ц ц	Ч ч	Ш ш	Щ щ	Ю ю	Я я	Ь ь

This alphabet uses all the letters of the Ukrainian alphabet except Dotted I (І і). Note that Pannonian Rusyn is a West Slavic language despite its name.

== Non-Slavic Indo-European languages ==
=== Romance languages ===
Romanian Cyrillic alphabet

==== Romanian and Moldovan ====
The Romanian language used the Cyrillic script up to the 19th century (see Romanian Cyrillic alphabet).

The Moldovan language (an alternative name of the Romanian language in Bessarabia, Moldavian ASSR, Moldavian SSR and Moldova) used varieties of the Romanian Cyrillic alphabet in 1812–1918, and the Moldovan Cyrillic alphabet (derived from the Russian alphabet and standardised in the Soviet Union) in 1924–1932 and 1938–1989. Nowadays, this alphabet is still official in the unrecognized republic of Transnistria (see Moldovan Cyrillic alphabet).

==== Ladino ====
Ladino uses the Cyrillic script in occasional Bulgarian Sephardic publications.

=== Indo-Aryan ===
==== Romani ====
Romani is written in Cyrillic in Serbia, Montenegro, Bulgaria and the former USSR.

=== Iranian ===
==== Kurdish ====
Kurds in the former Soviet Union use a Cyrillic alphabet:

Kurdish Cyrillic Orthography
А а	Б б	В в	Г г	Г' г'	Д д	Е е
Ә ә	Ә' ә'	Ж ж	З з	И и	Й й	К к
К' к'	Л л	М м	Н н	О о	Ӧ ö	П п
П' п'	Р р	Р' р'	С с	Т т	Т' т'	У у
Ф ф	Х х	Һ һ	Һ' һ'	Ч ч	Ч' ч'	Ш ш
Щ щ	Ь ь	Э э	Ԛ ԛ	Ԝ ԝ

==== Ossetic ====
The Ossetic language has officially used the Cyrillic script since 1937.

Ossetian Cyrillic script
А а	Ӕ ӕ	Б б	В в	Г г	Гъ гъ	Д д	Дж дж
Дз дз	Е е	Ё ё	Ж ж	З з	И и	Й й	К к
Къ къ	Л л	М м	Н н	О о	П п	Пъ пъ	Р р
С с	Т т	Тъ тъ	У у	Ф ф	Х х	Хъ хъ	Ц ц
Цъ цъ	Ч ч	Чъ чъ	Ш ш	Щ щ	Ъ ъ	Ы ы	Ь ь
Э э	Ю ю	Я я

==== Tajik ====
The Tajik alphabet is written using a Cyrillic-based alphabet.

Tajik-Persian Cyrillic Alphabet
А а	Б б	В в	Г г	Ғ ғ	Д д	Е е	Ё ё	Ж ж	З з	И и
Ӣ ӣ	Й й	К к	Қ қ	Л л	М м	Н н	О о	П п	Р р	С с
Т т	У у	Ӯ ӯ	Ф ф	Х х	Ҳ ҳ	Ч ч	Ҷ ҷ	Ш ш	Ъ ъ	Э э
Ю ю	Я я

==== Other ====
- Judeo-Tat
- Yaghnobi
- Yazghulami

== Uralic languages ==
Uralic languages using the Cyrillic script (currently or in the past) include:

- Finnic: Karelian until 1921 and 1937–1940 (Ludic, Olonets Karelian); Veps; Votic
- Sami: Kildin Sami and Ter Sami in Russia (since the 1980s)
- Komi (Zyrian (since the 17th century, modern alphabet since the 1930s); Permyak; Yodzyak)
- Udmurt
- Khanty
- Mansi (writing has not received distribution since 1937)
- Samoyedic: Enets; Yurats; Nenets since 1937 (Forest Nenets; Tundra Nenets); Nganasan; Kamassian; Koibal; Mator; Selkup (since the 1950s; not used recently)
- Mari, since the 19th century (Hill; Meadow)
- Mordvin, since the 18th century (Erzya; Moksha)
- Other: Merya; Muromian; Meshcherian

=== Karelian ===
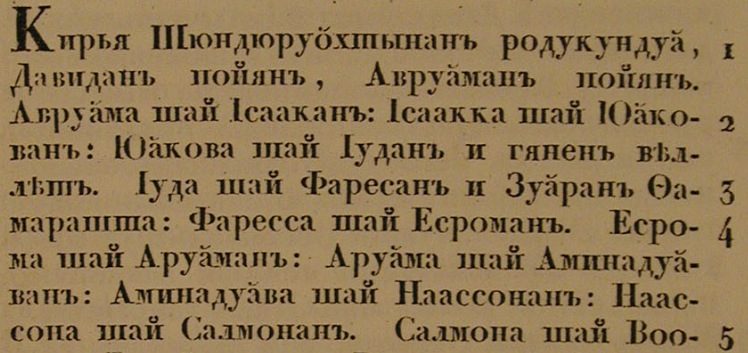
The first lines of the Book of Matthew in Karelian using the Cyrillic script, 1820

The Karelian language was written in the Cyrillic script in various forms until 1940 when publication in Karelian ceased in favor of Finnish, except for Tver Karelian, written in a Latin alphabet. In 1989 publication began again in the other Karelian dialects and Latin alphabets were used, in some cases with the addition of Cyrillic letters such as ь.

=== Kildin Sámi ===
Over the last century, the alphabet used to write Kildin Sámi has changed three times: from Cyrillic to Latin and back again to Cyrillic. Work on the latest version of the official orthography commenced in 1979. It was officially approved in 1982 and started to be widely used by 1987.

=== Komi-Permyak ===
The Komi-Permyak Cyrillic alphabet:

А а	Б б	В в	Г г	Д д	Е е	Ё ё
Ж ж	З з	И и	І і	Й й	К к	Л л
М м	Н н	О о	Ӧ ӧ	П п	Р р	С с
Т т	У у	Ф ф	Х х	Ц ц	Ч ч	Ш ш
Щ щ	Ъ ъ	Ы ы	Ь ь	Э э	Ю ю	Я я

=== Mari alphabets ===
Meadow Mari Cyrillic alphabet:

А а	Б б	В в	Г г	Д д	Е е	Ё ё	Ж ж	З з
И и	Й й	К к	Л л	М м	Н н	Ҥ ҥ	О о	Ӧ ӧ
П п	Р р	С с	Т т	У у	Ӱ ӱ	Ф ф	Х х	Ц ц
Ч ч	Ш ш	Щ щ	Ъ ъ	Ы ы	Ь ь	Э э	Ю ю	Я я

Hill Mari Cyrillic alphabet

А а	Ӓ ӓ	Б б	В в	Г г	Д д	Е е	Ё ё	Ж ж	З з
И и	Й й	К к	Л л	М м	Н н	О о	Ӧ ӧ	П п	Р р
С с	Т т	У у	Ӱ ӱ	Ф ф	Х х	Ц ц	Ч ч	Ш ш	Щ щ
Ъ ъ	Ы ы	Ӹ ӹ	Ь ь	Э э	Ю ю	Я я

== Turkic languages ==
=== Azerbaijani ===
The Azerbaijani Cyrillic alphabet
First version (1939–1958):	Аа	Бб	Вв	Гг	Ғғ	Дд	Ее	Әә	Жж	Зз	Ии	Йй	Кк	Ҝҝ	Лл	Мм	Нн	Оо
	Өө	Пп	Рр	Сс	Тт	Уу	Үү	Фф	Хх	Һһ	Цц	Чч	Ҹҹ	Шш	Ыы	Ээ	Юю	Яя	ʼ
Second version (1958–1991): still used today by Dagestan	Аа	Бб	Вв	Гг	Ғғ	Дд	Ее	Әә	Жж	Зз	Ии	Ыы	Јј	Кк	Ҝҝ	Лл	Мм	Нн
	Оо	Өө	Пп	Рр	Сс	Тт	Уу	Үү	Фф	Хх	Һһ	Чч	Ҹҹ	Шш	ʼ

Latin Alphabet (as of 1992)
Aa, Bb, Cc, Çç, Dd, Ee, Əə, Ff, Gg, Ğğ, Hh, Xx, Iı, İi, Jj, Kk, Qq, Ll, Mm, Nn, Oo, Öö, Pp, Rr, Ss, Şş, Tt, Uu, Üü, Vv, Yy, Zz

=== Bashkir ===
The Cyrillic script was used for the Bashkir language after the winter of 1938.

The Bashkir Cyrillic alphabet
А а	Б б	В в	Г г	Ғ ғ	Д д	Ҙ ҙ	Е е	Ё ё	Ж ж	З з
И и	Й й	К к	Ҡ ҡ	Л л	М м	Н н	Ң ң	О о	Ө ө	П п
Р р	С с	Ҫ ҫ	Т т	У у	Ү ү	Ф ф	Х х	Һ һ	Ц ц	Ч ч
Ш ш	Щ щ	Ъ ъ	Ы ы	Ь ь	Э э	Ә ә	Ю ю	Я я

=== Chuvash ===
The Cyrillic alphabet is used for the Chuvash language since the late 19th century, with some changes in 1938.

The Chuvash Cyrillic alphabet
А а	Ӑ ӑ	Б б	В в	Г г	Д д	Е е	Ё ё	Ӗ ӗ	Ж ж	З з
И и	Й й	К к	Л л	М м	Н н	О о	П п	Р р	С с	Ҫ ҫ
Т т	У у	Ӳ ӳ	Ф ф	Х х	Ц ц	Ч ч	Ш ш	Щ щ	Ъ ъ	Ы ы
Ь ь	Э э	Ю ю	Я я

The Cyrillic letters Бб, Гг, Дд, Ёё, Жж, Зз, Оо, Фф, Цц, Щщ and Ъъ are not used in native Chuvash words, but only for Russian loans.

=== Kazakh ===
Kazakh can be alternatively written in the Latin alphabet. Latin is expected to entirely replace Cyrillic by the 2030s, alongside the modified Arabic alphabet (in the People's Republic of China, Iran and Afghanistan).

The Kazakh Cyrillic alphabet
А а	Ә ә	Б б	В в	Г г	Ғ ғ	Д д	Е е	Ё ё	Ж ж	З з
И и	Й й	К к	Қ қ	Л л	М м	Н н	Ң ң	О о	Ө ө	П п
Р р	С с	Т т	У у	Ұ ұ	Ү ү	Ф ф	Х х	Һ һ	Ц ц	Ч ч
Ш ш	Щ щ	Ъ ъ	Ы ы	І і	Ь ь	Э э	Ю ю	Я я

- Ә ә = /æ/
- Ғ ғ = /ʁ/ (voiced uvular fricative)
- Е е = /jɪ/
- И и = /ɪj/, /ɘj/
- Қ қ = /q/ (voiceless uvular plosive)
- Ң ң = /ŋ/, /ɴ/
- О о = /o/, /ʷo/, /ʷʊ/
- Ө ө = /œ/, /ʷœ/, /ʷʏ/
- У у = /ʊw/, /ʉw/, /w/
- Ұ ұ = /ʊ/
- Ү ү = /ʉ/, /ʏ/
- Һ һ = /h/
- Щ щ = /ʃʃ/
- Ы ы = /ɯ/, /ә/
- І і = /ɪ/, /ɘ/

The Cyrillic letters Вв, Ёё, Цц, Чч, Ъъ, Ьь and Ээ are not used in native Kazakh words, but only for Russian loans.

=== Kyrgyz ===
Kyrgyz has also been written in Latin and in Arabic.

The Kyrgyz Cyrillic alphabet
А а	Б б	В в	Г г	Д д	Е е	Ё ё	Ж ж	З з	И и	Й й	К к
Л л	М м	Н н	Ң ң	О о	Ө ө	П п	Р р	С с	Т т	У у	Ү ү
Ф ф	Х х	Ц ц	Ч ч	Ш ш	Щ щ	Ъ ъ	Ы ы	Ь ь	Э э	Ю ю	Я я

- Ң ң = /ŋ/ (velar nasal)
- Ү ү = /y/ (close front rounded vowel)
- Ө ө = /œ/ (open-mid front rounded vowel)

Bold letters are used only in loanwords.

=== Tatar ===
Tatar has used Cyrillic since 1939, but the Russian Orthodox Tatar community has used Cyrillic since the 19th century. In 2000 a new Latin alphabet was adopted for Tatar, but it is used generally on the Internet.

The Tatar Cyrillic alphabet
А а	Ә ә	Б б	В в	Г г	Д д	Е е	Ё ё	Ж ж	Җ җ
З з	И и	Й й	К к	Л л	М м	Н н	Ң ң	О о	Ө ө
П п	Р р	С с	Т т	У у	Ү ү	Ф ф	Х х	Һ һ	Ц ц
Ч ч	Ш ш	Щ щ	Ъ ъ	Ы ы	Ь ь	Э э	Ю ю	Я я

- Ә ә = /æ/
- Ң ң = /ŋ/
- Ө ө = /œ/
- У у = /uw/, /yw/, /w/
- Ү ү = /y/
- Һ һ = /h/
- Җ җ = /ʑ/

The Cyrillic letters Ёё, Цц, Щщ are not used in native Tatar words, but only for Russian loans.

=== Turkmen ===
Turkmen, written 1940–1994 exclusively in Cyrillic, since 1994 officially in Roman, but in everyday communication Cyrillic is still used along with Roman script.

The Turkmen Cyrillic alphabet
А а	Б б	В в	Г г	Д д	Е е	Ё ё	Ж ж	Җ җ	З з	И и	Й й
К к	Л л	М м	Н н	Ң ң	О о	Ө ө	П п	Р р	С с	Т т	У у
Ү ү	Ф ф	Х х	(Ц ц)	Ч ч	Ш ш	(Щ щ)	(Ъ ъ)	Ы ы	(Ь ь)	Э э	Ә ә
Ю ю	Я я

=== Uzbek ===
From 1941 the Cyrillic script was used exclusively. In 1998 the government has adopted a Latin alphabet to replace it. The deadline for making this transition has however been repeatedly changed, and Cyrillic is still more common. It is not clear that the transition will be made at all.

The Uzbek Cyrillic alphabet
А а	Б б	В в	Г г	Д д	Е е	Ё ё	Ж ж	З з	И и	Й й	К к
Л л	М м	Н н	О о	П п	Р р	С с	Т т	У у	Ф ф	Х х	Ц ц
Ч ч	Ш ш	Ъ ъ	Ь ь	Э э	Ю ю	Я я	Ў ў	Қ қ	Ғ ғ	Ҳ ҳ

- В в = /w/
- Ж ж = /dʒ/
- Ф ф = /ɸ/
- Х х = /χ/
- Ъ ъ = /ʔ/
- Ў ў = /ө/
- Қ қ = /q/
- Ғ ғ = /ʁ/
- Ҳ ҳ = /h/

In addition to the letters from the Russian alphabet, А–Я, except for Щ and Ы, the Uzbek Cyrillic alphabet includes Ў, Қ, Ғ and Ҳ at the end. They are distinct letters in the Uzbek Cyrillic alphabet and are sorted after Я as shown above.

=== Yakut ===
Several Cyrillic alphabets have been used to write Yakut, but the current alphabet was adopted in 1939.

The Yakut Cyrillic alphabet
А а	Б б	**В в**	Г г	Ҕ ҕ	Д д	Дь дь	**Е е**	**Ё ё**
**Ж ж**	**З з**	И и	Й й	К к	Л л	М м	Н н	Ҥ ҥ
Нь нь	О о	Ө ө	П п	Р р	С с	Һ һ	Т т	У у
Ү ү	**Ф ф**	Х х	**Ц ц**	Ч ч	**Ш ш**	**Щ щ**	**Ъ ъ**	Ы ы
**Ь ь**	Э э	**Ю ю**	**Я я**

Letters in Bold are only used in Russian Loanwords.

=== Other ===
- Altai
- Crimean Tatar (1938–1991, now mostly replaced by Roman)
- Gagauz (1957–1990s, exclusively in Cyrillic, since 1990s officially in Roman, but in reality in everyday communication Cyrillic is used along with Roman script)
- Karachay-Balkar
- Karakalpak (1940s–1990s)
- Karaim (20th century)
- Khakas
- Kumyk
- Nogai
- Tuvan
- Uyghur – Uyghur Cyrillic alphabet (Uyghur Siril Yëziqi). Used along with Uyghur Arabic alphabet (Uyghur Ereb Yëziqi), New Script (Uyghur Yëngi Yëziqi, Pinyin-based), and modern Uyghur Latin alphabet (Uyghur Latin Yëziqi).
- Dolgan
- Balkan Gagauz Turkish
- Urum
- Siberian Tatar
- Siberian Turkic

== Caucasian languages ==
=== Northwest Caucasian languages ===
Living Northwest Caucasian languages are generally written using Cyrillic alphabets.

==== Abaza ====
Abaza is a Caucasian language, spoken by Abazins in the Karachay-Cherkessia Republic, Russia.

The Abaza Cyrillic alphabet
А а	Б б	В в	Г г	Гв гв	Гъ гъ	Гъв гъв	Гъь гъь	Гь гь
Гӏ гӏ	Гӏв гӏв	Д д	Дж дж	Джв джв	Джь джь	Дз дз	Е е	Ё ё
Ж ж	Жв жв	Жь жь	З з	И и	Й й	К к	Кв кв	Къ къ
Къв къв	Къь къь	Кь кь	Кӏ кӏ	Кӏв кӏв	Кӏь кӏь	Л л	Ль ль	(Лӏ лӏ)
М м	Н н	О о	П п	Пӏ пӏ	Р р	С с	Т т	Тл тл
Тш тш	Тӏ тӏ	У у	Ф ф	(Фӏ фӏ)	Х х	Хв хв	Хъ хъ	Хъв хъв
Хь хь	Хӏ хӏ	Хӏв хӏв	Ц ц	Цӏ цӏ	Ч ч	Чв чв	Чӏ чӏ	Чӏв чӏв
Ш ш	Шв шв	Шӏ шӏ	Щ щ	Ъ ъ	Ы ы	Э э	Ю ю	Я я

- Digraphs in parentheses are dialectal, and are therefore absent from the literary language and the official alphabet.

==== Abkhaz ====
Abkhaz is a Caucasian language, spoken in the Autonomous Republic of Abkhazia, Georgia.

The Abkhaz Cyrillic alphabet
А а	Б б	В в	Г г	Гь гь	Гә гә	Ӷ ӷ	Ӷь ӷь
Ӷә ӷә	Д д	Дә дә	Е е	Ж ж	Жь жь	Жә жә	З з
Ӡ ӡ	Ӡә ӡә	И и	К к	Кь кь	Кә кә	Қ қ	Қь қь
Қә қә	Ҟ ҟ	Ҟь ҟь	Ҟә ҟә	Л л	М м	Н н	О о
П п	Ԥ ԥ	Р р	С с	Т т	Тә тә	Ҭ ҭ	Ҭә ҭә
У у	Ф ф	Х х	Хь хь	Хә хә	Ҳ ҳ	Ҳә ҳә	Ц ц
Цә цә	Ҵ ҵ	Ҵә ҵә	Ч ч	Ҷ ҷ	Ҽ ҽ	Ҿ ҿ	Ш ш
Шь шь	Шә шә	Ы ы	Ҩ ҩ	Џ џ	Џь џь	Ь ь	Ә ә

- For older conventions, see Abkhaz alphabet.

==== Adyghe ====
Adyghe is a Caucasian language, spoken in the Republic of Adygea, Russia.

The Adyghe Cyrillic alphabet
А а	Б б	В в	Г г	Гу гу	Гъ гъ	Гъу гъу	Д д	Дж дж	Дз дз	Дзу дзу
Е е	Ё ё	Ж ж	Жъ жъ	Жъу жъу	Жь жь	З з	И и	Й й	К к	Ку ку
Къ къ	Къу къу	Кӏ кӏ	Кӏу кӏу	Л л	Лъ лъ	Лӏ лӏ	М м	Н н	О о	П п
Пӏ пӏ	Пӏу пӏу	Р р	С с	Т т	Тӏ тӏ	Тӏу тӏу	У у	Ф ф	Х х	Хъ хъ
Хъу хъу	Хь хь	Ц ц	Цу цу	Цӏ цӏ	Ч ч	Чъ чъ	Чӏ чӏ	Ш ш	Шъ шъ	Шъу шъу
Шӏ шӏ	Шӏу шӏу	Щ щ	(Ъ ъ)	Ы ы	(Ь ь)	Э э	Ю ю	Я я	Ӏ ӏ	Ӏу ӏу

- Letters in parentheses are only used in digraphs.

==== Kabardian ====
Kabardian is a Caucasian language, spoken in the Republics of Kabardino-Balkaria and Karachay-Cherkessia, Russia.

The Kabardian Cyrillic alphabet
А а	Б б	В в	Г г	Гу гу	Гъ гъ	Гъу гъу	Д д	Дж дж	Дз дз
Е е	Ё ё	Ж ж	Жь жь	З з	И и	Й й	К к	Ку ку	Кӏ кӏ
Кӏу кӏу	Къ къ	Къу къу	Кхъ кхъ	Кхъу кхъу	Л л	Лъ лъ	Лӏ лӏ	М м	Н н
О о	П п	Пӏ пӏ	Р р	С с	Т т	Тӏ тӏ	У у	Ф ф	Фӏ фӏ
Х х	Ху ху	Хъ хъ	Хъу хъу	Хь хь	Ц ц	Цӏ цӏ	Ч ч	Ш ш	Щ щ
Щӏ щӏ	Ъ ъ	Ы ы	Ь ь	Э э	Ю ю	Я я	Ӏ ӏ	Ӏу ӏу

=== Northeast Caucasian languages ===
Northeast Caucasian languages are generally written using Cyrillic alphabets.

==== Avar ====
Avar is a Caucasian language, spoken in the Republic of Dagestan, of the Russian Federation, where it is co-official together with other Caucasian languages like Dargwa, Lak, Lezgian and Tabassaran. All these alphabets, and other ones (Abaza, Adyghe, Chechen, Ingush, Kabardian) have an extra sign: palochka (Ӏ), which gives voiceless occlusive consonants its particular ejective sound.

The Avar Cyrillic alphabet
А а	Б б	В в	Г г	Гъ гъ	Гь гь	Гӏ гӏ	Д д
Е е	Ё ё	Ж ж	З з	И и	Й й	К к	Къ къ
Кь кь	Кӏ кӏ	Кӏкӏ кӏкӏ	Кк кк	Л л	М м	Н н	О о
П п	Р р	С с	Т т	Тӏ тӏ	У у	Ф ф	Х х
Хх хх	Хъ хъ	Хь хь	Хӏ хӏ	Ц ц	Цц цц	Цӏ цӏ	Цӏцӏ цӏцӏ
Ч ч	Чӏ чӏ	Чӏчӏ чӏчӏ	Ш ш	Щ щ	Ъ ъ	Ы ы	Ь ь
Э э	Ю ю	Я я	Ӏ

- В = /w/
- гъ = /ʁ/
- гь = /h/
- гӀ = /ʕ/
- къ = /qːʼ/
- кӀ = /kʼ/
- кь = /t͡ɬːʼ/
- кӀкӀ = /t͡ɬː/, is also written ЛӀ лӀ.
- кк = /ɬ/, is also written Лъ лъ.
- тӀ = /tʼ/
- х = /χ/
- хъ = /qː/
- хь = /x/
- хӀ = /ħ/
- цӀ = /t͡sʼ/
- чӀ = /t͡ʃʼ/
- Double consonants, called "fortis", are pronounced longer than single consonants (called "lenis").

==== Lezgian ====
Lezgian is spoken by the Lezgins, who live in southern Dagestan and northern Azerbaijan. Lezgian is a literary language and an official language of Dagestan.

==== Other ====
- Chechen (since 1938, also with Roman 1991–2000, but switch back to Cyrillic alphabets since 2001.)
- Dargwa
- Lak
- Tabassaran
- Ingush
- Archi

== Mongolian ==
The Mongolic languages include Khalkha (in Mongolia; Cyrillic is official since 1941, in practice from 1946), Buryat (around Lake Baikal; Cyrillic is used since the 1930s) and Kalmyk (northwest of the Caspian Sea; Cyrillic is used in various forms since the 1920-30s). Khalkha Mongolian is also written with the Mongol vertical alphabet, which was the official script before 1941. Since the beginning of the 1990s Mongolia has been making attempts to extend the rather limited use of Mongol script and the most recent National Plan for Mongol Script aims to bring its use to the same level as Cyrillic by 2025 and maintain a dual-script system (digraphia).

=== Overview ===
This table contains all the characters used.

Һһ is shown twice as it appears at two different locations in Buryat and Kalmyk

Mongolian Cyrillic alphabets
Khalkha	Аа		Бб	Вв	Гг		Дд	Ее	Ёё	Жж		Зз	Ии	Йй	Кк	Лл	Мм	Нн		Оо
Buryat	Аа		Бб	Вв	Гг		Дд	Ее	Ёё	Жж		Зз	Ии	Йй	Кк	Лл	Мм	Нн		Оо
Kalmyk	Аа	Әә	Бб	Вв	Гг	Һһ	Дд	Ее	Ёё	Жж	Җҗ	Зз	Ии	Йй	Кк	Лл	Мм	Нн	Ңң	Оо
Khalkha	Өө	Пп	Рр	Сс	Тт	Уу	Үү	Фф	Хх		Цц	Чч	Шш	Щщ	Ъъ	Ыы	Ьь	Ээ	Юю	Яя
Buryat	Өө	Пп	Рр	Сс	Тт	Уу	Үү	Фф	Хх	Һһ	Цц	Чч	Шш	Щщ	Ъъ	Ыы	Ьь	Ээ	Юю	Яя
Kalmyk	Өө	Пп	Рр	Сс	Тт	Уу	Үү	Фф	Хх		Цц	Чч	Шш	Щщ	Ъъ	ЫЫ	Ьь	Ээ	Юю	Яя

=== Khalkha ===
The Khalkha Mongolian Cyrillic alphabet
А а	Б б	В в	Г г	Д д	Е е	Ё ё	Ж ж	З з	И и	Й й	К к
Л л	М м	Н н	О о	Ө ө	П п	Р р	С с	Т т	У у	Ү ү	Ф ф
Х х	Ц ц	Ч ч	Ш ш	Щ щ	Ъ ъ	Ы ы	Ь ь	Э э	Ю ю	Я я

- В в = /w/
- Е е = /jɛ/, /jœ/
- Ё ё = /jo/
- Ж ж = /dʒ/
- З з = /dz/
- Ий ий = /iː/
- Й й = the second element of closing diphthongs (ай, ой, etc.) and long /iː/ (ий), it never indicates /j/ in native words
- Н н = /n-/, /-ŋ/
- Ө ө = /œ/
- У у = /ʊ/
- Ү ү = /u/
- Ы ы = /iː/ (in suffixes after a hard consonant)
- Ь ь = palatalization of the preceding consonant
- Ю ю = /ju/, /jy/

Long vowels are indicated with double letters. The Cyrillic letters Кк, Пп, Фф and Щщ are not used in native Mongolian words, but only for Russian or other loans (Пп may occur in native onomatopoeic words).

=== Buryat ===
The Buryat (буряад) Cyrillic script is similar to the Khalkha above, but Ьь indicates palatalization as in Russian. Buryat does not use Вв, Кк, Пп, Фф, Цц, Чч, Щщ or Ъъ in its native words (Пп may occur in native onomatopoeic words).

The Buryat Mongolian Cyrillic alphabet
А а	Б б	В в	Г г	Д д	Е е	Ё ё	Ж ж	З з	И и	Й й	К к
Л л	М м	Н н	О о	Ө ө	П п	Р р	С с	Т т	У у	Ү ү	Ф ф
Х х	Һ һ	Ц ц	Ч ч	Ш ш	Щ щ	Ъ ъ	Ы ы	Ь ь	Э э	Ю ю	Я я

- Е е = /jɛ/, /jœ/
- Ё ё = /jo/
- Ж ж = /dʒ/
- Й й = the second element of closing diphthongs (ай, ой, etc.), it never indicates /j/ in native words
- Н н = /n-/, /-ŋ/
- Өө өө = /œː/, ө does not occur in short form in literary Buryat based on the Khori dialect
- У у = /ʊ/
- Ү ү = /u/
- Һ һ = /h/
- Ы ы = /ei/, /iː/
- Ю ю = /ju/

=== Kalmyk ===
The Kalmyk (хальмг) Cyrillic script differs from Khalkha in some respects: there are additional letters (Әә, Җҗ, Ңң, Һһ), letters Ээ, Юю and Яя appear only word-initially, long vowels are written double in the first syllable (нөөрин), but single in syllables after the first. Short vowels are omitted altogether in syllables after the first syllable (хальмг = /xaʎmaɡ/). Жж and Пп are used in loanwords only (Russian, Tibetan, etc.), but Пп may occur in native onomatopoeic words.

The Kalmyk Mongolian Cyrillic alphabet
А а	Ә ә	Б б	В в	Г г	Һ һ	Д д	Е е	Ж ж	Җ җ	З з	И и
Й й	К к	Л л	М м	Н н	Ң ң	О о	Ө ө	П п	Р р	С с	Т т
У у	Ү ү	Х х	Ц ц	Ч ч	Ш ш	Ь ь	Э э	Ю ю	Я я

- Ә ә = /æ/
- В в = /w/
- Һ һ = /ɣ/
- Е е = /ɛ/, /jɛ-/
- Җ җ = /dʒ/
- Ң ң = /ŋ/
- Ө ө = /ø/
- У у = /ʊ/
- Ү ү = /u/

== Sino-Tibetan ==
=== Dungan language ===
Since 1953.

The modern Dungan Cyrillic alphabet
А а	Б б	В в	Г г	Д д	Е е	Ё ё	Ә ә	Ж ж	Җ җ	З з	И и
Й й	К к	Л л	М м	Н н	Ң ң	О о	П п	Р р	С с	Т т	У у
Ў ў	Ү ү	Ф ф	Х х	Ц ц	Ч ч	Ш ш	Щ щ	Ъ ъ	Ы ы	Ь ь	Э э
Ю ю	Я я

- Letters in **bold** are used only in Russian loanwords.

== Tungusic languages ==
- Even
- Evenk (since 1937)
- Nanai
- Udege (Udihe) (since late 1980s)
- Orok (since 2007)
- Ulch (since late 1980s)

== Chukotko-Kamchatkan languages ==
=== Chukchi language ===
Since 1936.

The Chukchi Cyrillic alphabet
А а	Б б	В в	Г г	Д д	Е е	Ё ё	Ж ж	З з	И и	Й й	К к
Ӄ ӄ	Л л	Ԓ ԓ	М м	Н н	Ӈ ӈ	О о	П п	Р р	С с	Т т	У у
Ф ф	Х х	Ц ц	Ч ч	Ш ш	Щ щ	Ъ ъ	Ы ы	Ь ь	Э э	Ю ю	Я я
ʼ

=== Koryak language ===
Since 1936.

The Koryak Cyrillic alphabet
А а	Б б	В в	Вʼ вʼ	Г г	Гʼ гʼ	Д д	Е е	Ё ё	Ж ж	З з	И и
Й й	К к	Ӄ ӄ	Л л	М м	Н н	Ӈ ӈ	О о	П п	Р р	С с	Т т
У у	Ф ф	Х х	Ц ц	Ч ч	Ш ш	Щ щ	Ъ ъ	Ы ы	Ь ь	Э э	Ю ю
Я я

=== Itelmen language ===
Since late 1980s.

The Itelmen Cyrillic alphabet
А а	Ӑ ӑ	Б б	В в	Г г	Д д	Е е	Ё ё	Ж ж	З з	И и	Й й
К к	Кʼ кʼ	Ӄ ӄ	Ӄʼ ӄʼ	Л л	Љ љ	Ԓ ԓ	М м	Н н	Њ њ	Ӈ ӈ	О о
О̆ о̆	П п	Пʼ пʼ	Р р	С с	Т т	Тʼ тʼ	У у	Ў ў	Ф ф	Х х	Ӽ ӽ
Ц ц	Ч ч	Чʼ чʼ	Ш ш	Щ щ	Ъ ъ	Ы ы	Ь ь	Ә ә	Э э	Ю ю	Я я

=== Alyutor language ===
The Alyutor Cyrillic alphabet
А а	Б б	В в	Вʼ вʼ	Г г	Гʼ гʼ	Ғ ғ	Д д	Е е	Ә ә	Ё ё	Ж ж
З з	И и	Й й	К к	Ӄ ӄ	Л л	М м	Н н	Ӈ ӈ	О о	П п	Р р
С с	Т т	У у	Ф ф	Х х	Ц ц	Ч ч	Ш ш	Щ щ	Ъ ъ	Ы ы	Ь ь
Э э	Ю ю	Я я

== Eskaleut languages ==
=== Aleut language ===
The Aleut Cyrillic alphabet (Bering dialect)
А а	А̄ а̄	Б б	В в	Г г	Ӷ ӷ	Гў гў	Д д
Д̆ д̆	Е е	Е̄ е̄	Ё ё	Ж ж	З з	И и	Ӣ ӣ
Й й	ʼЙ ʼй	К к	Ӄ ӄ	Л л	ʼЛ ʼл	М м	ʼМ ʼм
Н н	ʼН ʼн	Ӈ ӈ	ʼӇ ʼӈ	О о	О̄ о̄	П п	Р р
С с	Т т	У у	Ӯ ӯ	Ў ў	Ф ф	Х х	Ӽ ӽ
Ц ц	Ч ч	Ш ш	Щ щ	Ъ ъ	Ы ы	Ы̄ ы̄	Ь ь
Э э	Э̄ э̄	Ю ю	Ю̄ ю̄	Я я	Я̄ я̄	ʼ	’Ў ’ў

=== Central Siberian Yupik language ===
==== Chaplino dialect ====
The Central Siberian Yupik Cyrillic alphabet (Chaplino dialect)
А а	Б б	В в	Г г	Ӷ ӷ	Д д	Е е	Ё ё
Ж ж	З з	И и	Й й	К к	Ӄ ӄ	Л л	Лъ лъ
М м	Н н	Нъ нъ	Ӈ ӈ	О о	П п	Р р	С с
Т т	У у	Ў ў	Ф ф	Х х	Ӽ ӽ	Ц ц	Ч ч
Ш ш	Щ щ	Ъ ъ	Ы ы	Ь ь	Э э	Ю ю	Я я

The letters Ӷ ӷ, Ӄ ӄ, Ӈ ӈ, Ӽ ӽ are sometimes replaced by Гʼ гʼ, Кʼ кʼ, Нʼ нʼ, Хʼ хʼ or Ґ ґ, Қ қ, Ң ң, Ҳ ҳ.

=== Sirenik language ===
The Sirenik Cyrillic alphabet
А а	А̄ а̄	**Б б**	В в	Ԝ ԝ	Г г	Ӷ ӷ	**Д д**
**Е е**	**Ё ё**	**Ж ж**	**З з**	И и	Ӣ ӣ	Й й	Йь йь
К к	Ӄ ӄ	Л л	Лъ лъ	М м	Н н	Нъ нъ	Ӈ ӈ
**О о**	П п	Р р	С с	Т т	У у	Ӯ ӯ	**Ф ф**
Х х	Ӽ ӽ	Ц ц	**Ч ч**	**Ш ш**	**Щ щ**	Ъ ъ	Ы ы
**Ь ь**	**Э э**	Ю ю	Ю̄ ю̄	Я я	Я̄ я̄

- Letters in **bold** are used only in Russian loanwords.

=== Other ===
- Naukan Yupik

== Other languages ==
- Ainu (in Russia)
- Assyrian Neo-Aramaic (Aisor)
- Ket (since 1980s)
- Nivkh
- Tlingit (in Russian Alaska)
- Yukaghirs (Tundra Yukaghir, Forest Yukaghir)

== Constructed languages ==
=== International auxiliary languages ===
- Interslavic
- Lingua Franca Nova

=== Fictional languages ===
- Brutopian (Donald Duck stories)
- Syldavian (The Adventures of Tintin)

== Summary table ==
Cyrillic Letters:

Cyrillic alphabets comparison table
Early scripts
Church Slavonic	А		Б	В	Г		Д		(Ѕ)	Е			Ж		Ѕ/З			И	І				К			Л		М		Н			О			П	(Ҁ)	Р		С		Т		Оу			Ф	Х	(Ѡ)	Ц		Ч				Ш	Щ	Ъ	Ы		Ь	Ѣ				Ю		Ꙗ	Ѥ	Ѧ	Ѩ	Ѫ	Ѭ	Ѯ	Ѱ	Ѳ	Ѵ	Ҁ
Most common shared letters
Common	А		Б	В	Г		Д			Е			Ж		З			И				Й	К			Л		М		Н			О			П		Р		С		Т		У			Ф	Х		Ц		Ч				Ш	Щ				Ь					Ю		Я										
South Slavic languages
Bulgarian	А		Б	В	Г		Д	Дж	Дз	Е			Ж		З			И				Й	К			Л		М		Н			О			П		Р		С		Т		У			Ф	Х		Ц		Ч				Ш	Щ	Ъ			Ь					Ю		Я										
Serbian	А		Б	В	Г		Д	Ђ		Е			Ж		З			И		Ј			К			Л	Љ	М		Н	Њ		О			П		Р		С		Т	Ћ	У			Ф	Х		Ц		Ч	Џ			Ш																						
Montenegrin	А		Б	В	Г		Д	Ђ		Е			Ж		З	З́		И		Ј			К			Л	Љ	М		Н	Њ		О			П		Р		С	С́	Т	Ћ	У			Ф	Х		Ц		Ч	Џ			Ш																						
Macedonian	А		Б	В	Г		Д	Ѓ		Е			Ж		З		Ѕ	И		Ј			К			Л	Љ	М		Н	Њ		О			П		Р		С		Т	Ќ	У			Ф	Х		Ц		Ч	Џ			Ш																						
East Slavic languages
Russian	А		Б	В	Г		Д			Е		Ё	Ж		З			И				Й	К			Л		М		Н			О			П		Р		С		Т		У			Ф	Х		Ц		Ч				Ш	Щ	Ъ	Ы		Ь		Э			Ю		Я										
Belarusian	А		Б	В	Г	Ґ	Д			Е		Ё	Ж		З				І			Й	К			Л		М		Н			О			П		Р		С		Т		У	Ў		Ф	Х		Ц		Ч				Ш		’	Ы		Ь		Э			Ю		Я										
Ukrainian	А		Б	В	Г	Ґ	Д			Е	Є		Ж		З			И	І		Ї	Й	К			Л		М		Н			О			П		Р		С		Т		У			Ф	Х		Ц		Ч				Ш	Щ	’			Ь					Ю		Я										
Rusyn	А		Б	В	Г	Ґ	Д			Е	Є	Ё	Ж		З	І	Ї	И		Ы		Й	К			Л		М		Н			О			П		Р		С		Т		У			Ф	Х		Ц		Ч				Ш	Щ	Ъ			Ь	Ѣ				Ю		Я										
Iranian languages
Kurdish	А		Б	В	Г	Г'	Д			Е	Ә	Ә'	Ж		З			И				Й	К	К'		Л		М		Н			О	Ö		П	П'	Р	Р'	С		Т	Т'	У			Ф	Х	Һ	Һ'		Ч	Ч'			Ш	Щ				Ь		Э	Ԛ	Ԝ													
Ossetian	А	Ӕ	Б	В	Г	Гъ	Д	Дж	Дз	Е		Ё	Ж		З			И				Й	К	Къ		Л		М		Н			О			П	Пъ	Р		С		Т	Тъ	У			Ф	Х	Хъ	Ц	Цъ	Ч	Чъ			Ш	Щ	Ъ	Ы		Ь		Э			Ю		Я										
Tajik	А		Б	В	Г	Ғ	Д			Е		Ё	Ж		З			И		Ӣ		Й	К	Қ		Л		М		Н			О			П		Р		С		Т		У	Ӯ		Ф	Х	Ҳ			Ч	Ҷ			Ш		Ъ					Э			Ю		Я										
Romance languages
Moldovan	А		Б	В	Г		Д			Е			Ж	Ӂ	З			И				Й	К			Л		М		Н			О			П		Р		С		Т		У			Ф	Х		Ц		Ч				Ш			Ы		Ь		Э			Ю		Я										
Romanian	А		Б	В	Г		Д	Џ	Ѕ	Е			Ж		З			И	І	І̆	Ї	Й	К			Л		М		Н			Ѻ	Ѡ	Ѡ̆	П		Р		С		Т		ꙋ	ꙋ꙼		Ф	Х		Ц		Ч				Ш	Щ	Ъ	Ы		Ь	Ѣ				Ю	Ю̆	Ꙗ	Ѥ	Ѧ		Ѫ		Ѯ	Ѱ	Ѳ	Ѵ	
Uralic languages
Komi-Permyak	А		Б	В	Г		Д			Е		Ё	Ж		З			И	І			Й	К			Л		М		Н			О	Ӧ		П		Р		С		Т		У			Ф	Х		Ц		Ч				Ш	Щ	Ъ	Ы		Ь		Э			Ю		Я										
Meadow Mari	А		Б	В	Г		Д			Е		Ё	Ж		З			И				Й	К			Л		М		Н	Ҥ		О	Ӧ		П		Р		С		Т		У	Ӱ		Ф	Х		Ц		Ч				Ш	Щ	Ъ	Ы		Ь		Э			Ю		Я										
Hill Mari	А	Ӓ	Б	В	Г		Д			Е		Ё	Ж		З			И				Й	К			Л		М		Н			О	Ӧ		П		Р		С		Т		У	Ӱ		Ф	Х		Ц		Ч				Ш	Щ	Ъ	Ы		Ь	Ӹ	Э			Ю		Я										
Kildin Sami	А	Ӓ	Б	В	Г		Д			Е		Ё	Ж		З			И		Й	Ҋ	Ј	К			Л	Ӆ	М	Ӎ	Н	Ӊ	Ӈ	О			П		Р	Ҏ	С		Т		У			Ф	Х	Һ	Ц		Ч				Ш	Щ	Ъ	Ы	Ҍ	Ь		Э	Ӭ		Ю		Я										
Turkic languages
Azerbaijani	А		Б	В	Г	Ғ	Д			Е	Ә	Ё	Ж		З		Ы	И	Ј			Й	К	Ҝ		Л		М		Н			О	Ө		П		Р		С		Т		У		Ү	Ф	Х	Һ	Ц		Ч	Ҹ			Ш	Щ	Ъ	Ы		Ь		Э			Ю		Я										
Bashkir	А	Ә	Б	В	Г	Ғ	Д		Ҙ	Е		Ё	Ж		З			И				Й	К	Ҡ		Л		М		Н	Ң		О	Ө		П		Р		С	Ҫ	Т		У		Ү	Ф	Х	Һ	Ц		Ч				Ш	Щ	Ъ	Ы		Ь		Э	Ә		Ю		Я										
Chuvash	А	Ӑ	Б	В	Г		Д			Е	Ё	Ӗ	Ж		З			И				Й	К			Л		М		Н			О			П		Р		С	Ҫ	Т		У	Ӳ		Ф	Х		Ц		Ч				Ш	Щ	Ъ	Ы		Ь		Э			Ю		Я										
Kazakh	А	Ә	Б	В	Г	Ғ	Д			Е		Ё	Ж		З			И	І			Й	К	Қ		Л		М		Н	Ң		О	Ө		П		Р		С		Т		У	Ұ	Ү	Ф	Х	Һ	Ц		Ч				Ш	Щ	Ъ	Ы		Ь		Э			Ю		Я										
Kyrgyz	А		Б	В	Г		Д			Е		Ё	Ж		З			И				Й	К			Л		М		Н	Ң		О	Ө		П		Р		С		Т		У		Ү	Ф	Х		Ц		Ч				Ш	Щ	Ъ	Ы		Ь		Э			Ю		Я										
Tatar	А	Ә	Б	В	Г		Д			Е		Ё	Ж	Җ	З			И				Й	К			Л		М		Н	Ң		О	Ө		П		Р		С		Т		У		Ү	Ф	Х	Һ	Ц		Ч				Ш	Щ	Ъ	Ы		Ь		Э			Ю		Я										
Uzbek	А		Б	В	Г	Ғ	Д			Е		Ё	Ж		З			И				Й	К	Қ		Л		М		Н			О			П		Р		С		Т		У	Ў		Ф	Х	Ҳ			Ч				Ш		Ъ					Э			Ю		Я										
Caucasian languages
Abkhaz	А		Б	В	Г Ӷь Ӷә	Ӷ(Ҕ) Ӷь(Ҕь) Ӷә(Ҕә)	Д	Дә		Е			Ж Жь Жә		З		Ӡ Ӡә	И					К Кь Кә	Қ(Ӄ) Қь(Ӄь) Қә(Ӄә)	Ҟ Ҟь Ҟә	Л		М		Н			О			П	Ԥ(Ҧ)	Р		С		Т Тә	Ҭ Ҭә	У			Ф	Х Хь Хә	Ҳ Ҳә	Ц Цә	Ҵ Ҵә	Ч	Ҷ	Ҽ	Ҿ	Ш Шь Шә			Ы					Ҩ	Џ Џь													
Mongolian languages
Khalkha	А		Б	В	Г		Д			Е		Ё	Ж		З			И				Й	К			Л		М		Н			О	Ө		П		Р		С		Т		У		Ү	Ф	Х		Ц		Ч				Ш	Щ	Ъ	Ы		Ь		Э			Ю		Я										
Buryat	А		Б	В	Г		Д			Е		Ё	Ж		З			И				Й	К			Л		М		Н			О	Ө		П		Р		С		Т		У		Ү	Ф	Х	Һ	Ц		Ч				Ш	Щ	Ъ	Ы		Ь		Э			Ю		Я										
Kalmyk	А	Ә	Б	В	Г	Һ	Д			Е			Ж	Җ	З			И				Й	К			Л		М		Н	Ң		О	Ө		П		Р		С		Т		У		Ү	Ф	Х		Ц		Ч				Ш					Ь		Э			Ю		Я										
Sino-Tibetan languages
Dungan	А		Б	В	Г		Д			Е		Ё	Ж	Җ	З			И				Й	К			Л		М		Н	Ң	Ә	О			П		Р		С		Т		У	Ў	Ү	Ф	Х		Ц		Ч				Ш	Щ	Ъ	Ы		Ь		Э			Ю		Я										
Total Use	29	8	29	29	29	12	29	6	3	29								28																																																												

== See also ==
- List of Cyrillic letters
- Cyrillic script
- Cyrillic script in Unicode
- Old Church Slavonic
