= Qa (Cyrillic) =

Cyrillic letter used for /q/ in Kurdish

- Ԛ ԛ

Usage
- Writing system: Cyrillic
- Type: Alphabetic
- Sound values: [q], formerly also [qʼ]

History
Development
O34
      - Ϙ ϙ
        - 𐌒
          - Q q
            - Ԛ ԛ

Qa (Ԛ ԛ; italics: Ԛ ԛ) is a letter of the Cyrillic script. Its form is based on the Latin letter Q (Q q). The lowercase form can look like a reversed Cyrillic letter Р, and the uppercase as well depending on font.

Qa is used in the Cyrillic alphabet of the Kurdish language, where it represents the voiceless uvular plosive /q/. It was also used to represent /q’/, the uvular ejective stop (now represented by Ҟ ҟ), in the Translation Committee's Abkhaz alphabet, published around the turn of the 20th century, and to represent /q/ in three old Ossetian alphabets (now represented by Хъ хъ).

This character appeared in newspapers and articles such as 1955's Кӧрдо or Kurdo.

In the 1930s, Qa was used in the Cyrillic script for the Assyrian language (Suret) in the USSR and represented the voiceless velar plosive.

The letter was also used in the scrapped version of the Azerbaijani alphabet. It was, however, eliminated and replaced by Ҝ in Dagestan.

== Computing codes ==
Character information
Preview	Ԛ		ԛ	
Unicode name	CYRILLIC CAPITAL LETTER QA		CYRILLIC SMALL LETTER QA	
Encodings	decimal	hex	dec	hex
Unicode	1306	U+051A	1307	U+051B
UTF-8	212 154	D4 9A	212 155	D4 9B
Numeric character reference	&#1306;	&#x51A;	&#1307;	&#x51B;

== See also ==
- Ҁ ҁ : Cyrillic letter Koppa, an obsolete Early Cyrillic letter with the same graphical origin
- Other Cyrillic letters used to write the sound /q/:
  - Қ қ : Cyrillic letter Ka with descender
  - Ӄ ӄ : Cyrillic letter Ka with hook
  - Ҡ ҡ : Cyrillic letter Bashkir Qa
  - Ԟ ԟ : Cyrillic letter Aleut Ka
- Cyrillic characters in Unicode
