= Ka with hook =

Cyrillic letter used for /q/ in various languages

- Ӄ ӄ

Usage
- Writing system: Cyrillic
- Type: Alphabetic
- Language of origin: Aleut, Alyutor, Chukchi, Itelmen, Ket, Koryak, Nivkh, Selkup, Tofalar, Yupik
- In Unicode: U+04C3

Ka with hook (Ӄ ӄ; italics: Ӄ ӄ) is a letter of the Cyrillic script. It is formed from the Cyrillic letter Ka (К к) by the addition of a hook.

Ka with hook is widely used in the alphabets of Siberia and the Russian Far East: Chukchi, Koryak, Alyutor, Itelmen, Yupik, Aleut, Nivkh, Ket, Tofalar and Selkup, where it represents the voiceless uvular plosive /q/. It has been sometimes used in the Khanty language as a substitute for Cyrillic letter Ka with descender, Қ қ, which also stands for /q/.

It was also used to represent /kʰ/, the aspirated voiceless velar plosive, in the Translation Committee's Abkhaz alphabet, which was published around the turn of the 20th century, and to represent /kʼ/, the velar ejective stop, in two old Ossetian alphabets, Anders Johan Sjögren's 1844 alphabet and the Teachers' Congress's 1917 alphabet.

== Computing codes ==
Character information
| Preview | Ӄ | | ӄ | |
|---|---|---|---|---|
| Unicode name | CYRILLIC CAPITAL LETTER; KA WITH HOOK | | CYRILLIC SMALL LETTER; KA WITH HOOK | |
| Encodings | decimal | hex | dec | hex |
| Unicode | 1219 | U+04C3 | 1220 | U+04C4 |
| UTF-8 | 211 131 | D3 83 | 211 132 | D3 84 |
| Numeric character reference | &#1219; | &#x4C3; | &#1220; | &#x4C4; |

== See also ==
Other Cyrillic letters used to write the sound /q/:

- Ҡ ҡ : Cyrillic letter Bashkir Qa
- Ԟ ԟ : Cyrillic letter Aleut Ka
- Ԛ ԛ : Cyrillic letter Qa
- Cyrillic characters in Unicode
