= Michael Branch (academic) =

British linguist and academic administrator (1940–2019)

- Born: 24 March 1940; Shrewsbury, England
- Died: 17 June 2019 (aged 79); London, England
- Education: School of Slavonic and East European Studies
- Scientific career
- Fields: Linguistics

Michael Arthur Branch, CMG (24 March 1940, Shrewsbury, England — 17 June 2019, Langley, Kent, England) was a British linguist and academic administrator.

== Studies ==
Branch studied Hungarian, Swedish and Finnish at the School of Slavonic and East European Studies, University of London, and completed his Bachelor of Arts (BA) degree, and then spent four years in Helsinki doing research, after which completed his doctorate (PhD, 1967) at the School of Slavonic and East European Studies. He wrote his dissertation on Anders Johan Sjögren, entitled A. J. Sjögren — Studies of the North, which was published in Finland by the Finno-Ugrian Society in 1973. He showed that Sjögren’s work created perspectives into the formation of the Finnish identity and that Sjögren opened up a path that Elias Lönnrot then would follow.

In a way, Branch in his own life replicated that of Sjögren: Sjögren was a son of poor shoemaker, who rose to become a permanent member of the St. Petersburg Academy of Sciences, and Branch was a fireman’s son from East London, who rose to a respectable position within the academia.

== Academic career ==
Branch joined the staff at the School of Slavonic and East European Studies as a lecturer after completing his doctorate and became a Reader in Finnish in 1977. He became the School's Director in 1980, serving until 2001, and was also a Professor of Finnish at the University of London from 1986 until that time.

== Work to promote Finnish culture in the West ==
Together with Finnish scholars, Branch worked on an anthology of Finnish narrative poetry of the Kalevala type, which was entitled Finnish Folk Poetry. Epic (1977), and a book about Finno-Ugric folk poetry entitled The Great Bear (1983). Both works were translated by poet Keith Bosley, who was Branch’s choice for the work.

Branch also worked to develop the magazine Books from Finland, which presents Finnish literature and scholarship in the field of the humanities in English.

In Finland, Branch together with local people in Iitti founded a society called A. J. Sjögren Society and organized two conferences on Sjögren in Iitti.

Branch worked on Sjögren’s travel letters for a publication, a project which was left incomplete at his death, but his other project, the publication of Sjögren’s travel journals, on which he worked together with former Finnish National Library head Esko Häkli and linguist Marja Leinonen, was completed in 2020.

In the 2010s, Branch was suffering from an illness which seriously affected his memory.

== Honours ==
In 2000, Branch was appointed a Companion of the Order of St Michael and St George (CMG). He was also a Commander of the Finnish Order of the Lion (1980), the Polish Order of Merit (1992) and the Estonian Order of the Cross of Terra Mariana (2000); he was an Officer of the Order of the Lithuanian Grand Duke Gediminas (2002).
