= Aleut Ka =

Cyrillic letter

- Ԟ ԟ

Usage
- Writing system: Cyrillic
- Type: Alphabetic
- Sound values: /q/

Aleut Ka (Ԟ ԟ; italics: Ԟ ԟ) is a letter of the Cyrillic script. It is formed from the Cyrillic letter Ka (К к) by adding a stroke to the upper diagonal arm.

Aleut Ka was used in the alphabet of the Aleut language in the 19th century, where it represented the voiceless uvular plosive /q/ (like the ‘k’ in ‘kite’ but uvular). During the revival of the Aleut Cyrillic alphabet in the 1980s it has been replaced by the Ka with hook.

== Computing codes ==
Character information
Preview	Ԟ		ԟ	
Unicode name	CYRILLIC CAPITAL LETTER; ALEUT KA		CYRILLIC SMALL LETTER; ALEUT KA	
Encodings	decimal	hex	dec	hex
Unicode	1310	U+051E	1311	U+051F
UTF-8	212 158	D4 9E	212 159	D4 9F
Numeric character reference	&#1310;	&#x51E;	&#1311;	&#x51F;

== See also ==
Other Cyrillic letters used to write the sound /q/:

- Қ қ : Cyrillic letter Ka with descender
- Ӄ ӄ : Cyrillic letter Ka with hook
- Ҡ ҡ : Cyrillic letter Bashkir Qa
- Ԛ ԛ : Cyrillic letter Qa
- Cyrillic characters in Unicode
