= Ossetian alphabet =

Script used for the Eastern Iranian language

Ossetian script is the script used to write the Ossetian language. Over the course of its existence, its graphic base has changed several times and has been repeatedly reformed. Currently, the Ossetian script is written using the Cyrillic alphabet.

The history of Ossetian writing is divided into five stages:

- Before 1844 – early attempts to create a writing system based on the Cyrillic and Georgian scripts;
- 1844–1923 – the Sjögren-Miller alphabet based on the Cyrillic alphabet;
- 1923–1938 – writing based on the Latin alphabet;
- 1938–1954 – parallel existence of writing systems based on the Cyrillic and Georgian scripts;
- Since 1954 – writing based on the Cyrillic alphabet.

== Early alphabets ==
The oldest surviving example of Ossetian writing is the Zelenchuk Inscription—a 10th century tombstone written in Greek letters in the Digor dialect of Ossetian. The text was deciphered by Vsevolod Miller and clarified by Vasily Abaev. No Ossetian texts were recorded in later periods.

In the mid-18th century, under the Georgian king Erekle II, Georgian Orthodox missionaries began translating church books into Ossetian. The first such book was printed in 1753 using the Georgian alphabet with the addition of special characters for the Ossetian language.

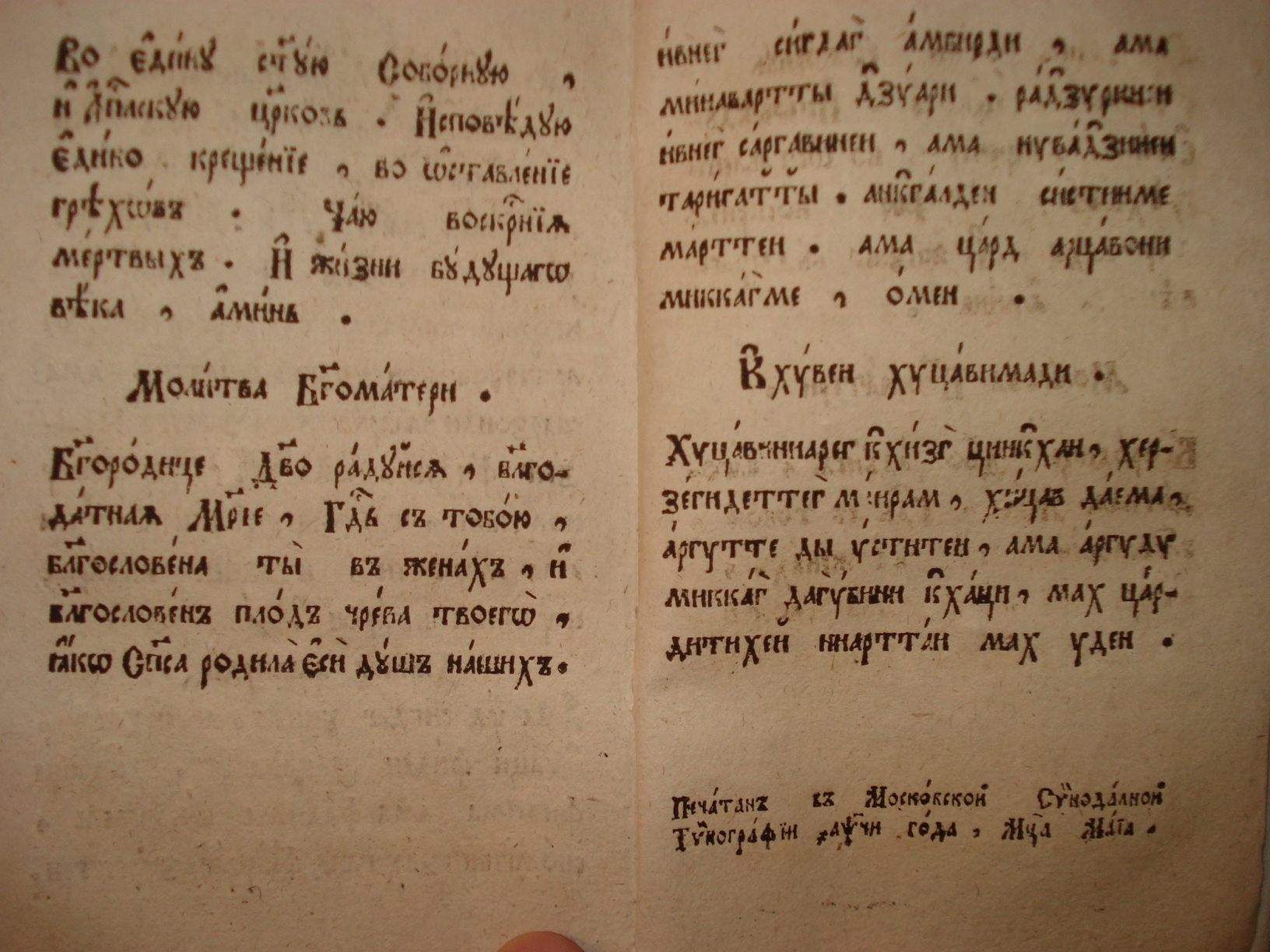
"Small Catechism" of 1798. Parallel text, Ossetian on the right

In 1764, the Russian authorities opened a school in Mozdok to train missionaries and officials from among newly baptized Ossetians. Children were taught in Russian, which was not producing the desired results. For this reason, it was decided to develop an Ossetian written language and translate a number of liturgical books into it. One of the most active missionaries, Gai (Takaov), compiled an Ossetian alphabet based on Cyrillic Church Slavonic letters, and in 1798, the "Small Catechism" was published in this alphabet with parallel texts in Church Slavonic and Ossetian (in Takaov's translation). In addition to the letters of the Russian alphabet, this publication used the digraphs д҄ж, д҄з, д҄ц, д҄ч, к҄г, к҄х with a diacritic sign (kamora) above. The translation of the Catechism, despite a large number of obvious errors and typos, serves as an important source of information about the Ossetian language of the 18th century: in particular, based on this text, it was suggested that /к/, /г/ and /къ/ was later converted into /ч/, /дж/ and /чъ/ (the text contains, for example, the word кызг, which corresponds to modern чызг). This alphabet did not undergo further development.

In the early 19th century, the translator and official Ioane Yalguzidze translated a number of documents from Georgian into Ossetian. He used Georgian letters. In 1819, he published an Ossetian prayer book and primer, which used the clerical version of the Georgian script—khutsuri—with the addition of several letters for specific Ossetian sounds. Later, between 1820 and 1824, several more ecclesiastical books were published in this alphabet. This alphabet, too, was not widely used.

In the 18th and 19th centuries, some scholars (Peter Simon Pallas, Julius Klaproth, Johann Anton Güldenstädt, and others) compiled lists of words in the Ossetian language using various graphic systems. From the perspective of the evolution of writing and the spread of literacy in the Ossetian language, these experiments were not continued.

== Sjögren-Miller alphabet ==
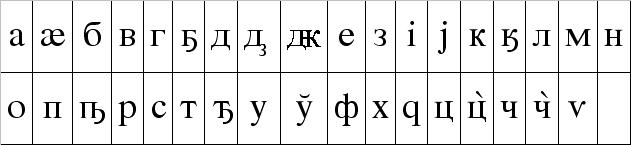
Sjögren alphabet

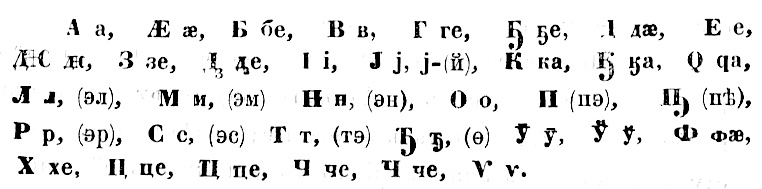
Chepigovsky alphabet

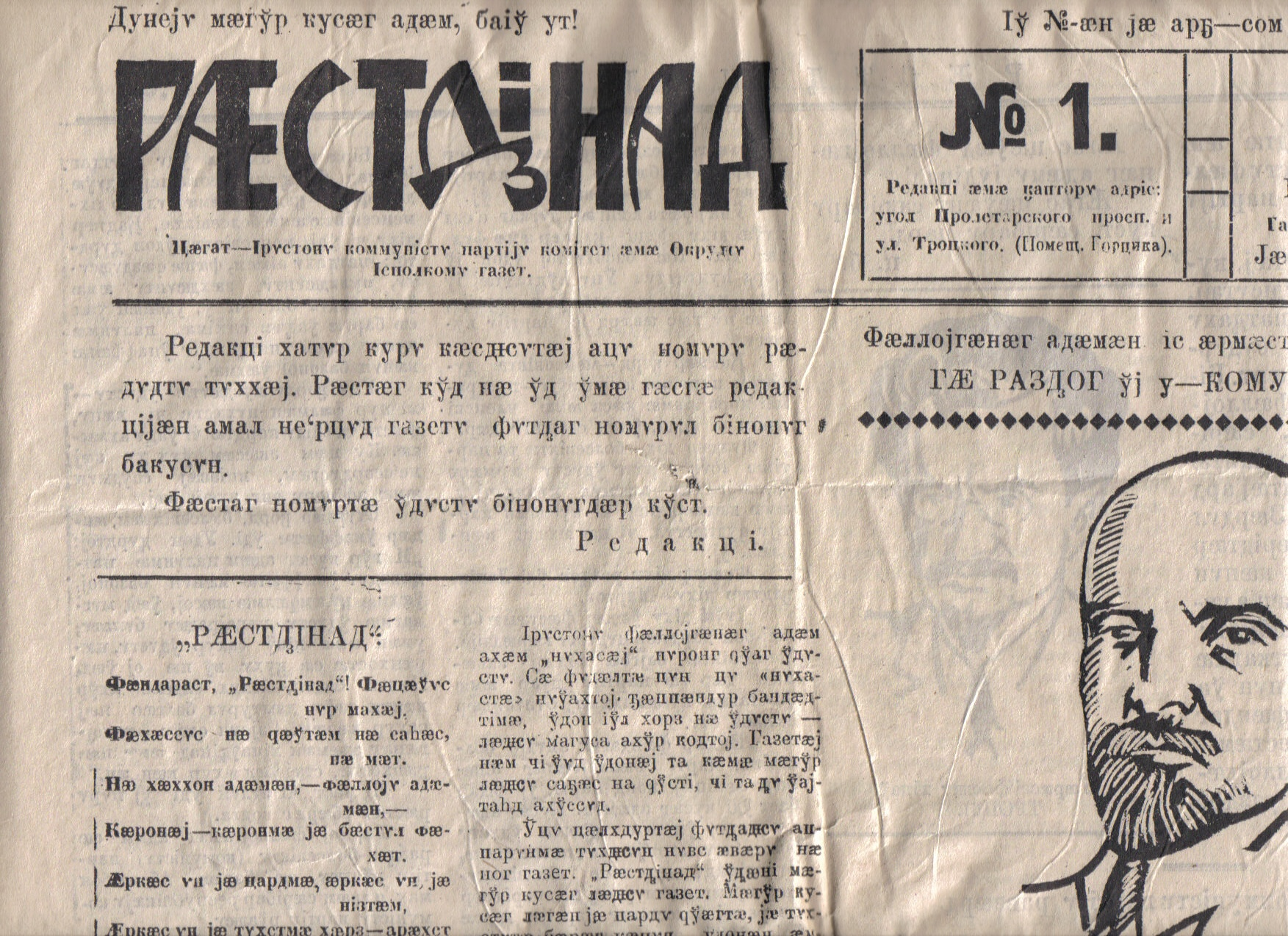
The first Ossetian alphabet based on Cyrillic (the "Sjögren alphabet"). The first issue of the newspaper "Ræstdzinad", March 14, 1923

The credit for creating a fully-fledged Ossetian written language goes to Academician Anders Sjögren. In the 1830s, he began researching the Ossetian language. This work resulted in the publication of the Ossetian Grammar in 1844, along with a Russian-Ossetian and Ossetian-Russian dictionary. In this grammar, the author explains in detail the phonetics of the Ossetian language and the correspondence of sounds to the alphabet he developed. Sjögren's alphabet was based on the Cyrillic alphabet and had the following composition: а б в ꜧ г ҕ г̀ д д̀ ӕ е é з ж ꚉ ԫ і ј к ӄ к̀ ӄ̀ q л м н ң о ӧ п ҧ р с ш т ꚋ т̀ w у ѵ ф х ц ч ҵ ꚓ. The diacritic sign grave (`) denoted the softening of a consonant (in some of Sjögren's early works, he used the letter j after a consonant instead of grave). Despite the alphabet's complexity, it proved to be quite successful and, from 1848, in a slightly modified form, began to be used in the publication of church literature. Sjögren noted that the Georgian alphabet was more suitable for conveying the Ossetian sound system than Cyrillic.

Several more versions of the Ossetian script were created based on Sjögren's alphabet. For example, in 1862, Iosif Chepigovsky compiled an alphabet that had the following form: а ӕ б в г ҕ д ꚉ ԫ е з і ј к ӄ q л м н о п ҧ р с т ꚋ ӯ ў ф х ц ҵ ч ꚓ ѵ. Several books were published in it by the end of the 19th century.

The logical continuation of the development of Sjögren's alphabet was the alphabet proposed by Academician Vsevolod Miller in 1879. In it, compared to Sjögren's alphabet, the outlines of a number of letters were modified and the overall number of symbols was reduced. The cultural development of Ossetia, which began in the 1860s (the construction of schools, the emergence of secular literature (including the works of Kosta Khetagurov)) contributed to the spread of the Sjögren-Miller alphabet and its transformation into a unified national script.

At the same time, the alphabet, not to mention the rules of spelling, was not firmly established during that period, so different publications used different variations. The development of the Ossetian national press, which became especially active after the revolution of 1905, contributed to the development of a unified alphabet, but inconsistencies among publications continued. For example, the magazine "Хурытын" used the z sign for the [dz] sound, while the magazine "Ӕфсир" used the g sign for the same sound.

From July 10 to 16, 1917, a teachers' congress was held in Vladikavkaz, where a unified Ossetian alphabet was developed, based on the Sjögren-Miller alphabet. This alphabet had the following form: а ӕ б в г h д g з z і ј к ӄ q л м н о п ҧ р с т ꚋ у ў ф х ц ҵ ч ꚓ ѵ ꜧ. However, even after the congress, the inconsistency in the alphabets used continued.

There was also an attempt to create an Ossetian written language based on Arabic script: in 1912, S. Taisaev published a primer for Ossetian Muslims in Temir-Khan-Shura. It used the Arabic alphabet with the addition of a large number of special symbols to reflect the peculiarities of Ossetian phonetics. This attempt proved isolated and was not developed further.

== Latin alphabet ==
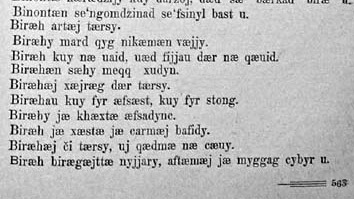
Ossetian alphabet based on Latin, 1923–1938. Part of a page from a book published in 1935 (alphabetical list of proverbs)

In 1920, members of the Ossetian Historical and Philological Society began discussing the transition to a Latinized script in Ossetia, but it was initially criticized by defenders of the existing script. In 1923, a competition for the best alphabet design was announced, but no winner emerged. Soon, based on the submitted designs, the People's Commissariat of Education of the Mountain ASSR compiled a Latinized Ossetian alphabet. After the alphabet was agreed upon with South Ossetia in 1923, it was approved and immediately began to be implemented in education and the press. The ligatures and letters with diacritics that existed in the Sjögren-Miller alphabet were replaced with digraphs, which was met with criticism.

The Ossetians were the first in the North Caucasus and among the first in the USSR to switch to the Latinized alphabet, which is why the alphabet was not unified with other alphabets of the peoples of the USSR.

According to the journal "Culture and Writing of the East" (No. 1, 1928) («Культура и письменность Востока» (№ 1, 1928 год)), the first version of the Ossetian Latinized alphabet had the following form: a в c d e f i g h j k l m n o p r s t u v z æ y u q x ś ż t’ p’ k’ c’ ç ç’ dz dž į, while there were differences in the recording of individual consonants in North and South Ossetia. However, the alphabet actually used (after the exclusion of the letters W w and Ꜧ ꜧ from it in the mid-1920s) looked like this:

A a	Æ æ	B b	C c	Ch ch	Č č	Čh čh	D d	Dz dz	Dž dž	E e	F f
G g	H h	I i	J j	K k	Kh kh	L l	M m	N n	O o	P p	Ph ph
Q q	R r	S s	Š š	T t	Th th	U u	V v	X x	Y y	Z z

This alphabet was used until 1938.

== Georgian alphabet ==
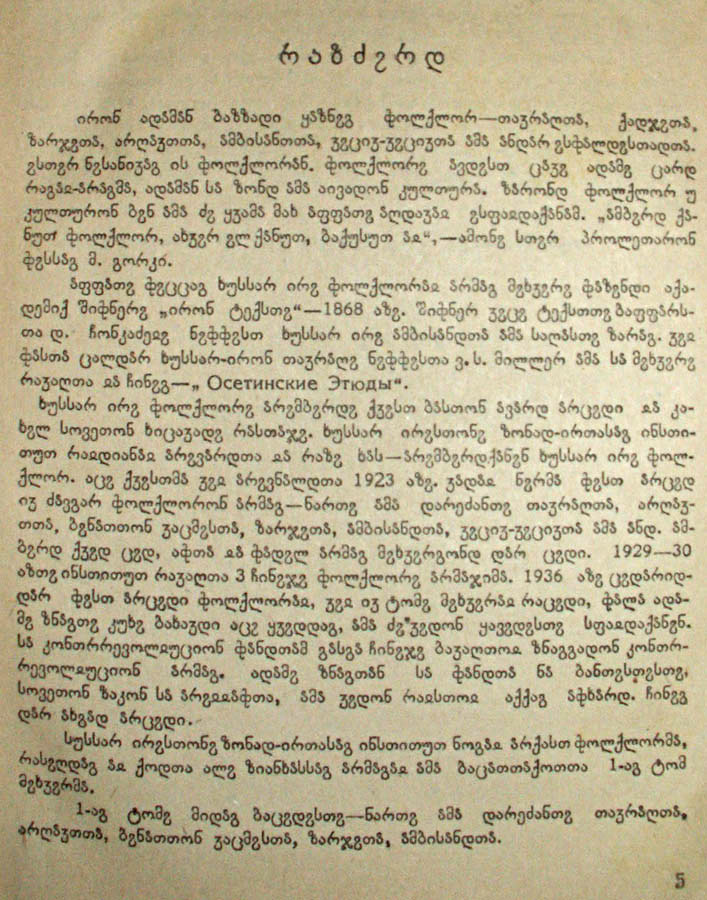
An example of Ossetian list in Georgian script. Preface to a book published in 1940.

In 1938, in the South Ossetian Autonomous Oblast, which was part of the Georgian SSR, the Ossetian script was converted to the Georgian alphabet (while in the North Ossetian Autonomous Republic, which was part of the RSFSR, the Cyrillic alphabet began to be used that same year). Thus, in the two Ossetian autonomous regions, two parallel writing systems coexisted at that time. The Georgian alphabet for the Ossetian language included all the letters of the Georgian alphabet, as well as ჷ ჲ ჳ ჶ ჽ. In 1954, this script was abolished, and the Cyrillic alphabet, the same as in North Ossetia, was introduced in South Ossetia.

The alphabet looked like this:

ა	ბ	ც	დ	ე	ჶ	გ	ღ	ი	ჲ	ქ	ლ	მ
ნ	ო	ფ	რ	ს	თ	უ	ვ	ზ	ყ	ხ	ჩ	შ
ჟ	ჰ	ჽ	ჷ	წ	ჭ	კ	პ	ტ	ძ	ჯ	ჳ

== Modern Cyrillic alphabet ==
In 1938, during the process of Cyrillization of the written languages of the peoples of the USSR, the Ossetian alphabet in North Ossetia was converted to the Cyrillic alphabet. (Note: According to the initial draft, published in the newspaper Ræstdzinad on May 12, 1938, instead of the letter Ӕ ӕ, the digraph Аь аь was proposed.) In 1954, the Ossetian script in South Ossetia was also converted to the Cyrillic alphabet. Since then, no changes have been made to the Ossetian script.

Modern Cyrillic alphabet

А а	Ӕ ӕ	Б б	В в	Г г	Гъ гъ	Д д	Дж дж	Дз дз	Е е	Ё ё
Ж ж	З з	И и	Й й	К к	Къ къ	Л л	М м	Н н	О о	П п
Пъ пъ	Р р	С с	Т т	Тъ тъ	У у	Ф ф	Х х	Хъ хъ	Ц ц	Цъ цъ
Ч ч	Чъ чъ	Ш ш	Щ щ	Ъ ъ	Ы ы	Ь ь	Э э	Ю ю	Я я

The letters ё, ж, ш, щ, ь, э, ю, я (as well as ъ outside the digraphs) are used only in borrowings. The letter у denotes two phonemes simultaneously, the vowel /u/ and the consonant /w/. Ossetian has nine diagraphs that are counted as distinct letters in themselves, and assigned to a specific place in the alphabet. The digraphs къ, пъ, тъ, цъ, and чъ denote glottalized (eruptive) sounds, гъ is a uvular voiced trill consonant, хъ is a uvular voiceless stop consonant, дж and дз are affricates; the ligature ӕ is a front broad vowel.

The six labialized consonant sounds of Ossetian do not have their own letters but are represented by di- and trigraphs: гу, гъу, ку, къу, ху, хъу. These are not considered distinct letters of the alphabet.

== Correspondence chart ==
Current alphabet (since 1938)	Sjögren’s alphabet (1844)	Miller’s alphabet (1881)	Alphabet of the Teachers' Congress (1917)	Latinized alphabet (1923—1938)	Georgian-based alphabet (South Osetia, 1938—1954)	IPA (iron dialect)	IPA (digor dialect)
А а	А а			A a	ა	[a]	[ɑː]
Ӕ ӕ	Ӕ ӕ			Æ æ	ჽ	[ɐ]	[ʌ]
Б б	Б б			B b	ბ	[b]	
В в	В в			V v	ვ	[v]	
Г г	Г г			G g	გ	[g]	
Гъ гъ	Ҕ ҕ	Г̓ г̓	H h	Ꜧ ꜧ, H h	ღ	[ʁ]	[ɣ]
Д д	Д д			D d	დ	[d]	
Дз дз	Ꚉ ꚉ		Z z	Dz dz	ძ	[z]~[d͡z]	[d͡ʒ]
Дж дж	Ԫ ԫ	Џ џ	G g	Dž dž	ჯ	[d͡ʒ]	—
Е е	Е е			E e	ე	[e]	[eː]
Ё ё	—					[jo]	
Ж ж	Ж ж			Ž ž	ჟ	[ʒ]	—
З з	З з			Z z	ზ	[ʒ]~[z]	[z]~[ʒ]
И и	І і			I i	ი	[i]	[iː]~[ɪ]
Й й	Ј ј			J j	ჲ	[j]	—
К к	К к			K k	ქ	[k]	
Къ къ	Ӄ ӄ	К̓ к̓	Ӄ ӄ	Kh kh	კ	[kʼ]	
Л л	Л л			L l	ლ	[l]	
М м	М м			M m	მ	[m]	
Н н	Н н			N n	ნ	[n]	
О о	О о			O o	ო	[o]	[ɔː]
П п	П п			P p	ფ	[p]	
Пъ пъ	Ҧ ҧ	П̓ п̓	Ҧ ҧ	Ph ph	პ	[pʼ]	
Р р	Р р			R r	რ	[r]	
С с	С с			S s	ს	[ʃ]~[s]	[s]~[ʃ]
Т т	Т т			T t	თ	[t]	
Тъ тъ	Ꚋ ꚋ	Т̓ т̓	Ꚋ ꚋ	Th th	ტ	[tʼ]	
У у	У у			U u	უ	[u]	
У у	Ў ў			W w	ჳ	[w]	[ʋ]
Ф ф	Ф ф			F f	ჶ	[f]	
Х х	Х х			X x	ხ	[χ]	[x]
Хъ хъ	Ԛ ԛ			Q q	ყ	[q]	
Ц ц	Ц ц			C c	ც	[s]~[t͡s]	[t͡s]~[t͡ʃ]
Цъ цъ	Ҵ ҵ	Ц̓ ц̓	Ҵ ҵ	Ch ch	წ	[t͡sʼ]	[t͡sʼ]~[t͡ʃʼ]
Ч ч	Ч ч			Č č	ჩ	[t͡ʃ]	—
Чъ чъ	Ꚓ ꚓ	Ч̓ ч̓	Ꚓ ꚓ	Čh čh	ჭ	[t͡ʃʼ]	—
Ш ш	Ш ш	—		Š š	შ	[ʃ]	—
Щ щ	—					[ɕ]	—
ъ	—						
Ы ы	Ѵ ѵ			Y y	ჷ	[ə]	—
ь	—						
Э э	—					[ɛ]	—
Ю ю	—					[ju]	—
Я я	—					[ja]	—

== Bibliography ==
- Bigulaev, B. B. (1945). История осетинского письма [History of Ossetian Writing] (Thesis) (in Russian). Dzaudzhikau: North Ossetian Research Institute.
- Шёгрен А. М. (1844). Осетинская грамматика с кратким словарем осетинско-российским и российско-осетинским. СПб.. Доступен также более чистый скан книги по репринту 2009 года.
- Осетинские тексты // Записки Императорской академіи наук. Том 14, Выпуск 2. СПб.: Императорская академія наук, 1868.
