= Anders Johan Sjögren =

Finnish linguist, ethnographer, historian and explorer

Anders Sjögren
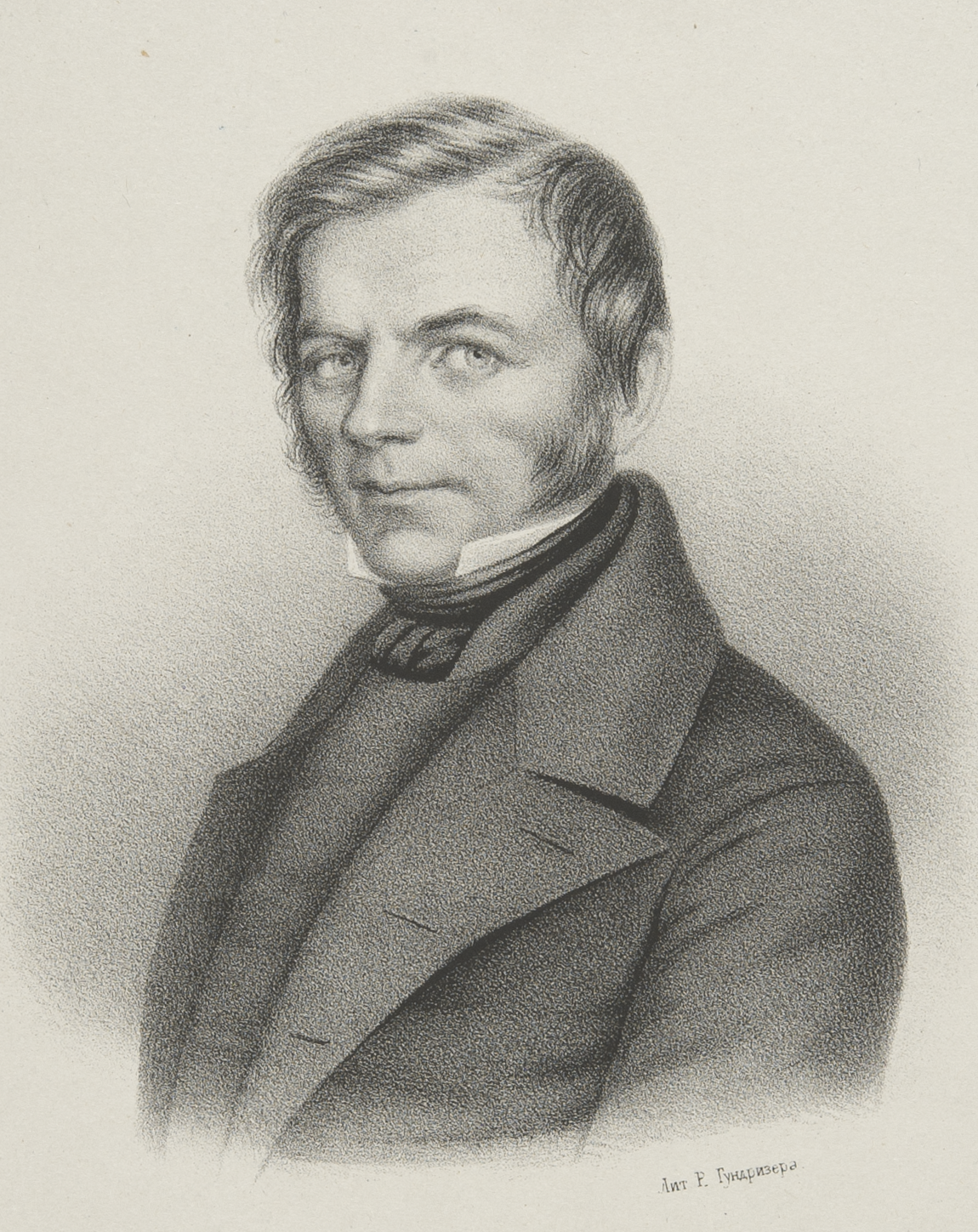
- Born: 8 May 1794; Iitti, Finland, Kingdom of Sweden
- Died: 18 January 1855 (aged 60); Saint Petersburg, Russian Empire
- Education: Imperial Academy of Turku
- Known for: Researcher of Finno-Ugric and Samoyedic languages
- Scientific career
- Workplaces: Saint Petersburg Academy of Sciences

Anders Johan Sjögren (Note: His name is also spelled Andreas Johan Sjögren. In Russian he is also known as Andrei Mikhailovich Shëgren (Андре́й Миха́йлович Шёгрен). In Finnish, the name Antti Juhani Sjögren has sometimes been used.) (8 May 1794 – 18 January 1855) was a Finnish linguist, ethnographer, historian and explorer. He was the first to systematically apply scientific methodology and fieldwork to the study of Finno-Ugric languages, combining linguistic analysis with ethnographic observation and historical research. On his expeditions across Russia, the Baltic region, and the Caucasus, he documented languages, collected folklore, and studied the social and cultural life of various peoples. His interdisciplinary approach became a model for later research on Finno-Ugric languages and cultures. Sjögren is also regarded the creator of the Ossetian Cyrillic alphabet, which is still used today with some modifications.

== Early life and education ==
Anders Johan was born in the village of Sitikkala in Iitti, Finland, into a Finnish-speaking family of craftsmen. His father, Michael Johansson (Mikko Juhonpoika), was a shoemaker, and his mother, Karin Aronsdotter (Kaisa Aaronintytär) Hogen, was the daughter of a blacksmith. At the time of his birth, Finland was part of the Kingdom of Sweden, with Iitti located close to the Russian border. In 1809, Finland was ceded to the Russian Empire.

Both of his parents were literate, and his mother taught him to read. His intellectual abilities were noticed by local clergymen, who arranged for him to receive instruction in Swedish (the language of education in Finland at the time), and provided financial support for him to attend school in Loviisa (1803–1809) and the gymnasium in Porvoo (1809–1813). After completing gymnasium, he moved to Turku (Åbo) to study at the Imperial Academy of Turku, graduating in 1819 as Doctor of Philosophy. He finance his studies through tutoring and loans.

Sjögren's focus on Finno-Ugric peoples developed during his studies at Turku. He absorbed the legacy of Henrik Gabriel Porthan, who emphasized the historical connection between Finns and related Finno-Ugric groups within the Russian Empire. Sjögren was also influenced by Herderian romantic nationalism, which highlighted the role of language and folklore in national identity. As a central figure in the Turku Romanticism movement, Sjögren shared these views. He made his first field trip to collect Finnish folklore in 1814. Following the example of the Danish linguist Rasmus Rask, who visited Turku in 1818, Sjögren was guided towards an approach advocating learning the living language directly from native speakers through fieldwork.

== Career ==
=== Move and early career ===
Sjögren's academic interests also aligned with political priorities in the Russian Empire. Since 1816, Chancellor Nikolay Rumyantsev had sought a suitable person to undertake expeditions among Russia's Finno-Ugric peoples. Early candidates such as Gustaf Renvall and Eric Gustaf Ehrström declined, and Renvall instead recommended Sjögren, considering him particularly suited for the task. Sjögren also became interested, and moved to St. Petersburg in 1819 in the hope of securing support for the expedition.

In St. Petersburg, Sjögren worked initially as a private tutor while pursuing his research. With the guidance of pastor Anders Hipping and others, he established connections within the St. Petersburg Academy of Sciences. His publication Ueber die finnische Sprache und ihre Literatur (1821), funded by Rumyantsev, significantly raised his profile. Sjögren was a bibliophile, and in 1823, he succeeded Hipping as Rumyantsev's librarian. In 1823, after some initial setbacks, he finally secured imperial approval and funding for his long-planned expedition. With Hipping's help, he had gained the support of the Finnish State Secretary Robert Henrik Rehbinder, and the funding came from the Finnish state treasury. Sjögren made a preparatory trip around Lake Ladoga in the summer of 1823. This trip taught him the importance of studying the local archives, and he practiced making observations in the field.

=== Northern Russia and Finnish Lapland (1824–1829) ===
Sjögren traveled in Northern Russia and Finland for five years, from 1824 to 1829. The scientific motivation for the journey, as stated by Sjögren, drew on Porthan's historical research on Finland and on the Primary Chronicle, which tells the early history of Russia, listing various Finno-Ugric peoples. The initial plan was to examine a variety of Finno-Ugric peoples, extending from Finland to the Volga region and as far as western Siberia. He started his journey with a two-month stay in Novgorod where he studied old manuscripts. He then continued to study the Baltic Finnic peoples in Olonets and White Karelia, northeastern Finland, and the Sámi in Lapland and the Kola Peninsula. From Kola, he traveled east to Perm near the Ural Mountains. He intended to continue to western Siberia, but was persuaded by the academicians to return to St. Petersburg. On the return journey, he took a southern route through Kazan and Vologda.

From the expedition Sjögren brought back a vast collection of material on the history, languages, folk poetry, onomastics, and ethnography of the peoples he encountered. In the following years, he analyzed his findings and published the results between 1830 and 1834. These included a classification of Finno-Ugric languages based on linguistic evidence, the first description of Veps people, a description of the Komi language and clarification of the relationship between the Sámi languages and Finnish.

=== Caucasus (1835–1838), Livonia and Courland ===
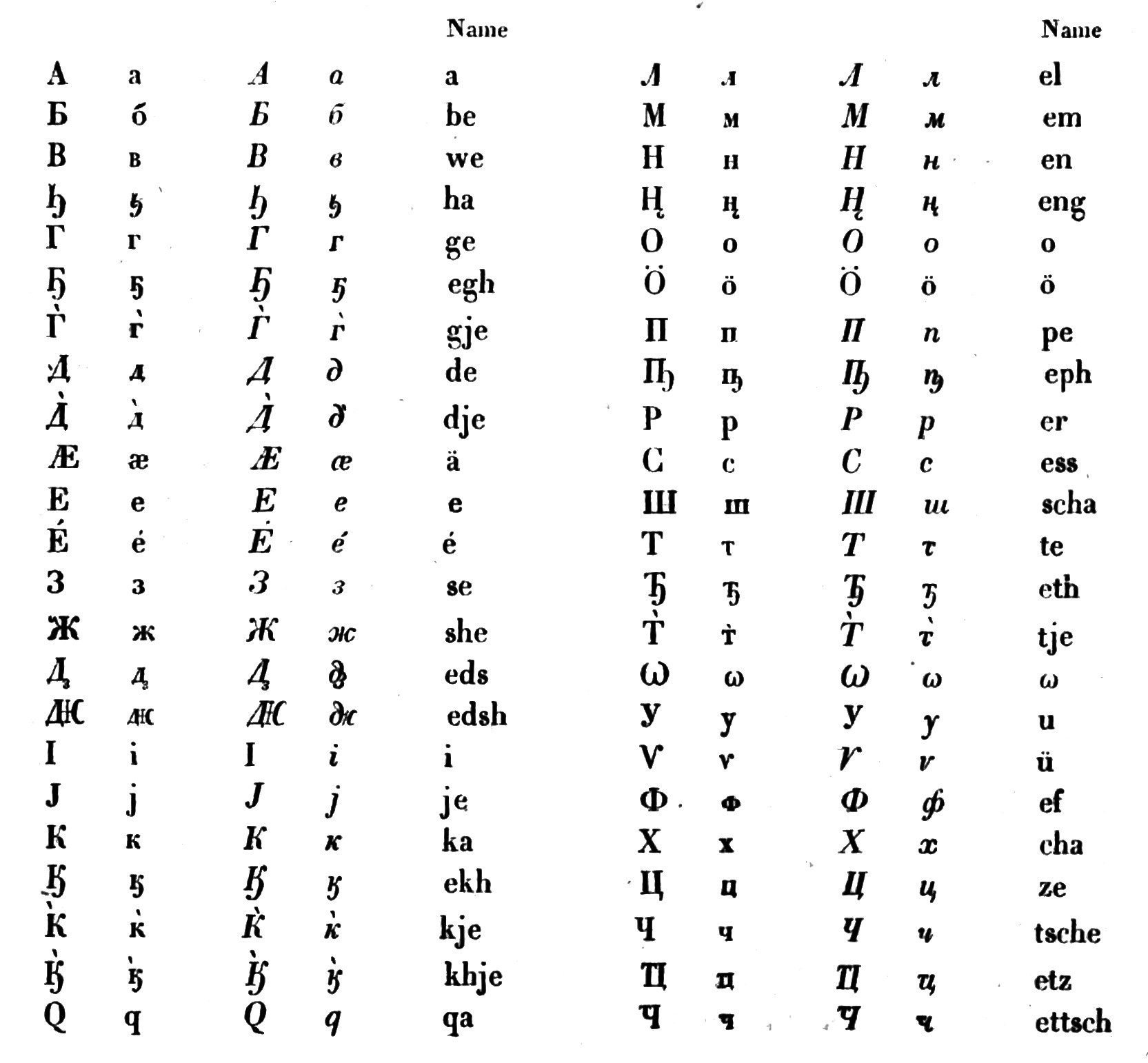
Sjögren's 1844 Ossetian alphabet

In 1835–1838, he traveled around the Caucasus, exploring the languages and ethnography of the Ossetians, Georgians and some other Caucasian peoples. In 1846–1852, he collected field materials in Livland and Courland for the Russian Geographical Society. He created a grammar and dictionary of the Liv language, which were published after his death by Ferdinand Wiedemann, as well as the first "Ossetian Grammar" (Grammatik der ossetischen Sprache).

He was elected to the Russian Academy of Sciences and through the Academy provided sponsorship and research funding to Matthias Castrén, another ethnologist and philologist in the study of Uralic languages.

== Legacy ==
Sjögren's diaries, the Ephemerider, span from 1806 to 1855 and comprise more than 8,000 handwritten pages. Written primarily in Swedish but also containing passages in German, Latin, French, and Russian, they contain information on his scientific work, personal reflections, social life, and the intellectual currents of his time. The diaries were published in 2020 on the initiative of Michael Branch and were also edited by Esko Häkli and Marja Leinonen.

== Literature ==
- Branch, Michael (1973). A. J. Sjögren: Studies of the North. Helsinki: Finno-Ugrian Society.
- Sjögren, Anders Johan (2020). Branch, Michael; Häkli, Esko; Leinonen, Marja (eds.). Allmänna Ephemerider. Dagböckerna 1806–1855 (in Swedish). National biblioteket. ISBN 978-951-51-6139-0.
- Laine, Päivi (2020). Suutarinpojasta Venäjän tiedeakatemian akateemikoksi: A. J. Sjögrenin ura Pietarissa 1820–1855 (PhD thesis) (in Finnish). Tampere University. ISBN 978-952-03-1567-2.
- Stipa, Günter Johannes (1990). Finnisch-ugrische Sprachforschung von der Renaissance bis zum Neupositivismus (in German). Helsinki: Suomalais-Ugrilainen Seura. ISBN 951-9403-34-5.
