= Bashkir Qa =

Cyrillic letter used for /q/ in two languages

- Ҡ ҡ

Usage
- Writing system: Cyrillic
- Type: Alphabetic
- Language of origin: Bashkir language
- Sound values: /q/

Bashkir Qa or Bashkir Ka (Ҡ ҡ; italics: Ҡ ҡ) is a letter of the Cyrillic script. It is formed from the Cyrillic letter Ka (К к) with the top extending horizontally to the left. It is used in the alphabet of the Bashkir language and (some forms of) Siberian Tatar. It represents the voiceless uvular plosive /q/.

It corresponds to, and is pronounced the same as, the letter Қ in Kazakh, Karakalpak, Uzbek, and (some forms of) Siberian Tatar. It is represented in the Arabic script for Bashkir as ق.

== Computing codes ==
Character information
Preview	Ҡ		ҡ	
Unicode name	CYRILLIC CAPITAL LETTER; BASHKIR KA		CYRILLIC SMALL LETTER; BASHKIR KA	
Encodings	decimal	hex	dec	hex
Unicode	1184	U+04A0	1185	U+04A1
UTF-8	210 160	D2 A0	210 161	D2 A1
Numeric character reference	&#1184;	&#x4A0;	&#1185;	&#x4A1;

== See also ==
Other Cyrillic letters used to write the sound /q/:

- Қ қ : Cyrillic letter Ka with descender
- Ӄ ӄ : Cyrillic letter Ka with hook
- Ԟ ԟ : Cyrillic letter Aleut Ka
- Ԛ ԛ : Cyrillic letter Qa
- Cyrillic characters in Unicode
