= Ka (Cyrillic) =

Letter of the Cyrillic script

Ka (како)
- К к

Usage
- Writing system: Cyrillic
- Type: Alphabetic
- Language of origin: Old Church Slavonic
- Sound values: [k]
- In Unicode: U+041A, U+043A

History
Development
D46
      - Κ κ
        - К к

Other
- Associated numbers: 20 (Cyrillic numerals)

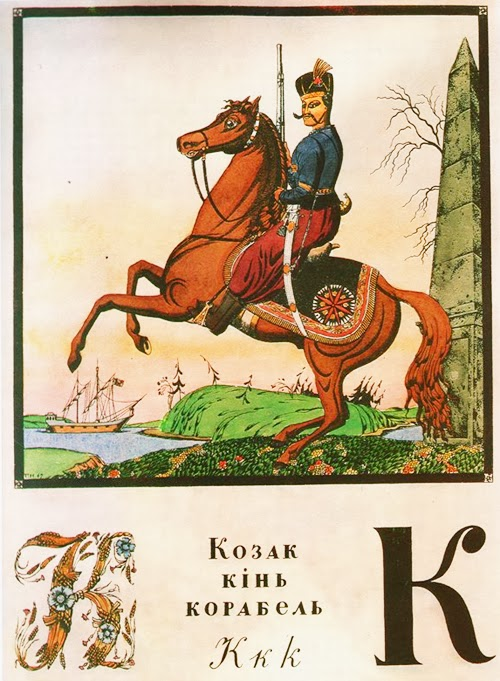
Ka in Heorhiy Narbut's Azbuka (1917).

Ka (К к; italics: К к or К к; italics: К к) is a letter of the Cyrillic script.

It commonly represents the voiceless velar plosive /k/, like the pronunciation of ⟨k⟩ in "(k)ing" or "(k)ick".

== History ==
The Cyrillic letter Ka was derived from the Greek letter Kappa (Κ κ).

In the Early Cyrillic alphabet its name was како (kako), meaning "as".

In the Cyrillic numeral system, Ka had a value of 20.

== Form ==
The Cyrillic letter Ka looks very similar, and corresponds to the Latin letter K. In many fonts, Cyrillic Ka is differentiated from its Latin and Greek counterparts by drawing one or both of its diagonal spurs curved instead of straight. Also in some fonts the lowercase form of Ka has the vertical bar elongated above x-height, resembling the Latin lowercase k.

== Usage ==
In Russian, the letter Ka represents the plain voiceless velar plosive /k/ or the palatalized one /kʲ/; for example, the word "короткий" ("short") contains both the kinds: [kɐˈrotkʲɪj]. The palatalized variant is pronounced when the following letter in the word is ь, е, ё, и, ю, or я.

In Macedonian and Serbian, it always represents the sound /k/.

== Related letters and other similar characters ==
- Κ κ/ϰ : Greek letter Kappa
- K k : Latin letter K
- Q q : Latin letter Q
- C c : Latin letter C
- X x : Latin letter X
- Ka with descender
- Ka with hook
- Ka with stroke
- Ka with vertical stroke
- Aleut Ka
- Bashkir Ka
- Kje

== Computing codes ==
Character information
Preview	К		к	
Unicode name	CYRILLIC CAPITAL LETTER KA		CYRILLIC SMALL LETTER KA	
Encodings	decimal	hex	dec	hex
Unicode	1050	U+041A	1082	U+043A
UTF-8	208 154	D0 9A	208 186	D0 BA
Numeric character reference	&#1050;	&#x41A;	&#1082;	&#x43A;
Named character reference	&Kcy;		&kcy;	
KOI8-R and KOI8-U	235	EB	203	CB
Code page 855	199	C7	198	C6
Code page 866	138	8A	170	AA
Windows-1251	202	CA	234	EA
ISO-8859-5	186	BA	218	DA
Macintosh Cyrillic	138	8A	234	EA
