= Ka with descender =

Cyrillic letter used in various languages

- Қ қ

Usage
- Writing system: Cyrillic
- Type: Alphabetic
- Sound values: [q], [kʰ]

Ka with descender (Қ қ; italics: Қ қ), is a letter of the Cyrillic script used in a number of non-Slavic languages spoken in the territory of the former Soviet Union, including:

- the Turkic languages Kazakh, Uyghur, Uzbek and several smaller languages (Karakalpak, Shor and Tofa), where it represents the voiceless uvular plosive /q/.
- Iranian languages such as Tajik and, before 1924, Ossetic (now superseded by the digraph ⟨Къ⟩). Since /q/ is represented by the letter ق qāf in the Arabic alphabet, Қ is sometimes referred to as "Cyrillic Qaf".
- Eastern varieties of the Khanty language, where it also represents /q/.
- the Abkhaz language, where it represents the aspirated voiceless velar plosive /kʰ/. (The Cyrillic letter Ka (К к) is used to represent the ejective /kʼ/.) It was introduced in 1905 for the spelling of Abkhaz. From 1928 to 1938, Abkhaz was spelled with the Latin alphabet, and the corresponding letter was the Latin letter K with descender (Ⱪ ⱪ).
- the Chukchi language in Eastern Siberia, where it represents the voiceless uvular plosive /q/.

Its ISO 9 transliteration is ⟨ķ⟩ (k with cedilla), and this is the standard transliteration for Abkhaz and Chukchi Қ. The common Kazakh and Uzbek Romanization is ⟨q⟩.

== Computing codes ==
Character information
Preview	Қ		қ	
Unicode name	CYRILLIC CAPITAL LETTER; KA WITH DESCENDER		CYRILLIC SMALL LETTER; KA WITH DESCENDER	
Encodings	decimal	hex	dec	hex
Unicode	1178	U+049A	1179	U+049B
UTF-8	210 154	D2 9A	210 155	D2 9B
Numeric character reference	&#1178;	&#x49A;	&#1179;	&#x49B;

== See also ==
Other Cyrillic letters used to write the sound /q/:

- Ӄ ӄ : Cyrillic letter Ka with hook
- Ҡ ҡ : Cyrillic letter Bashkir Qa
- Ԛ ԛ : Cyrillic letter Qa
- Ԟ ԟ : Cyrillic letter Aleut Ka
- Ҟ ҟ : Cyrillic Letter Ka with stroke
- Cyrillic characters in Unicode
