= Breve =

Bowl-shaped diacritic mark (◌̆)

◌̆o

Breve
- U+0306 ◌̆ COMBINING BREVE; U+032E ◌̮ COMBINING BREVE BELOW; U+1DCB ◌᷋ COMBINING BREVE-MACRON

Some typefaces differentiate Cyrillic style (top) and Latin style breve (bottom)

A breve (/ˈbriːv/ BREEV, less often /ˈbrɛv/ BREV, neuter form of the Latin brevis "short, brief") is the diacritic mark ◌̆, shaped like the bottom half of a circle. As used in Ancient Greek, it is also called brachy, βραχύ. It resembles the caron (◌̌) but is rounded, in contrast to the angular tip of the caron. In many forms of Latin, ◌̆ is used for a shorter, softer variant of a vowel, such as "Ĭ", where the sound is nearly identical to the English /ɪ/. (See: Latin IPA)

Breve vs. caron
Breve	Ă ă Ĕ ĕ Ğ ğ Ĭ ĭ Ŏ ŏ Ŭ ŭ Y̆ y̆
Caron	Ǎ ǎ Ě ě Ǧ ǧ Ǐ ǐ Ǒ ǒ Ǔ ǔ Y̌ y̌

== Length ==
The breve sign indicates a short vowel, as opposed to the macron (◌̄), which indicates long vowels, in academic transcription. It is often used that way in dictionaries and textbooks of Latin, Ancient Greek, Tuareg and other languages. However, there is a frequent convention of indicating only the long vowels. It is then understood that a vowel with no macron is short. If the vowel length is unknown, a breve as well as a macron are used in historical linguistics (Ā̆ ā̆ Ē̆ ē̆ Ī̆ ī̆ Ō̆ ō̆ Ū̆ ū̆ Ȳ̆ ȳ̆). In Cyrillic script, a breve is used for Й. In Belarusian, it is used for both the Cyrillic Ў (semivowel U) and in the Latin (Łacinka) Ŭ. Ў was also used in Cyrillic Uzbek under the Soviet Union. The Moldovan Cyrillic alphabet uses a breve on Ӂ to represent a voiced postalveolar affricate /d͡ʒ/ (corresponding to ⟨g⟩ before a front vowel in the Latin script for Moldovan). In Chuvash, a breve is used for Cyrillic letters Ӑ (A-breve) and Ӗ (E-breve). In Itelmen orthography, it is used for Ӑ, О̆ and Ў. The traditional Cyrillic breve differs in shape and is thicker on the edges of the curve and thinner in the middle, as opposed to the Latin one, but the Unicode encoding is the same.

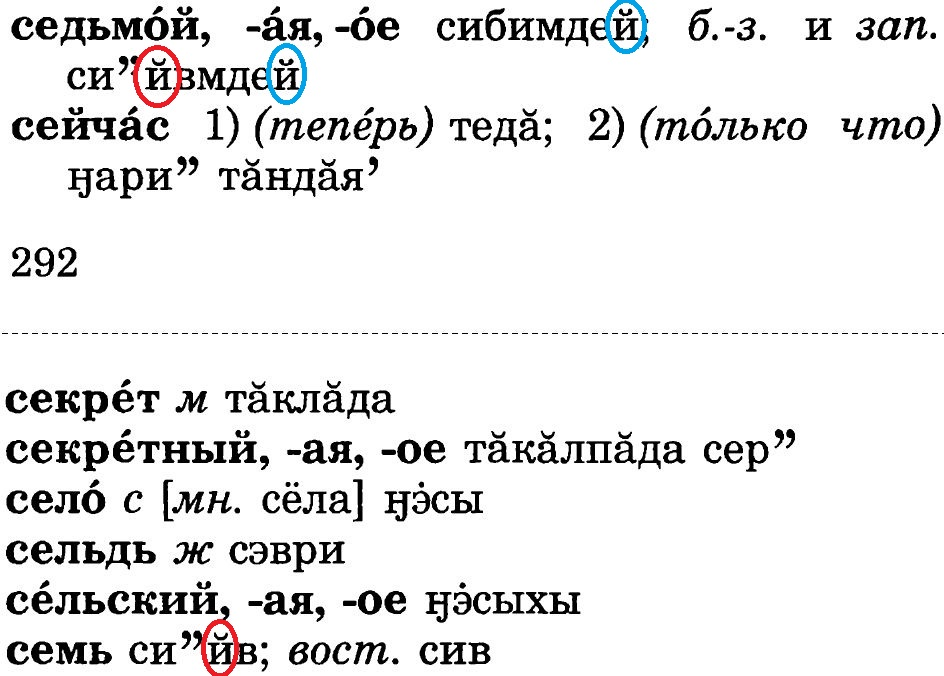
Contrastive use of Cyrillic kratka (for consonant [j]) and Latin breve (for short vowel [ĭ]) above и in Russian–Nenets dictionary

In Emilian, ĕ ŏ are used to represent [ɛ, ɔ] in dialects where also long [ɛː, ɔː] occur.

In Esperanto, u with breve (ŭ) represents a non-syllabic u in diphthongs /u̯/, analogous to Belarusian ў.

In the transcription of Sinhala, the breve over an m or an n indicates a prenasalized consonant; for example, n̆da is used to represent [ⁿda].

In the International Phonetic Alphabet, a breve over a phonetic symbol is used to indicate extra-shortness.

== Other uses ==
In other languages, it is used for other purposes.

- In Romanian, A with breve represents /ə/, as in măr (apple).
- G-breve appears in the Azerbaijani, Kazakh, Crimean Tatar, Tatar, and Turkish alphabets. In Turkish, ğ lengthens the preceding vowel. It is thus placed between two vowels and is silent in standard Turkish but may be pronounced [ɰ] in some regional dialects or varieties closer to Ottoman Turkish.
- The breve, together with the circumflex and horn, are used in the Vietnamese language to represent additional vowels.
- The McCune–Reischauer romanization system of Korean uses ŏ and ŭ to represent the vowels ㅓ and ㅡ.
- H-breve below Ḫ ḫ is used to transliterate the Arabic character Ḫāʾ (خ) in DIN 31635. It is also used to transliterate Akkadian, Hittite cuneiform, and Egyptian hieroglyphs.
- On German language maps, a double breve is often used in abbreviated placenames that end in -b͝g., short for -burg, a common suffix originally meaning "castle". This prevents misinterpretation as -berg, another common suffix in placenames (meaning "mountain"). Thus, for example, Freib͝g. stands for Freiburg, not Freiberg.
- Certain transcription systems for certain varieties of Chinese employ the breve to represent one of the tones, including Foochow Romanized for the Fuzhou dialect of Eastern Min, and Kienning Colloquial Romanized for the Jian'ou dialect of Northern Min (which also uses the caron).
- In Khmer, ă, ĕ, ĭ, ŏ, œ̆, and ŭ are used in Khmer romanization, e.g. siĕm reăp (Siem Reap).
- In the Syriac languages, ĕ is used to denote an "eh" or /ˈɛ/ sound.
- The ISO 259 Romanization of Hebrew uses ă, ḝ, and ŏ for reduced vowels.
- In Spanish-language vocal music, a breve below is sometimes used to indicate elision across word boundaries, as in "por-que ̮en-ton-ces."
- In Malay language, E with breve ĕ was used for schwa in Za'aba Spelling.

== Letters with breve ==
- Breve ◌̆
  Latin: Ă ă
- Ắ ắ
- Ằ ằ
- Ẳ ẳ
- Ẵ ẵ
- Ặ ặ
- C̆ c̆
- Ĕ ĕ
- Ḝ ḝ
- Ğ ğ
- Ḫ ḫ
- Ĭ ĭ
- K̆ k̆
- M̆ m̆
- N̆ n̆
- Ŏ ŏ
- Œ̆ œ̆
- P̆ p̆
- R̆ r̆
- T̆ t̆
- Ŭ ŭ
- V̆ v̆
- X̆ x̆
- Y̆ y̆
  Greek: Ᾰ ᾰ
- Ῐ ῐ
- Ῠ ῠ
  Cyrillic: Ӑ ӑ
- Ӗ ӗ
- Ӂ ӂ
- Й й
- Ў ў

== Breve below ==
The breve below is a diacritic with the same appearance as the conventional breve, except that it is placed under the letter (or space) to be marked. There are just two precomposed character code-points: U+1E2A Ḫ LATIN CAPITAL LETTER H WITH BREVE BELOW and U+1E2B ḫ LATIN SMALL LETTER H WITH BREVE BELOW. For other uses, it is rendered as a combining character, U+032E ◌̮ COMBINING BREVE BELOW.

Traditional editions of Spanish vocal sheet music use the 'breve below' to indicate elision. Modern editions tend to use a (freestanding) underscore.

== Encoding ==
Unicode codepoints for breve characters.

Name	Letter	Unicode
Breve (spacing)	˘	U+02D8 ˘ BREVE
Combining breve	◌̆	U+0306 ◌̆ COMBINING BREVE
Combining breve below	◌̮	U+032E ◌̮ COMBINING BREVE BELOW
Combining double breve	◌͝◌	U+035D ◌͝ COMBINING DOUBLE BREVE
Combining double breve below	◌͜◌	U+035C ◌͜ COMBINING DOUBLE BREVE BELOW
Breve with inverted breve (spacing)	꭛	U+AB5B ꭛ MODIFIER BREVE WITH INVERTED BREVE
Latin
A-breve	Ă ă	U+0102 Ă LATIN CAPITAL LETTER A WITH BREVE; U+0103 ă LATIN SMALL LETTER A WITH BREVE
E-breve	Ĕ ĕ	U+0114 Ĕ LATIN CAPITAL LETTER E WITH BREVE; U+0115 ĕ LATIN SMALL LETTER E WITH BREVE
I-breve	Ĭ ĭ	U+012C Ĭ LATIN CAPITAL LETTER I WITH BREVE; U+012D ĭ LATIN SMALL LETTER I WITH BREVE
O-breve	Ŏ ŏ	U+014E Ŏ LATIN CAPITAL LETTER O WITH BREVE; U+014F ŏ LATIN SMALL LETTER O WITH BREVE
U-breve	Ŭ ŭ	U+016C Ŭ LATIN CAPITAL LETTER U WITH BREVE; U+016D ŭ LATIN SMALL LETTER U WITH BREVE
Azerbaijani, Tatar, Turkish
G-breve	Ğ ğ	U+011E Ğ LATIN CAPITAL LETTER G WITH BREVE; U+011F ğ LATIN SMALL LETTER G WITH BREVE
Vietnamese
A-sắc-breve	Ắ ắ	U+1EAE Ắ LATIN CAPITAL LETTER A WITH BREVE AND ACUTE; U+1EAF ắ LATIN SMALL LETTER A WITH BREVE AND ACUTE
A-huyền-breve	Ằ ằ	U+1EB0 Ằ LATIN CAPITAL LETTER A WITH BREVE AND GRAVE; U+1EB1 ằ LATIN SMALL LETTER A WITH BREVE AND GRAVE
A-hỏi-breve	Ẳ ẳ	U+1EB2 Ẳ LATIN CAPITAL LETTER A WITH BREVE AND HOOK ABOVE; U+1EB3 ẳ LATIN SMALL LETTER A WITH BREVE AND HOOK ABOVE
A-ngã-breve	Ẵ ẵ	U+1EB4 Ẵ LATIN CAPITAL LETTER A WITH BREVE AND TILDE; U+1EB5 ẵ LATIN SMALL LETTER A WITH BREVE AND TILDE
A-nặng-breve	Ặ ặ	U+1EB6 Ặ LATIN CAPITAL LETTER A WITH BREVE AND DOT BELOW; U+1EB7 ặ LATIN SMALL LETTER A WITH BREVE AND DOT BELOW
Cyrillic
A-breve	Ӑ ӑ	U+04D0 Ӑ CYRILLIC CAPITAL LETTER A WITH BREVE; U+04D1 ӑ CYRILLIC SMALL LETTER A WITH BREVE
Ye-breve	Ӗ ӗ	U+04D6 Ӗ CYRILLIC CAPITAL LETTER IE WITH BREVE; U+04D7 ӗ CYRILLIC SMALL LETTER IE WITH BREVE
Zhe-breve	Ӂ ӂ	U+04C1 Ӂ CYRILLIC CAPITAL LETTER ZHE WITH BREVE; U+04C2 ӂ CYRILLIC SMALL LETTER ZHE WITH BREVE
Short I	Й й	U+0419 Й CYRILLIC CAPITAL LETTER SHORT I U+0439 й CYRILLIC SMALL LETTER SHORT I
O-breve	О̆ о̆	U+041E О CYRILLIC CAPITAL LETTER O U+0306 ̆ COMBINING BREVE; U+043E о CYRILLIC SMALL LETTER O U+0306 ̆ COMBINING BREVE
Short U	Ў ў	U+040E Ў CYRILLIC CAPITAL LETTER SHORT U U+045E ў CYRILLIC SMALL LETTER SHORT U
Greek
Alpha with brachy	Ᾰ ᾰ	U+1FB8 Ᾰ GREEK CAPITAL LETTER ALPHA WITH VRACHY; U+1FB0 ᾰ GREEK SMALL LETTER ALPHA WITH VRACHY
Iota with brachy	Ῐ ῐ	U+1FD8 Ῐ GREEK CAPITAL LETTER IOTA WITH VRACHY; U+1FD0 ῐ GREEK SMALL LETTER IOTA WITH VRACHY
Upsilon with brachy	Ῠ ῠ	U+1FE8 Ῠ GREEK CAPITAL LETTER UPSILON WITH VRACHY; U+1FE0 ῠ GREEK SMALL LETTER UPSILON WITH VRACHY
Arabic, Hittite, Akkadian, Egyptian transliteration
H-breve below	Ḫ ḫ	U+1E2A Ḫ LATIN CAPITAL LETTER H WITH BREVE BELOW; U+1E2B ḫ LATIN SMALL LETTER H WITH BREVE BELOW
Hebrew transliteration
E-cedilla-breve	Ḝ ḝ	U+1E1C Ḝ LATIN CAPITAL LETTER E WITH CEDILLA AND BREVE; U+1E1D ḝ LATIN SMALL LETTER E WITH CEDILLA AND BREVE

== See also ==
- Inverted breve – Diacritical mark, ◌̑
- Unicode input – Input characters using their Unicode code points
- Ye with breve – Cyrillic letter used for /ɘ/ in Chuvash (U+04D6 Ӗ CYRILLIC CAPITAL LETTER IE WITH BREVE)
- Short I (Cyrillic) – Letter of the Cyrillic script ((U+0419 Й CYRILLIC CAPITAL LETTER SHORT I)
- O with breve (Cyrillic) – Cyrillic letter used for [ŏ] in Itelmen (О̆ , no precomposed character
