= Mordvinic alphabets =

Cyrillic script used to write Mordvinic languages

Mordvinic alphabets are the writing systems used to write Mordovian (Moksha and Erzyan) languages. From its inception in the 18th century to the present, it has been based on the Cyrillic alphabet. Until the beginning of the 20th century, the alphabet did not have a stable norm and was often changed. The modern alphabet has been in operation since the late 1920s.

== History ==
=== Late 17th - mid 19th century ===
The oldest monument to the recording of the Mordovian languages' material is the work of the Dutch scientist Nicolaes Witsen’s book “Noord en Oost Tartarye” (Northern and Eastern Tataria), published in Amsterdam in 1692. In this book, the author cites a dictionary of 325 Mordovian (mostly Mokshan) words translated into Dutch. Later, in the 18th century, Moksha and Erzya word lists and small texts were repeatedly recorded and published by Russian and foreign scientists (Philip Strahlenberg, E. Fischer, Pyotr Rychkov, Peter Pallas, Johann Georgi etc.). Both Latin and Cyrillic transcriptions were used in their writings.

Graphic display of Mordovian phonemes in records of the 18th century:

UPA	Latin	Cyrillic	UPA	Latin	Cyrillic	UPA	Latin	Cyrillic	UPA	Latin	Cyrillic
[a]	a, aa, ou	а, аа, я	[g]	g	г	[m]	m	м	[x]	ch	
[ä]	ä, a, ai	я, а	[d]	d	д	[n], [n']	n	н	[c], [ć]	ts, z, cz, tz	ц
[o]	o	о	[ž]	sch	ж	[ŋ]	n, ng	н, нг	[č]	tsch, cz	ч
[e]	e	е	[z], [ź]	z, s	з	[ŋ̩g]	ng	нг	[š]	sch, s, sh	ш, с
[u]	u, ou	у, ю	[ʒ], [ʒ']	dz, ds	дз	[p]	p	п	[šč]	schc	щ
[ai]	ai, ei	ай, ей	[j]	j, i	й, ю, я	[r], [ŕ]	r	р	[ks]	ks, cks, x, kx	кс
[i]	i, y	и	[ȷ]	ch, ix		[ʀ], [ʀ']	r		palatal.	j, i	ь
[ə]	i, e, a, y	а	[k]	k, gk, ck, c	к	[s], [s']	s, ss, ß	с			
[b]	b	б	[l], [l']	l, ll	л, лл	[t], [t']	t, d	т, д			
[v (u̠)]	v, w, u	в, у	[ʟ], [ʟ']	x, l		[f]	f, ff	в			

In the second half of the 18th century, the first proper Mordovian (both Moksha and Erzya) texts appeared - mainly translations of short official solemn essays made by the efforts of students and teachers of the Kazan and Nizhny Novgorod seminaries. These works used the Cyrillic alphabet. There has not been any standard writing yet, so different texts use different graphic techniques to convey certain phonemes.

At the beginning of the 19th century, book publishing began in the Mordovian languages. So, in 1804, a translation into the Erzya language of the Church Slavonic primer with a catechism was published. A number of other liturgical books followed. In 1821–1827, a complete Erzya translation of the New Testament was published. However, these books did not receive noticeable distribution, and the translation quality was very low.

=== Mid 19th — early 20th century ===
In 1867, the brotherhood of Saint Guria was founded in Kazan, the purpose of which was to Christianize and educate the peoples of Russia. Thanks to his activities, since the 1870s, publishing in Mordovian languages has become more active. Not only translations of religious texts are published, but also primers appear, as well as individual works of art and folklore materials. Since there were still no standard Erzya and Mokshan alphabets, the writing was different in almost every edition. However, attempts have already been made to standardize writing. Thus, the author-compiler of the Erzya primer A.F. Yurtov developed his own graphic system and more or less consistently applied it in his works. In general, in printed publications at the turn of the 19th and 20th centuries, the Erzya alphabet does not differ significantly from the Russian alphabet (except for the presence of the Ҥ ҥ sign). The Mokshan alphabet, presented in the primers of 1892 and 1897, used a number of additional characters: ӑ for unstressed [a], я̈ for [ä] the front row of the lower rise, ы̃ for the relaxed reduced vowel of the middle row н before г and к. However, in other Mokshan publications of that time, as a rule, the standard Russian alphabet is used (in the «Священная история Ветхого завета» (Sacred History of the Old Testament) in 1898, the sign ԙ was used).

Differences between the alphabets of the primers of the late 19th - early 20th centuries from the modern alphabet:

- Mokshan
  - Primer for Mordovians-Moksha: 1st ed., 2nd ed. Kazan, 1892, 1897. There is no letter Ъъ. There are Ӑӑ, Іі, Ҥҥ, Ы̃ы̃, Я̈я̈ letters.
  - Dorofeev Z. F. Валда ян. Moscow, 1925. There is no letter Ъъ. There are Ԕԕ, Ԗԗ letters.
- Erzyan
  - The alphabet book for Mordovians is Erzi with the addition of prayers and the Russian alphabet. Kazan, 1884. There is no letter Щщ. There are Іі, Ѣѣ, Ѳѳ letters.
  - Primer for Erzya-Mordovians. Kazan, 1892. There are no letters Хх, Ъъ. There are Ii, Ҥҥ letters .
  - Тундонь чи. Эрзянь букварь. М.-Пг., 1923. There is no letter Ъъ. There is Ҥҥ letter.
  - Danilov T. Валдо чи. Moscow., 1926. There is no letter Ъъ.

=== After 1917 ===
Since 1920, active book publishing began in the Moksha and Erzya languages, newspapers began to appear. However, a single dialect base, and as a consequence, a standard alphabet and spelling, were still missing. In 1924, this problem was considered at the congress of Mordovian teachers, and in 1928 at the Moscow language conference. In the mid—1920s, the Moksha and Erzya publications began to develop uniform literary norms and a dialect base, which was completed by the mid-1930s. The Moksha literary language was based on the Krasnoslobodsk—Temnikov dialect, and the Erzyan language was based on the dialect of the village of Kozlovka.

In graphic terms, the process of the formation of the Mordovian writing system had the following features: from 1920 to 1924, the standard Russian alphabet was used without additional characters. The sound [ə] began to be denoted by the letter а, and [ä] by the letter е. In 1924, the letters ԕ and ԗ were introduced to convey specific voiceless consonants [ʟ] and [ʀ], and the letters э and ӭ were used for [ä], but the latter was canceled almost immediately. In the Moksha editions of 1924–1926, the letters ӗ, о̆ and ы̆ were sometimes used to denote [ə].

In 1927, all additional letters in the Moksha and Erzya alphabets were canceled and it took a modern form, graphically completely coinciding with the Russian alphabet. To designate [ʟ] and [ʀ] began to use letter combinations лх and рх (palatalized - льх, рьх), and for [ə], after non-palatalized consonants, the letter о and the letter е after palatalized. In 1993, new spelling rules of the Mokshan language were adopted, according to which the reduced [ə] is denoted at the beginning of a word and in the first closed syllable by the letter ъ.

=== Attempt to romanize ===
On March 25, 1932, as part of the all-Union process of romanization, the All-Union Central Committee of the New Alphabet adopted the Mordovian alphabet on a Latin basis. It included the following letters: A a, Ә ә, B в, C c, Ç ç, D d, Э э, E e, F f, G g, Ь ь, I i, J j, K k, L l, M m, N n, O o, Ө ө, P p, R r, S s, Ş ş, T t, U u, Y y, V v, X x, Z z, Ƶ ƶ, ȷ, Rx, Lh (the last two letters are only for the Mokshan language). On May 19, 1932, after discussion with local experts, the Lower Volga Committee of the New Alphabet adopted this alphabet in a slightly modified form: A a, B в, C c, Ç ç, D d, Ә ә, F f, G g, Y y, I i, J j, K k, L l, M m, N n, O o, P p, R r, S s, Ş ş, T t, U u, V v, X x, Z z, Ƶ ƶ, Ь ь, Rx, Lh. However, no real steps were taken to introduce the Mordovian Latinized alphabet and it did not receive development.

Correspondence of Latin letters to Cyrillic
Project 1	Project 2	Project 3	Cyrillic	Project 1	Project 2	Project 3	Cyrillic	Project 1	Project 2	Project 3	Cyrillic
A a			А а	I i			И и	Ş ş			Ш ш
Ә ә	Ja ja	Ä ä	Я я	J j			Й й	T t			Т т
B в			Б б	K k			К к	U u			У у
C c			Ц ц	L l			Л л	Y y	Ju ju	Ü ü	Ю ю
Ç ç			Ч ч	M m			М м	V v			В в
D d			Д д	N n			Н н	X x			Х х
Э э	Ә ә		Э э	O o			О о	Z z			З з
E e	Je je	E e	Е е	Ө ө	Jo jo	Ö ö	Ё ё	Ƶ ƶ			Ж ж
F f			Ф ф	P p			П п	ȷ	ь		ь
G g			Г г	R r			Р р	Rx rx			Рх рх
Ь ь	Y y		Ы ы	S s			С с	Lh lh		Lx lx	Лх лх

== Modern Mordovian alphabet ==
The modern Mordovian alphabet (for the Moksha and Erzyan languages) has been in effect since the late 1920s. Graphically, it completely coincides with the Russian alphabet.

А а	Б б	В в	Г г	Д д	Е е	Ё ё	Ж ж	З з	И и	Й й
К к	Л л	М м	Н н	О о	П п	Р р	С с	Т т	У у	Ф ф
Х х	Ц ц	Ч ч	Ш ш	Щ щ	Ъ ъ	Ы ы	Ь ь	Э э	Ю ю	Я я

Phonetic meaning of individual letters:

- А а — sound [a]. In Moksha also [ə] (at the end of a word after a solid stem).
- Е е — sound [e] after palatal consonants, as well as combination with the preceding й. In Moksha also [ə] (in the middle of a word after soft consonants and sibilants) and [j] + [ə].
- Ё ё — sound [o] after palatal consonants, as well as combination with the preceding й.
- И и — sound [i] after palatal and unpaired consonants.
- О о — sound [o]. In Moksha also [ə] (after hard consonants).
- Ъ ъ — in moksha language [ə] at the beginning of a word and the first closed syllable.
- Ы ы — sound [i] after hard consonants.
- Э э — in moksha language the sound [ä] at the beginning of a word.
- Ю ю — sound [u] after palatal consonants, as well as combination with the preceding й.
- Я я — sound [a] after palatal consonants, as well as combination with the preceding й. In moksha language also [ä] (in the middle and end of a word) and [j] + [ä].
- Palatalization is indicated by the letter ь after the consonant or by the letters е, ё, и, ю, я after the consonant.
- Mokshan voiceless voiceovers [ȷ], [ʟ], [ʀ] are designated by letter combinations йх, лх, рх.

== Bibliography ==
- Феоктистов, А. П. (2008). Очерки по истории формирования мордовских письменно-литературных языков (PDF) (1000 экз ed.). Саранск: Мордов. кн. изд-во. ISBN 978-5-7595-1753-5.
- Maticsák Sándor. (2012). A mordvin írásbeliség kezdetei [The beginnings of Mordvin writing] (PDF) (in Hungarian). Debrecen University Press. p. 278. ISBN 978-963-318-288-8.
