= Voiceless dental and alveolar lateral fricatives =

Consonantal sounds represented by ⟨ɬ⟩ in IPA

Voiceless alveolar lateral fricative

ɬ
- IPA number: 148

Audio sample
- source · help

Encoding
- Entity (decimal): &#620;
- Unicode (hex): U+026C
- X-SAMPA: K
- Braille: ⠦ (braille pattern dots-236) ⠇ (braille pattern dots-123)
Image

Voiceless dental lateral fricative

ɬ̪

Voiceless postalveolar lateral fricative

ɬ̠

Voiceless alveolar lateral approximant

l̥
- IPA number: 155 402A

Audio sample
- source · help

Encoding
- X-SAMPA: l_0

Voiceless velarized or pharyngealized alveolar lateral approximant

ɫ̥

l̥ˠ

l̥ˁ

Audio sample
- source · help

A voiceless alveolar lateral fricative is a type of consonantal sound, used in some spoken languages.

The symbol in the International Phonetic Alphabet that represents voiceless dental, alveolar, and postalveolar lateral fricatives is [ɬ]. The symbol [ɬ] is called "belted l" and is distinct from "l with tilde", [ɫ], which transcribes a different sound – the velarized (or pharynɡealized) alveolar lateral approximant, often called "dark L".

A voiceless alveolar lateral approximant is transcribed in IPA as ⟨l̥⟩. In Sino-Tibetan languages, Ladefoged & Maddieson (1996) argue that Burmese and Standard Tibetan have voiceless lateral approximants [l̥] and Li Fang-Kuei & William Baxter contrast apophonically the voiceless alveolar lateral approximant from its voiced counterpart in the reconstruction of Old Chinese. A voiceless dental or alveolar lateral approximant is found as an allophone of its voiced counterpart in British English and Philadelphia English after voiceless coronal and labial stops, and it is velarized before back vowels; the allophone of /l/ after /k/ is most commonly as a voiceless velar lateral approximant. See English phonology.

== Features ==
Features of a voiceless alveolar lateral fricative:

- Its manner of articulation is fricative, which means it is produced by constricting air flow through a narrow channel at the place of articulation, causing turbulence.
- Its place of articulation is alveolar, which means it is articulated with either the tip or the blade of the tongue at the alveolar ridge, termed respectively apical and laminal.
- Its phonation is voiceless, which means it is produced without vibrations of the vocal cords. In some languages the vocal cords are actively separated, so it is always voiceless; in others the cords are lax, so that it may take on the voicing of adjacent sounds.
- It is an oral consonant, which means that air is not allowed to escape through the nose.
- It is a lateral consonant, which means it is produced by directing the airstream over the sides of the tongue, rather than down the middle.
- Its airstream mechanism is pulmonic, which means it is articulated by pushing air only with the intercostal muscles and abdominal muscles, as in most speech sounds.

== Occurrence ==
Lateral fricatives are common among indigenous languages of western North America, such as Nahuatl, Tlingit and Navajo, and in North Caucasian languages, such as Avar. It is also found in African languages, such as Zulu, and Asian languages, such as Chukchi, some Yue dialects like Taishanese, the Hlai languages of Hainan, and several Formosan languages and dialects in Taiwan.

Lateral fricatives are rare in European languages outside the Caucasus, but it is found notably in Welsh, in which it is written ⟨ll⟩. Several Welsh names beginning with this sound (Llwyd [ɬʊɨd], Llywelyn [ɬəˈwɛlɨn]) have been borrowed into English and then retain the Welsh ⟨ll⟩ spelling but are pronounced with an /l/ (Lloyd, Llewellyn), or they are substituted with ⟨fl⟩ (pronounced /fl/) (Floyd, Fluellen). It was also found in certain dialects of Lithuanian Yiddish.

Modern South Arabian languages are known for their apparent archaic Semitic features, especially in their system of phonology. For example, they preserve the lateral fricatives *ś [ɬ] and *ṣ́/ḏ̣ [ɬʼ] of Proto-Semitic. Except for the Modern South Arabian languages, every other extant Semitic language has merged Proto-Semitic *s2 [ɬ] into one of the two other plain sibilants.

The phoneme /ɬ/ was reconstructed for the most ancient Hebrew speech of the Ancient Israelites. The orthography of Biblical Hebrew, however, did not directly indicate it. It is, however, attested by later developments: /ɬ/ was written with ⟨ש⟩, but the letter was also used for the sound /ʃ/. Later, /ɬ/ merged with /s/, a sound that had been written only with ⟨ס⟩. As a result, three etymologically distinct modern Hebrew phonemes can be distinguished: /s/ written ⟨ס⟩, /ʃ/ written ⟨ש⟩ (with later niqqud pointing שׁ), and /s/ evolving from /ɬ/ and written ⟨ש⟩ (with later niqqud pointing שׂ). The specific pronunciation of ⟨ש⟩ evolving to /s/ from [ɬ] is known based on comparative evidence since /ɬ/ is the corresponding Proto-Semitic phoneme and is still attested in Modern South Arabian languages, and early borrowings indicate it from Ancient Hebrew (e.g. balsam < Greek balsamon < Hebrew baśam). The phoneme /ɬ/ began to merge with /s/ in Late Biblical Hebrew, as is indicated by interchange of orthographic ⟨ש⟩ and ⟨ס⟩, possibly under the influence of Aramaic, and became the rule in Mishnaic Hebrew. In all Jewish reading traditions, /ɬ/ and /s/ have merged completely, but in Samaritan Hebrew /ɬ/ has instead merged into /ʃ/.

A [ɬ] sound is also found in two of the constructed languages invented by J. R. R. Tolkien, Sindarin (inspired by Welsh, which has the sound) and Quenya (even though this language was mostly inspired by Finnish, Ancient Greek, and Latin, none of which have this sound). In Sindarin, it is written as ⟨lh⟩ initially and ⟨ll⟩ medially and finally, and in Quenya, it appears only initially and is written ⟨hl⟩.

=== Dental or denti-alveolar ===
Language		Word	IPA	Meaning	Notes
Amis	Kangko dialect	tipid	[tipiɬ̪]	'bowl'	Allophonic variation of word-final and sometimes word-initial /ɮ̪/.
Mapudungun		kagüḻ	[kɜˈɣɘɬ̪͆]	'phlegm that is spit'	Interdental; possible utterance-final allophone of /l̪/.
Norwegian	Trondheim dialect	sælt	[s̪aɬ̪t̪]	'sold'	Laminal denti-alveolar; allophone of /l/. Also described as an approximant. See Norwegian phonology
Sahaptin		[ɬqʼɑm]		'moccasins'	Contrasts approximant /l/.

=== Alveolar ===
Language		Word	IPA	Meaning	Notes
Adyghe		плъыжь / پ‍‍ݪ‍‍‍ہ‍ژ / płəź	[pɬəʑ]	'red'	
Ahtna		dzeł	[d͡zɛɬ]	'mountain'	
Avar		лъабго / ڸ‍‍ابگۈ / ļabgo	[ˈɬabɡo]	'three'	
Basay		lanum	[ɬanum]	'water'	
Berber	Ait Seghrouchen	altu	[æˈɬʊw]	'not yet'	Allophone of /lt/.
Brahui		تی‍‍ڷ / teļ	[t̪eːɬ]	'scorpion'	Contrasts /ɬ/ with /l/.
Bunun	Isbukun dialect	ludun	[ɬuɗun]	'mountain'	Voiceless allophone of /l/ among some speakers.
Central Alaskan Yup'ik		talliq	[taɬeq]	'arm'	
Cherokee	Oklahoma Cherokee	kiihli	[ɡiːɬí]	'dog'	An alternative pronunciation of the voiceless alveolar lateral approximant [l̥], a realization of the cluster /hl/.
Chickasaw		lhipa	[ɬipa]	'it is dry'	
Chinese	Taishanese	三	[ɬäm˧]	'three'	Corresponds to [s] in Standard Cantonese
Chinese	Pinghua	三	[ɬäm˧]	'three'	
Chinese	Pu-Xian Min	沙	[ɬua˥˧˧]	'sand'	
Chipewyan		łue	[ɬue]	'fish'	
Chukchi		[p(ə)ɬekət]		'shoes'	
Dahalo		[ɬunno]		'stew'	Contrasts palatal /𝼆/ and labialized /ɬʷ/.
Damin		l*i	[ɬ↓ʔi]	'fish'	Ingressive with egressive glottalic release
Deg Xinag		xindigixidiniłan'	[xintikixitiniɬʔanʔ]	'she is teaching them'	
Dogrib		ło	[ɬo]	'smoke'	Contrasts voiced /ɮ/.
Eyak		qeł	[qʰɛʔɬ]	'woman'	Contrasts approximant /l/.
Fali		[paɬkan]		'shoulder'	
Forest Nenets		хару	[xaɬʲu]	'rain'	Contrasts palatalized /ɬʲ/.
Greenlandic		illu	[iɬːu]	'house'	Realization of underlying geminate /l/. See Greenlandic phonology
Hadza		sleme	[ɬeme]	'man'	
Haida		tla'únhl	[tɬʰʌʔʊ́nɬ]	'six'	
Halkomelem		ɬ'eqw	[ɬeqw]	'wet'	Attested in at least the Musqueam dialect.
Hla'alua		lhatenge	[ɬɑtɨŋɨ]	'vegetable'	
Hlai		[ɬa⁵³~ɬa³³]		'fish'	Contrasts voiced approximant /l/.
Hmong		𖬃𖬥 / hli	[ɬi˧]	'moon'	
Inuktitut		ᐊᒃᖤᒃ akłak	[akɬak]	'grizzly bear'	See Inuit phonology
Kabardian		лъы / ݪ‍‍‍ہ‍ / ły	[ɬə]	'blood'	Contrasts voiced /ɮ/ and glottalic /ɬʼ/.
Kaska		tsį̄ł	[tsʰĩːɬ]	'axe'	
Kham	Gamale Kham	ह्ला	[ɬɐ]	'leaf'	
Khroskyabs		ɬ-sá	[ɬsá]	'kill' (causative)	
Lillooet		lhésp	[ɬə́sp]	'rash'	
Lushootseed		łukʷał	[ɬukʷaɬ]	'sun'	
Mapudungun		kaül	[kɜˈɘɬ]	'a different song'	Possible utterance-final allophone of /l/.
Mehri		ڛ‍‍خوف	[ɬxoːf]	'milk'	Contrasts with /ɬˀ/, /s/ and /ʃ/.
Moloko		sla	[ɬa]	'cow'	
Mongolian		лхагва lhagbha	[ˈɬaw̜ɐk]	'Wednesday'	Only in loanwords from Tibetan; here from ལྷག་པ (lhag-pa)
Muscogee		páɬko	[pəɬko]	'grape'	
Nahuatl		āltepētl	[aːɬˈtɛpɛːt͡ɬ]	'city'	Allophone of /l/
Navajo		łaʼ	[ɬaʔ]	'some'	See Navajo phonology
Nisga'a		hloḵs	[ɬoqs]	'sun'	
Norwegian	Trøndersk	tatlete	[ˈtɑɬɑt]	'weak', 'small'	Contrasts alveolar approximant /l/, apical postalveolar approximant /ɭ/, and laminal postalveolar approximant /l̠/.
Nuosu		ꆭ hlu	[ɬv̩̄ʷ]	'to fry'	Contrasts approximant /l/.
Nuxalk		plht	[p(ʰ)ɬtʰ]	'thick'	Contrasts with /t͡ɬʼ/ and /l/.
Saanich		ȽEL	[ɬəl]	'splash'	
Sandawe		lhaa	[ɬáː]	'goat'	
Sassarese		morthu	[ˈmoɬtu]	'dead'	
Sawi		ڷ‍‍و	[ɬo]	'three'	Contrasts approximant /l/. Developed from earlier *tr- consonant cluster.
Shehri		ع‍‍ݜ‍‍رت	[ʕəɬɛret]	'ten'	Contrasts with /ɬˀ/, /s/ and /ʃ/.
Shuswap		ɬept	[ɬept]	'fire is out'	
Sotho		ho hlahloba	[ho ɬɑɬɔbɑ]	'to examine'	See Sotho phonology
Soqotri		ڛ‍‍يبب	[ɬiːbɛb]	'old'	Contrasts with /ɬˀ/, /s/ and /ʃ/.
Swedish	Jämtlandic	kallt	[kaɬt]	'cold'	Also occurs in dialects in Dalarna and Härjedalen. See Swedish phonology
Swedish	Västerbotten dialect	behl	[beɬː]	'bridle'	
Taos		łiwéna	[ɬìˈwēnæ]	'wife'	See Taos phonology
Tera		tleebi	[ɬè̞ːbi]	'side'	
Thao		kilhpul	[kiɬpul]	'star'	
Tlingit		lingít	[ɬɪ̀nkɪ́t]	'Tlingit'	
Trumai		atle	[aɬe]	'mother'	
Toda		[kaɬ]		'to learn'	Contrasts /l ɬ ɭ ɭ̊˔ (ꞎ)/.
Ukrainian	Poltava subdialect	молоко	[mɔɬɔˈkɔ]	'milk'	Occurs only in Poltava subdialect of Central Dniprovian dialect.
Tsez		лъи łi	[ɬi]	'water'	
Vietnamese	Gin dialect	小	[ɬiu˧]	'small'	
Welsh		tegell	[ˈtɛɡɛɬ]	'kettle'	See Welsh phonology
Xhosa		sihlala	[síˈɬaːla]	'we stay'	
Yurok		kerhl	[kɚɬ]	'earring'	
Zulu		ihlahla	[iɬaɬa]	'twig'	Contrasts voiced /ɮ/.
Zuni		asdemła	[ʔastemɬan]	'ten'	

=== Alveolar approximant ===
Language		Word	IPA	Meaning	Notes
Aleut	Western Aleut	hlax̂	[l̥aχ]	'boy'	Contrasts with voiced /l/. Merged in Eastern Aleut.
Burmese		လှ	[l̥a̰]	'beautiful'	Contrasts with voiced /l/.
Danish	Standard	plads	[ˈpl̥æs]	'square'	Before /l/, aspiration of /p, t, k/ is realized as devoicing of /l/. See Danish phonology
English	Cardiff	plus	[pl̥ʌ̝s]	'plus'	See English phonology
English	Norfolk	plus	[pl̥ʌ̝s]	'plus'	See English phonology
Estonian		mahl	[mɑ̝hːl̥]	'juice'	Word-final allophone of /l/ after /t, s, h/. See Estonian phonology
Faroese		hjálpa	[jɔl̥pa]	'to help'	Allophone of /l/ before fortis plosives.
French		peuple	[pœpl̥]	'people'	Devoiced allophone of /l/, occurs after voiceless obstruents. Often gains voicing midway.
Iaai		[l̥iʈ]		'black'	Contrasts with voiced /l/.
Icelandic		hlaða	[l̥aːða]	'barn'	Realisation of underlying /hl/. Allophone of /l/ before fortis plosives and utterance finally. In free variation with the globaly more common fricative.
Kildin Sámi		тоӆсэ	[ˈtol̥sɛ]	'to keep the flame alive'	Contrasts with /l/, /l̥ʲ/, /lʲ/, and /ʎ/.
Northern Sámi	Eastern Inland	bálkká	[pæl̥kæ]	'salary'	Allophone of underlying cluster /lh/.
Pipil					Contrasted voiced /l/ in some now-extinct dialects.
Scottish Gaelic		sgailc	[s̪kal̥çkʲ]	'blow, knock'	Allophone of /l/ before a pre-aspirated plosive.
Southern Nambikwara		[haˈlawl̥u]		'cane toad'	Allophonic variation of /l/.
Tibetan		ལྷ་ས། Lhasa	[l̥asa]	'Lhasa'	
Ukrainian	Standard	смисл	[s̪mɪs̪l̥]	'sense'	Word-final allophone of /l/ after voiceless consonants. See Ukrainian phonology
Xumi	Lower	[ʁul̥o˦]		'head'	
Xumi	Upper	[bə˦l̥ä̝˦]		'to open a lock'	Described as an approximant. Contrasts with the voiced /l/.

=== Velarized dental or alveolar approximant ===
Language		Word	IPA	Meaning	Notes
English	Some Philadelphia speakers	plus	[pɫ̥ɯs]	'plus'	See English phonology
Georgian					Allophonic
Irish Gaelic					Phonemic
Ket					Allophonic
Moksha		калхт	[kal̥ˠt]	'fish'	Phonemic, but may be [ɬˠ] instead
Russian					Allophonic
Scottish Gaelic		falt	[fɑl̪̊ˠt̪]	'hair'	Allophone of /l̪ˠ/ before a pre-aspirated plosive or in word-final position.
Sámi	Ter				Phonemic
Turkish		yol	[ˈjo̞ɫ̟̊]	'way'	Devoiced allophone of velarized dental /ɫ/, frequent finally and before voiceless consonants. See Turkish phonology

== Voiceless lateral–median fricative ==
Voiceless alveolar lateral–median fricative

ʪ

θ̠ˡ

Audio sample
- source · help
Image

Voiceless dental lateral–median fricative

ʪ̪

θˡ

A voiceless alveolar lateral–median fricative (also known as a "lisp" fricative) is a consonantal sound pronounced with simultaneous lateral and central airflow.

=== Features ===
- Its manner of articulation is fricative, which means it is produced by constricting air flow through a narrow channel at the place of articulation, causing turbulence. However, it does not have the grooved tongue and directed airflow, or the high frequencies, of a sibilant.
- Its place of articulation is alveolar, which means it is articulated with either the tip or the blade of the tongue at the alveolar ridge, termed respectively apical and laminal.
- Its phonation is voiceless, which means it is produced without vibrations of the vocal cords. In some languages the vocal cords are actively separated, so it is always voiceless; in others the cords are lax, so that it may take on the voicing of adjacent sounds.
- It is an oral consonant, which means that air is not allowed to escape through the nose.
- It is a median consonant, which means it is produced by directing the airstream down the midline of the tongue, rather than to the sides.
- It is a lateral consonant, which means it is produced by directing the airstream over the sides of the tongue, rather than down the middle.
- Its airstream mechanism is pulmonic, which means it is articulated by pushing air only with the intercostal muscles and abdominal muscles, as in most speech sounds.

=== Occurrence ===
Language		Word	IPA	Meaning	Notes
Arabic	Al-Rubūʽah dialect	اَلْ‍‍ضَ‍‍يْمْ	[aθˡˁːajm]	'anguish'	Classical Arabic [ɮˁ] and Modern Standard Arabic [dˤ]
Arabic	[dialect missing]	ظَ‍‍امِئ	[ʪæːmiː]	'thirsty'	Classical and Modern Standard Arabic [ðˤ]
English	Lateral lisp	send	[ʪɛnd]	'send'	Occurs as a replacement for /s/

== Capital letter ==
Capital letter L with belt

Since the IPA letter "ɬ" has been adopted into the standard orthographies for many native North American languages, a capital letter L with belt "Ɬ" was requested by academics and added to the Unicode Standard version 7.0 in 2014 at U+A7AD. This is distinct from the small capital ⟨𝼄⟩ used for a voiceless velar lateral fricative.

== See also ==
- Voiced dental and alveolar lateral fricatives
- Voiceless alveolar lateral affricate
- Index of phonetics articles

== Notes ==
Place →	Labial					Coronal										Dorsal					Laryngeal			
Manner ↓	Bilabial		Labiodental		Linguolabial		Dental		Alveolar		Postalveolar		Retroflex		(Alveolo-)palatal		Velar		Uvular		Pharyngeal/epiglottal		Glottal	
Nasal	m̥	m	ɱ̊	ɱ		n̼	n̪̊	n̪	n̥	n	n̠̊	n̠	ɳ̊	ɳ	ɲ̊	ɲ	ŋ̊	ŋ	ɴ̥	ɴ				
Plosive	p	b	p̪	b̪	t̼	d̼	t̪	d̪	t	d			ʈ	ɖ	c	ɟ	k	ɡ	q	ɢ	ʡ		ʔ	
Sibilant affricate							t̪s̪	d̪z̪	ts	dz	t̠ʃ	d̠ʒ	tʂ	dʐ	tɕ	dʑ								
Non-sibilant affricate	pɸ	bβ	p̪f	b̪v			t̪θ	d̪ð	tɹ̝̊	dɹ̝	t̠ɹ̠̊˔	d̠ɹ̠˔			cç	ɟʝ	kx	ɡɣ	qχ	ɢʁ	ʡʜ	ʡʢ	ʔh	
Sibilant fricative							s̪	z̪	s	z	ʃ	ʒ	ʂ	ʐ	ɕ	ʑ								
Non-sibilant fricative	ɸ	β	f	v	θ̼	ð̼	θ	ð	θ̠	ð̠	ɹ̠̊˔	ɹ̠˔	ɻ̊˔	ɻ˔	ç	ʝ	x	ɣ	χ	ʁ	ħ	ʕ	h	ɦ
Approximant		β̞		ʋ				ð̞		ɹ		ɹ̠		ɻ		j		ɰ						˷
Tap/flap		ⱱ̟		ⱱ					ɾ̥	ɾ			ɽ̊	ɽ						ɢ̆		ʡ̆		
Trill	ʙ̥	ʙ							r̥	r		r̠	ɽ̊r̥	ɽr					ʀ̥	ʀ	ʜ	ʢ		
Lateral affricate									tɬ	dɮ			tꞎ	d𝼅	c𝼆	ɟʎ̝	k𝼄	ɡʟ̝						
Lateral fricative							ɬ̪		ɬ	ɮ			ꞎ	𝼅	𝼆	ʎ̝	𝼄	ʟ̝						
Lateral approximant								l̪	l̥	l		l̠	ɭ̊	ɭ	ʎ̥	ʎ	ʟ̥	ʟ		ʟ̠				
Lateral tap/flap									ɺ̥	ɺ			𝼈̊	𝼈		ʎ̆		ʟ̆						

		BL	LD	D	A	PA	RF	P	V	U
Implosive	Voiced	ɓ			ɗ		ᶑ	ʄ	ɠ	ʛ
Implosive	Voiceless	ɓ̥			ɗ̥		ᶑ̊	ʄ̊	ɠ̊	ʛ̥
Ejective	Stop	pʼ			tʼ		ʈʼ	cʼ	kʼ	qʼ
Ejective	Affricate		p̪fʼ	tθʼ	tsʼ	tʃʼ	tʂʼ	tɕʼ	kxʼ	qχʼ
Ejective	Fricative	ɸʼ	fʼ	θʼ	sʼ	ʃʼ	ʂʼ	ɕʼ	xʼ	χʼ
Ejective	Lateral affricate				tɬʼ			c𝼆ʼ	k𝼄ʼ	q𝼄ʼ
Ejective	Lateral fricative				ɬʼ					
Click (top: velar; bottom: uvular)	Tenuis	kʘ qʘ		kǀ qǀ	kǃ qǃ		k𝼊 q𝼊	kǂ qǂ		
Click (top: velar; bottom: uvular)	Voiced	ɡʘ ɢʘ		ɡǀ ɢǀ	ɡǃ ɢǃ		ɡ𝼊 ɢ𝼊	ɡǂ ɢǂ		
Click (top: velar; bottom: uvular)	Nasal	ŋʘ ɴʘ		ŋǀ ɴǀ	ŋǃ ɴǃ		ŋ𝼊 ɴ𝼊	ŋǂ ɴǂ	ʞ	
Click (top: velar; bottom: uvular)	Tenuis lateral				kǁ qǁ					
Click (top: velar; bottom: uvular)	Voiced lateral				ɡǁ ɢǁ					
Click (top: velar; bottom: uvular)	Nasal lateral				ŋǁ ɴǁ					
