= U with double acute =

U with double acute may refer to:

- U with double acute (Cyrillic) (Ӳ, ӳ), a Chuvash letter, regarded as a separate letter from У
- U with double acute accent (Ű, ű), a Hungarian letter, regarded as a separate letter from U
