= Yery with breve =

Cyrillic letter

- Ы̆ ы̆

Usage
- Writing system: Cyrillic
- Type: Alphabetic

Yery with breve or Short Yery(Ы̆ ы̆; italics: Ы̆ ы̆) is a letter of the Cyrillic script.

Yery with breve was used in the Mari language and the Mordvin language Moksha. In Mari, it was introduced in either 1889 or 1893 and was replaced by Ӹ ӹ (Yery with diaeresis) in 1929. In Moksha, it, alongside ye with breve and o with breve, was used to represent the mid central vowel or schwa from 1924 until 1926.

== See also ==
- Cyrillic characters in Unicode
