= U with diaeresis =

U with diaeresis may refer to:

- U with diaeresis (Cyrillic) (Ӱ, ӱ), an Altai, Khakas, Khanty, Mari and Shor letter also used in the Komi-Yodzyak language
- Ü or ü, used in a variety of ways (frequently represented as ue in languages lacking the glyph):
  - in Azerbaijani, Catalan, Estonian, French, Galician, German, Occitan, Spanish, not considered a separate letter
  - in Hungarian, Karelian, Turkish, Uyghur Latin, Estonian, Azeri, Turkmen, Crimean Tatar, Kazakh Latin and Tatar Latin alphabets, considered a distinct letter and collated separately
  - a letter in the Chinese Romanisations pinyin and Wade–Giles, and the German-based Lessing-Othmer
