= C with breve =

Letter of the Latin alphabet

- C̆ c̆

Usage
- Writing system: Latin script
- Type: alphabetic
- Sound values: [ʈʂ]
- In Unicode: U+0043, U+0063, U+0306

History
Development
T14
  - 𐤂
    - Γ γ
      - 𐌂
        - C c
          - C̆ c̆
- Transliterations: Ҽ ҽ

C with breve (C̆, c̆) is an additional letter in Latin script used in the romanisation ISO 9, to transliterate the Cyrillic letter Abkhazian Che (Ҽ ҽ).

== Unicode ==
This letter does not have a simple precomposed character encoding in Unicode. It is encoded using U+0043 C LATIN CAPITAL LETTER C (or U+0063 c LATIN SMALL LETTER C) in combination with the combining diacritic U+0306 ◌̆ COMBINING BREVE.

== See also ==
- C with caron (Č)
