= U with double acute (Cyrillic) =

Cyrillic letter used for /y/ in Chuvash

- Ӳ ӳ

Usage
- Writing system: Cyrillic
- Type: Alphabetic
- Language of origin: Chuvash
- Sound values: /y/
- In Unicode: U+04F2, U+04F3

U with double acute (Ӳ ӳ; italics: Ӳ ӳ) is a letter of the Cyrillic script, derived from the Cyrillic letter U (У у У у).

U with double acute is only used in the Chuvash language, where it represents the close front rounded vowel /y/, the pronunciation of the Latin letter U with umlaut (Ü ü) in German. It is placed between ⟨У⟩ and ⟨Ф⟩ in the Chuvash alphabet. It is usually romanized as ⟨Ü⟩ but its ISO 9 transliteration is ⟨Ű⟩.

It was also formerly used in the Altai alphabet of 1840.

== Computing codes ==
Character information
Preview	Ӳ		ӳ	
Unicode name	CYRILLIC CAPITAL LETTER; U WITH DOUBLE ACUTE		CYRILLIC SMALL LETTER; U WITH DOUBLE ACUTE	
Encodings	decimal	hex	dec	hex
Unicode	1266	U+04F2	1267	U+04F3
UTF-8	211 178	D3 B2	211 179	D3 B3
Numeric character reference	&#1266;	&#x4F2;	&#1267;	&#x4F3;

== See also ==
- Ӱ ӱ : Cyrillic letter U with diaeresis
- Ү ү : Cyrillic letter Ue
- Ű ű : Latin letter U with double acute - a Hungarian letter
