= Chuvash language =

Oghur Turkic language

Chuvash
- Чӑваш чӗлхи Çăvaş çĕlhi Чӑвашла Çăvaşla
- Pronunciation: [tɕəʋaʃˈla]
- Native to: Russia
- Region: Volga-Ural region (esp. Chuvashia)
- Ethnicity: 1.05 million Chuvash (2020 census)
- Native speakers: 740,000 (2020 census)
- Language family: Turkic: Oghuric; Chuvash
- Early form: Volga Bulgar ?
- Writing system: Cyrillic

Official status
- Official language in: Chuvashia (Russia)

Language codes
- ISO 639-1: cv
- ISO 639-2: chv
- ISO 639-3: chv
- Glottolog: chuv1255
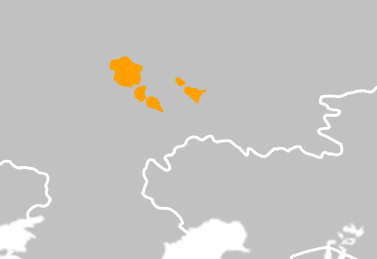
- Chuvash native speaker distribution

- Chuvash is classified as Vulnerable by the UNESCO Atlas of the World's Languages in Danger

Chuvash (UK: /ˈtʃuːvɑːʃ/ CHOO-vahsh, US: /tʃʊˈvɑːʃ/ chuu-VAHSH; Чӑваш чӗлхи, translit. Çăvaş çĕlhi, IPA: [tɕəʋaʃ tɕølɣi], Чӑвашла, translit. Çăvaşla, IPA: [tɕəʋaʃˈla]) (Note: Also known as Chăvash, Chuwash, Chovash, Chavash, Çovaş, Çuvaş or Çuwaş.) is a Turkic language spoken in Volga-Ural region of Russia, primarily in the Chuvash Republic and adjacent areas. It is the only surviving member of the Oghur branch of Turkic languages, one of the two principal branches of the Turkic family.

The writing system for the Chuvash language is based on the Cyrillic script, employing all of the letters used in the Russian alphabet and adding four letters of its own: Ӑ, Ӗ, Ҫ and Ӳ.

== Distribution ==
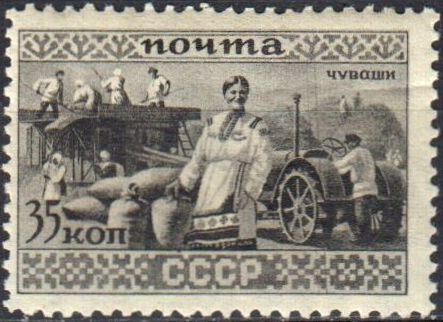
Stamp of the Soviet Union, Chuvash people, 1933

Chuvash is the native language of the Chuvash people and an official language of Chuvashia. There are contradictory numbers regarding the number of people able to speak Chuvash nowadays; some sources claim it is spoken by 1,640,000 persons in Russia and another 34,000 in other countries and that 86% of ethnic Chuvash and 8% of the people of other ethnicities living in Chuvashia claimed knowledge of Chuvash language during the 2002 census. However, other sources claim that the number of Chuvash speakers is on the decline, with a drop from 1 million speakers in 2010 to 700,000 in 2021; observers suggest this is due to Moscow having a lack of interest in preserving the language diversity in Russia. Although Chuvash is taught at schools and sometimes used in the media, it is considered endangered by the UNESCO, because Russian dominates in most spheres of life and few children learning the language are likely to become active users.

A fairly significant production and publication of literature in Chuvash still continues. According to UNESCO's Index Translationum, at least 202 books translated from Chuvash were published in other languages (mostly Russian) since ca. 1979. However, as with most other languages of the former USSR, most of the translation activity took place before the dissolution of the USSR: out of the 202 translations, 170 books were published in the USSR and just 17, in the post-1991 Russia (mostly, in the 1990s). A similar situation takes place with the translation of books from other languages (mostly Russian) into Chuvash (the total of 175 titles published since ca. 1979, but just 18 of them in post-1991 Russia).

== Classification ==
Chuvash is the most distinctive of the Turkic languages and cannot be understood by other Turkic speakers, whose languages have varying degrees of mutual intelligibility within their respective subgroups. Chuvash is classified, alongside the long-extinct Bulgar, as a member of the Oghuric branch of the Turkic language family, or equivalently, the sole surviving descendant of West Old Turkic. Since the surviving literary records for the non-Chuvash members of Oghuric (Bulgar and possibly Khazar) are scant, the exact position of Chuvash within the Oghuric family cannot be determined.

Despite grammatical similarity with the rest of Turkic language family, the presence of changes in Chuvash pronunciation (which are hard to reconcile with other members of the Turkic family) has led some scholars to see Chuvash as originating not from Proto-Turkic but from another proto-language spoken at the time of Proto-Turkic (in which case Chuvash and all the remaining Turkic languages would be part of a larger language family).

The Oghuric branch is distinguished from the rest of the Turkic family (the Common Turkic languages) by two sound changes: r corresponding to Common Turkic z (rhotacism) and l corresponding to Common Turkic š (lambdacism). The first scientific fieldwork description of Chuvash, by August Ahlqvist in 1856, allowed researchers to establish its proper affiliation.

Some scholars suggest Hunnish had strong ties with Chuvash and classify Chuvash as separate Hunno-Bulgar. However, such speculations are not based on proper linguistic evidence, since the language of the Huns is almost unknown except for a few attested words and personal names. Scholars generally consider Hunnish as unclassifiable.

Chuvash is so divergent from the main body of Turkic languages that Chuvash was first believed to be a Turkified Finno-Ugric language, or an intermediate branch between Turkic and Mongolic languages. Conversely, other scholars today regard it as an Oghuric language significantly influenced by the Finno-Ugric languages.

The following sound changes and resulting sound correspondences are typical:

Sound change from Proto-Turkic	Example of sound correspondence
*/ɾʲ/ > r	хӗр (hĕr) : Turkish kız 'girl'
*/lʲ/ > l, but occasionally /lʲ/ > ś	кӗмӗл (kӗmӗl) : Turkish kümüş 'silver' хӗвел (hĕvel) : Tatar qoyaš 'sun' хӗл (hĕl) : Turkish kış ‘winter’ пуҫ (puş) : Turkish baş ‘head’
*y > ǰ > č > ś	ҫул (şul) : Turkish yol ‘road’
*-n > -m	тӗтӗм (tĕtĕm) : Turkish tütün ‘smoke’
*-ŋ > -n (sometimes -m)	ҫӗнӗ (şĕnĕ) : Yakut саҥа, Turkish yeni 'new' (< Proto-Turkic *yaŋï, yeŋi)
*-d > -ð > -z > -r	ура (ura) : Tuvan адак, Turkish ayak (< Proto-Turkic *adak) ‘foot’
*[q] (i.e. */k/ in back environments) > χ But dropped before later *y	хура (hura) : Turkish kara 'black' юн (jun) : Turkish kan 'blood' (Proto-Turkic *qaːn > Oguric *χaːn > *χyan > *yån)
*-/k/ (both -[q] or -[k]) finally in disyllabic stems: > g > γ > ∅	пулӑ (pulă) : Turkish balık 'fish' ĕне (ĕne) : Turkish inek 'cow' ура (ura) : Turkish ayak 'foot'
*-g > *-w > -v, -∅ (also via monophthongisation)	ту (tu) : Turkish dağ 'mountain', тив (tiv) : Turkish değ 'touch', вӗрен (vĕren) : Turkish öğren 'learn', аллӑ (allă) : Turkish elli (< Proto-Turkic *ellig, ellüg)
*s > š occasionally (due to a following *y?)	шыв (šyv) : Old Turkic sub, Turkish su 'water'
*b- > p-	пӗр (pĕr) : Turkish bir 'one'
*-b > *-w > -v	шыв (šyv) : Old Turkic sub, Turkish su 'water'
*t in palatal environments > č	чӗр (çĕr) : Turkish diz 'knee'
diphthongisation of long vowels producing /yV/ and /vV/ sequences (but not in all relevant lexemes); e.g.: *ā > ja *ō > *wo > vu *ȫ, ǖ > *üwä > ăva	ят (jat) : Turkmen at, Turkish ad 'name' (< Proto-Turkic *āt) вут (vut) : Turkmen ot, Turkish od 'fire' (< Proto-Turkic *ōt) тӑват (tăvat): Turkish dört (< Proto-Turkic *tȫrt)
reduction and centralisation of high vowels: *u > ă; *ï > ă or ĕ *i, *ü > ĕ	тӑр (tăr) : Turkish dur 'stand' хӗр (hĕr) : Turkish kız 'girl' пӗр (pĕr) : Turkish bir 'one', кӗл (kĕl): Turkish kül 'ash'
*a > *å > o > u (the latter only in the Anatri dialect, on which the standard is based); but also (the determining circumstances are unclear): *a > ï	ут (ut) : Turkish at 'horse' ҫыр (şyr) : Turkish yaz 'write'
raising of most other low vowels: *ẹ > i, *o > u, *ö > ü	кил (kil) : Turkish gel 'come', утӑ (utӑ) : Turkish ot 'grass'
*e (i.e. *ä) > a	кас (kas) : Turkish kes 'cut'
Allophonic rules: voicing between voiced segments, palatalisation of consonants in palatal environments, leftward stress retraction from reduced vowels	See Phonology section.

Most of the (non-allophonic) consonant changes listed in the table above are thought to date from the period before the Bulgars migrated to the Volga region in the 10th century; some notable exceptions are the č > ś shift and the final stage of the -d > -ð > -z > -r shift, which date from the following, Volga Bulgar period (between the 10th-century migration and the Mongol invasions of the 13th century). The vowel changes mostly occurred later, mainly during the Middle Chuvash period (between the invasions and the 17th century), except for the diphthongisation, which took place during the Volga Bulgar period. Many sound changes known from Chuvash can be observed in Turkic loanwords into Hungarian (from the pre-migration period) and in Volga Bulgar epitaphs or loanwords into languages of the Volga region (from the Volga Bulgar period). Nevertheless, these sources also indicate that there was significant dialectal variation within the Oguric-speaking population during both of these periods.

=== Comparison ===
In the 8–10th centuries in Central Asia, the ancient Turkic script (the Orkhon-Yenisei runic script) was used for writing in Turkic languages. Turkic epitaphs of 7–9th centuries AD were left by speakers of various dialects (table):

- Often in the Chuvash language, the Common Turkic sounds of /j/ (Oghuz), /d/ (Karluk), /z/ (Kipchak) are replaced by /r/, example rhotacism:

Words for "leg" and "put" in various Turkic languages:

j - languages (Oguz): ayaq, qoy-

d - languages (Karluk): adaq, qod-

z - languages (Kypchak): azaq, qoz-

r - languages (Oghur): ura, hur- (dial. ora, hor-)

- Often in the Chuvash language, the Turkic sound /q/ is replaced by /x/, example hitaism:

Comparison table

Сhitacism (Q > H)

English word	Oghuz / Kipchak	Chuvash (Up.)	Chuvash (Low.)
black	qara	hura	hora
goose	qaz	hur	hor
girl	qız	hĕr	hĕr
zucchini	qabaq	hupah	hopah

- Turkic sound -y- (oguz) and -j- (kipchaks) is replaced by chuvash -ş-, example:

Words in Turkic languages: egg, snake, rain, house, earth

Oguz: yumurta, yılan, yağmur, yurt, yer (turk., azerb.)

Kipchaks: jumırtqa, jılan, jañğır, jurt, jer (kyrgyz., kazakh.)

Chuvash: şămarta, şĕlen, şămăr, şurt, şĕr

- In the field of vowels, we observe the following correspondences: the common Turkic -a- in the first syllable of the word in Chuvash correspond to -u- and -o-.

Comparison table

English word	Oguz / Kipchak	Chuvash (Up.)	Chuvash (Low.)
horse	at	ut	ot
coin	aqça	ukşa	okşa
head	baš	puş	poş
step	adım	utăm	otăm

In modern times, in Chuvash [a] remains, Tatar "kapka" ~ Chuvash "hapha" (gate), when there should be a "hupha" from the root "hup - close".

- In the field of vowels, G. F. Miller observes another example when -u- is replaced by -wu- or -wă-

Comparison table

English word	Kipchak	Chuvash (Upper)	Oguz	Chuvash (Lower)
fire	ut	wut	ot	wot
ten	un	wun	on	won
forest	urman	wărman	orman	wărman
Russian	urus	wırăs	orus	wırăs
he	ul	wăl	ol	wăl
thirty	utyz	wătăr	otyz	wătăr

- The fricative -g- in some words in Chuvash corresponds to -v-

Comparison table

English word	Oghuz	Chuvash
native	doğan	tăvan
tree	ağaç	jıvăş
mountain	dağ	tuv

Ogur and Oguz

It is well known that the Oghuz group of Turkic languages differs from the Kipchak in that the word “I” was pronounced by the Oghuzes and Oghurs in ancient times by "bä(n)", and the rest of the Turks - by "män". There is such a difference in the modern Turkic languages of the Volga region:

Volga Tatar	Chuvash	Oghuz	Translation	Notes
min	эпӗ(н)	ben	I, me	
meñ	пин	biŋ	thousand	
miləş	пилеш		rowan	
məçe	пӗҫи, пиҫук	pişik	cat	
miçəw	пичев		buckle	

tat., bash. Min, ogur/chuv. Epĕn (< *pen), turk. Ben, eng. «I am»;

tat., bash. Mең, ogur/chuv. Piń, turk. Bin, eng. «thousand»;

tat., bash. Milәş, ogur/chuv. Pileš, eng. «rowan»;

tat. Мәçe, ogur/chuv. Pĕşi, Pĕşuk, az. Pişik, eng. «cat»;

Bashkir: Мисәү, romanized: Misəw, Chuvash: Пичев, romanized: Piçev, lit. 'buckle'

== Phonology ==
=== Consonants ===
The consonants are the following (the corresponding Cyrillic letters are in brackets): The stops, sibilants and affricates are voiceless and fortis but become lenis (sounding similar to voiced) in intervocalic position and after liquids, nasals and semi-vowels. Аннепе sounds like annebe, but кушакпа sounds like kuzhakpa. However, geminate consonants do not undergo this lenition. Furthermore, the voiced consonants occurring in Russian are used in modern Russian-language loans. Consonants also become palatalized before and after front vowels. However, some words like пульчӑклӑ "dirty", present palatalized consonants without preceding or succeeding front vowels, and should be understood that such are actually phonemic:

	Labial	Dental/ Alveolar		Post- alveolar	Palatal	Velar
	Labial	plain	pal.	Post- alveolar	Palatal	Velar
Stop	p ⟨п⟩	t ⟨т⟩	tʲ ⟨ть⟩		tɕ ⟨ч⟩	k ⟨к⟩
Fricative		s ⟨c⟩		ʃ ⟨ш⟩	ɕ ⟨ҫ⟩	x ⟨x⟩
Nasal	m ⟨м⟩	n ⟨н⟩	nʲ ⟨нь⟩			
Approximant	ʋ ⟨в⟩	l ⟨л⟩	lʲ ⟨ль⟩		j ⟨й⟩	
Trill		r ⟨p⟩				

- /x/ can have a voiced allophone of [ɣ].

=== Vowels ===
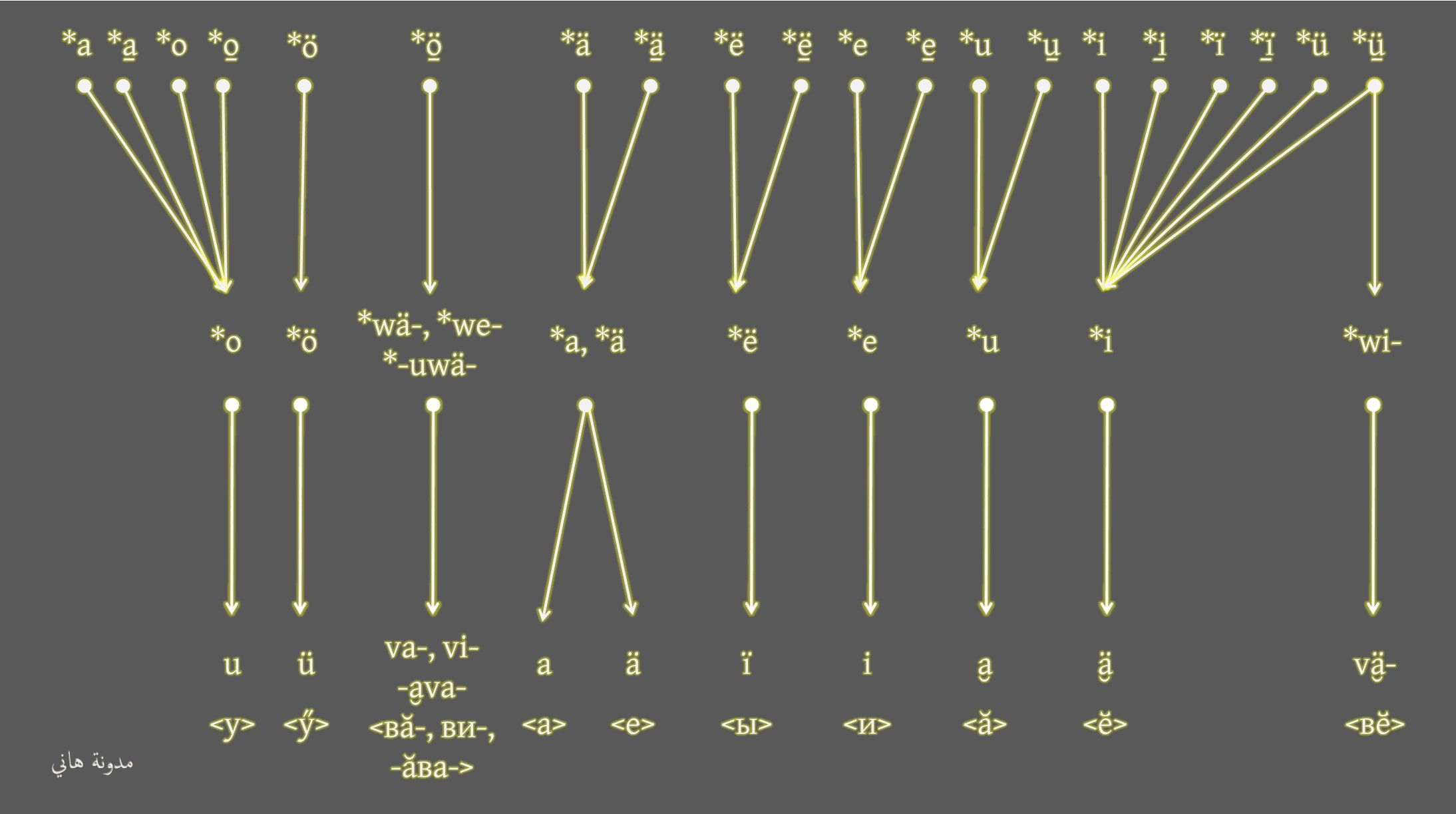
A possible scheme for the diachronic development of Chuvash vowels (note that not all the sounds with an asterisk are necessarily separate phonemes).

According to Krueger (1961), the Chuvash vowel system is as follows (the precise IPA symbols are chosen based on his description since he uses a different transcription).

	Front		Back	
	unrounded	rounded	unrounded	rounded
High	i ⟨и⟩	y ⟨ӳ⟩	ɯ ⟨ы⟩	u ⟨у⟩
Low	e ⟨е⟩	ø̆ ⟨ӗ⟩	a ⟨а⟩	ŏ ⟨ӑ⟩

András Róna-Tas (1997) provides a somewhat different description, also with a partly idiosyncratic transcription. The following table is based on his version, with additional information from Petrov (2001). Again, the IPA symbols are not directly taken from the works so they could be inaccurate.

	Front		Back	
	unrounded	rounded	unrounded	rounded
High	i ⟨и⟩	y ⟨ӳ⟩	ɯ ⟨ы⟩	u ⟨у⟩
Close-mid	ӗ ⟨ĕ⟩		ɤ̆ ⟨ӑ⟩	
Open-mid	ɛ ⟨е⟩			
Low			a ⟨а⟩	

The vowels ӑ and ӗ are described as reduced, thereby differing in quantity from the rest. In unstressed positions, they often resemble a schwa or tend to be dropped altogether in fast speech. At times, especially when stressed, they may be somewhat rounded and sound similar to /o/ and /ø/.

Additionally, ɔ (о) occurs in loanwords from Russian where the syllable is stressed in Russian.

=== Word accent ===
The usual rule given in grammars of Chuvash is that the last full (non-reduced) vowel of the word is stressed; if there are no full vowels, the first vowel is stressed. Reduced vowels that precede or follow a stressed full vowel are extremely short and non-prominent. One scholar, Dobrovolsky, however, hypothesises that there is in fact no stress in disyllabic words in which both vowels are reduced.

=== Morphonology ===
==== Vowel harmony ====
Vowel harmony is the principle by which a native Chuvash word generally incorporates either exclusively back or hard vowels (а, ӑ, у, ы) and exclusively front or soft vowels (е, ӗ, ӳ, и). As such, a Chuvash suffix such as -тен means either -тан or -тен, whichever promotes vowel harmony; a notation such as -тпӗр means either -тпӑр, -тпӗр, again with vowel harmony constituting the deciding factor.

Chuvash has two classes of vowels: front and back (see the table above). Vowel harmony states that words may not contain both front and back vowels. Therefore, most grammatical suffixes come in front and back forms, e.g. Шупашкарта, "in Cheboksary" but килте, "at home".

Two vowels cannot occur in succession.

===== Exceptions =====
Vowel harmony does not apply for some invariant suffixes such as the plural ending -сем and the 3rd person (possessive or verbal) ending -ӗ, which only have a front version. It also does not occur in loanwords and in a few native Chuvash words (such as анне "mother"). In such words suffixes harmonize with the final vowel; thus Аннепе "with the mother".

Compound words are considered separate words with respect to vowel harmony: vowels do not have to harmonize between members of the compound (so forms like сӗтел|пукан "furniture" are permissible).

==== Other processes ====
The consonant т often alternates with ч before ӗ from original *i (ят 'name' - ячӗ 'his name'). There is also an alternation between т (after consonants) and р (after vowels): тетел 'fishing net (nom.)' - dative тетел-те, but пулӑ 'fish (nom.)' - dative пулӑ-ра.

Consonants

In the Chuvash orthography, the fortis and lenis consonants are not differentiated, because their changes are very straightforward. Therefore, only voiceless consonants are written.

English word	Written Chuvash	IPA	Notes
plowing	ака (aka)	[ɑˈk̬ɑ]	
I, me	эпӗ (epĕ)	[ˈep̬ʲɘ̆]	Notice the palatalization on /p/.
ancient	авалхи (avalxi)	[ɑʋɑl̴ˈx̬ɨ]	Notice the centralization of /i/ in a back vowels word, and the lack of palatalization on /x/.
glorious	хӳхӗм (xüxĕm)	[ˈxʲyx̬ʲɘ̆mʲ]	Notice the palatalization on /m/.
nine	тӑххӑр (tăxxăr)	[ˈtŏxːŏr]	
three	виҫҫӗ (viccĕ)	[ˈʋʲiɕːɘ̆]	

Voicing also occurs on word boundaries:

English phrase	Written Chuvash	IPA	Notes
Good day!	Ырӑ кун! (Iră kun!)	[ˈɯrŏ‿k̬un]	
Is it okay?	Юрать-и? (Yuraty-i?)	[juˈrɑt̬ʲ.i]	-i is a question suffix.

== Writing systems ==
=== Official ===
Letters in bold are solely used in loanwords.

А а	Ӑ ӑ	**Б** **б**	В в	**Г** **г**	**Д** **д**
Е е	**Ё** **ё**	Ӗ ӗ	**Ж** **ж**	**З** **з**	И и
Й й	К к	Л л	М м	Н н	**О** **о**
П п	Р р	С с	Ҫ ҫ	Т т	У у
Ӳ ӳ	**Ф** **ф**	Х х	**Ц** **ц**	Ч ч	Ш ш
**Щ** **щ**	**Ъ** **ъ**	Ы ы	Ь ь	Э э	Ю ю
Я я

==== Latin alphabet ====
Latin alphabet used by Chuvash people living in the USA and Europe, used for the convenience of writing Chuvash words:

Aa	Ăă	Bb	Cc	Çç	Dd	Ее	Ĕĕ
Ff	Gg	Hh	Ii	Jj	Kk	Ll	Mm
Nn	Oo	Pp	Rr	Ss	Şş	Šš	Tt
Uu	Üü	Ww	Zz	Žž	Je	Ju	Ja	Jo

Examples of written text:

Latin alphabet	Chuvash alphabet	Meaning
Çul	Чул	stone
Çüreçe	Чӳрече	window
Şĕmĕrt	Ҫӗмӗрт	bird cherry
Şăkăr	Ҫӑкӑр	bread
Šură	Шурӑ	white
Šăl	Шӑл	tooth
Šapa	Шапа	frog
Üpĕte	Ӳпӗте	monkey
Ükerçĕk	Ӳкерчӗк	drawing
Žiraf	Жираф	giraffe
Žuk	Жук	beetle
Žjuri	Жюри	jury
Energi	Энерги	energy
Etem	Этем	human
Epir	Эпир	we
Juman	Юман	oak
Jur	Юр	snow
Jalav	Ялав	flag
Japala	Япала	thing
Jomkăş	Ёмкӑҫ	container
Joršik	Ёршик	brush
Văjlă	Вӑйлӑ	strong
Vişşĕ	Виҫҫӗ	three
Jermikke	Ермикке	market
Ješĕl	Ешӗл	green
Cunami	Цунами	tsunami

Transliteration of the Chuvash alphabet

	Name	IPA	KNAB 1995	ALA-LC 1997	Edward Allworth 1971	ISO System A	ISO System B	Turkkălla	Ivanof	Argadu	CVLat 1.1 2007	Notes
А а	a	/a/~/ɑ/	Aa	Aa	Aa	Aa	Aa	Aa	Aa	Aa	Aa	
Ӑ ӑ	ӑ	/ɤ̆/, /ə/, /ɒ/	Ää	Ăă	Ăă	Ăă	Ăă	Ĭĭ	Ah;ah	Oo	Ăă	
Б б	бӑ	/b/	Bb	Bb	Bb	Bb	Bb	Bb	Bb	Pp	Pp	only in Russian loanwords
В в	вӑ	/ʋ/~/w/, /v/ (in non-Chuvash loanwords)	Vv	Vv	Vv	Vv	Vv	Vv	Vv	Vv	Vv	
Г г	гӑ	/ɡ/	Gg	Gg	Gg	Gg	Gg	Gg	Gg	Kk	Kk	only in Russian loanwords
Д д	дӑ	/d/	Dd	Dd	Dd	Dd	Dd	Dd	Dd	Tt	Tt	only in Russian loanwords
Е е	Ee	/ɛ/	Ye-;ye-;-e-	Ee	Je-;je-;-e-	Ee	Ee	Ye-;ye-;-e-	Je-;je-;-e-	Ye-; ye-; -e-	Je-;je-;-e-	
Ё ё	ё	/jo/ or /ʲo/	Yo-, yo-, -o-	Ëë	Ëë	Ëë	Yo-, yo-, -o-	Yo-, yo-, -o-	Jo-, jo-, -o-	Yo-; yo-; -o-	Jo-, jo-, -o-	only in Russian loanwords
Ӗ ӗ	ӗ	/ɘ/ (ɘ~ø)	Ӗӗ	Ӗӗ	Öö	Ӗӗ		I̐ĭ̇	Eh;eh	Öö	Ӗӗ	e'
Ж ж	жӑ	/ʒ/	Zh;zh	Zh;zh	Žž	Žž	Zh;zh	Jj	Qq	Şş	Šš	only in Russian loanwords
З з	зӑ	/z/	Zz	Zz	Zz	Zz	Zz	Zz	Zh;zh	Ss	Ss	only in Russian loanwords
И и	и	/i/	Ii	Ii	Ii	Ii	Ii	Ii	Ii	İi	Ii	
Й й	йӑ	/j/	Yy	Ĭı̆	Jj	Jj	Jj	Yy	Jj	Yy	Jj	
К к	кӑ	/k/, /kʲ/ (c), /k̬ʲ/ (gʲ, ɟ)	Kk	Kk	Kk	Kk	Kk	Kk	Kk	Kk	Kk	
Л л	лӑ	/l/~/ɫ/, /lʲ/ (ʎ)	Ll	Ll	Ll	Ll	Ll	Ll	Ll	Ll, Ly	Ll, lĭ/l'	Ll
М м	мӑ	/m/	Mm	Mm	Mm	Mm	Mm	Mm	Mm	Mm	Mm	
Н н	нӑ	/n/, /nʲ/ (ɲ)	Nn	Nn	Nn	Nn	Nn	Nn	Nn	Nn	Nn, nĭ/n'	Nn
О о	о	/o/	Oo	Oo	Oo	Oo	Oo	Oo	Oo	Oo	Oo	
П п	пӑ	/p/, /p̬/ (b)	Pp	Pp	Pp	Pp	Pp	Pp	Pp	Pp	Pp	
Р р	рӑ	/r/~/ɾ/	Rr	Rr	Rr	Rr	Rr	Rr	Rr	Rr	Rr	Rr
С с	сӑ	/s/, /s̬/ (z)	Ss	Ss	Ss	Ss	Ss	Ss	Ss	Ss	Ss	
Ҫ ҫ	ҫӑ	/ɕ/, /ɕ̬/ (ʑ)	S';s'	Śś	Śś	Şş		Ş́ş́	Cc	Cc	Şş	Şş
Т т	тӑ	/t/, /tʲ/, /t̬ʲ/ (dʲ), /t̬/ (d)	Tt	Tt	Tt	Tt	Tt	Tt	Tt	Tt	Tt, tĭ/t'	
У у	у	/u/, /̯u/ (o)	Uu	Uu	Uu	Uu	Uu	Uu	Uu	Uu	Uu	
Ӳ ӳ	ӳ	/y/	Üü	U̇u̇	Üü	Űű		Üü	Uh;uh	Üü	Üü	U';u'
Ф ф	фӑ	/f/, /̯f̬/ (v)	Ff	Ff	Ff	Ff	Ff	Ff	Ff	Ff	Ff	only in Russian loanwords
Х х	хӑ	/χ/, /χʲ/, /χ̃/ (ɣ), /χ̃ʲ/ (ɣʲ)	Kh;kh	Kh;kh	Hh	Hh	Xx	Hh	Xx	Xx	Hh & Xx	
Ц ц	цӑ	/ʦ/, (dz)	Ts;ts	Ts;ts	Cc	Cc	Cz;cz		Zz	ts	Zz	only in Russian loanwords
Ч ч	чӑ	/ʨ/, (ʥ)	Ch;ch	Ch;ch	Čč	Čč	Ch;ch	Çç	Ch;ch	Çç	Cc	
Ш ш	шӑ	/ʃ/, (ʒ)	Sh;sh	Sh;sh	Šš	Šš	Sh;sh	Şş		Şş	Šš	
Щ щ	щӑ	/ɕː/	Shch;shch	Shch;shch	Šč;šč	Ŝŝ	Shh;shh		Th;th	Şş	Şş	only in Russian loanwords
Ъ ъ	хытӑлӑх палли	–		”	"	“	``				-j-	only in Russian loanwords. Placed after a consonant, acts as a "silent back vowel"; puts a distinct /j/ sound in front of the following iotated: Е, Ё, Ю, Я vowels with no palatalization of the preceding consonant
Ы ы	ы	/ɯ/	Ïï	Yy	Yy	Yy	Y';y'	Iı	Yy	Iı	Yy	only in beginning of words, 1-2 letters
Ь ь	ҫемҫелӗх палли	/ʲ/	’	’	-j-;'	’	`				‘	Placed after a consonant, acts as a "silent front vowel", slightly palatalizes the preceding consonant
Э э	э	/e/	Ëë	Ėė	Èè	Èè	E';e'	Ee	Ee	Ee	Ee	only first letter
Ю ю	ю	/ju/ or /ʲu/	Yŭ-;yŭ-	Iu-;iu-	Ju-;ju-	Ûû	Yu-;yu-	Yu-;yu-	Ju-;ju-	Yu-; yu-	Ju-;ju-, -‘u-	
Я я	я	/ja/ or /ʲa/	Yă-;yă-	Ia-;ia-	Ja-;ja-	Ââ	Ya-;ya-	Ya-;ya-	Ja-;ja-	Ya-; ya-	Ja-;ja-, -‘a-	

=== 1873–1938 ===
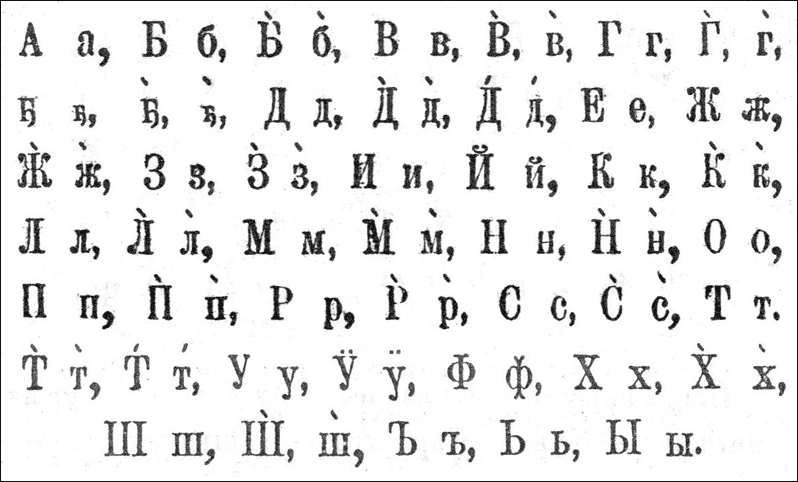
The initial alphabet of Ivan Yakovlev, with 47 letters.

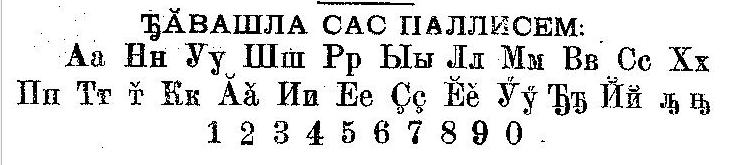
Yakovlev's revised alphabet

The modern Chuvash alphabet was devised in 1873 by school inspector Ivan Yakovlevich Yakovlev.

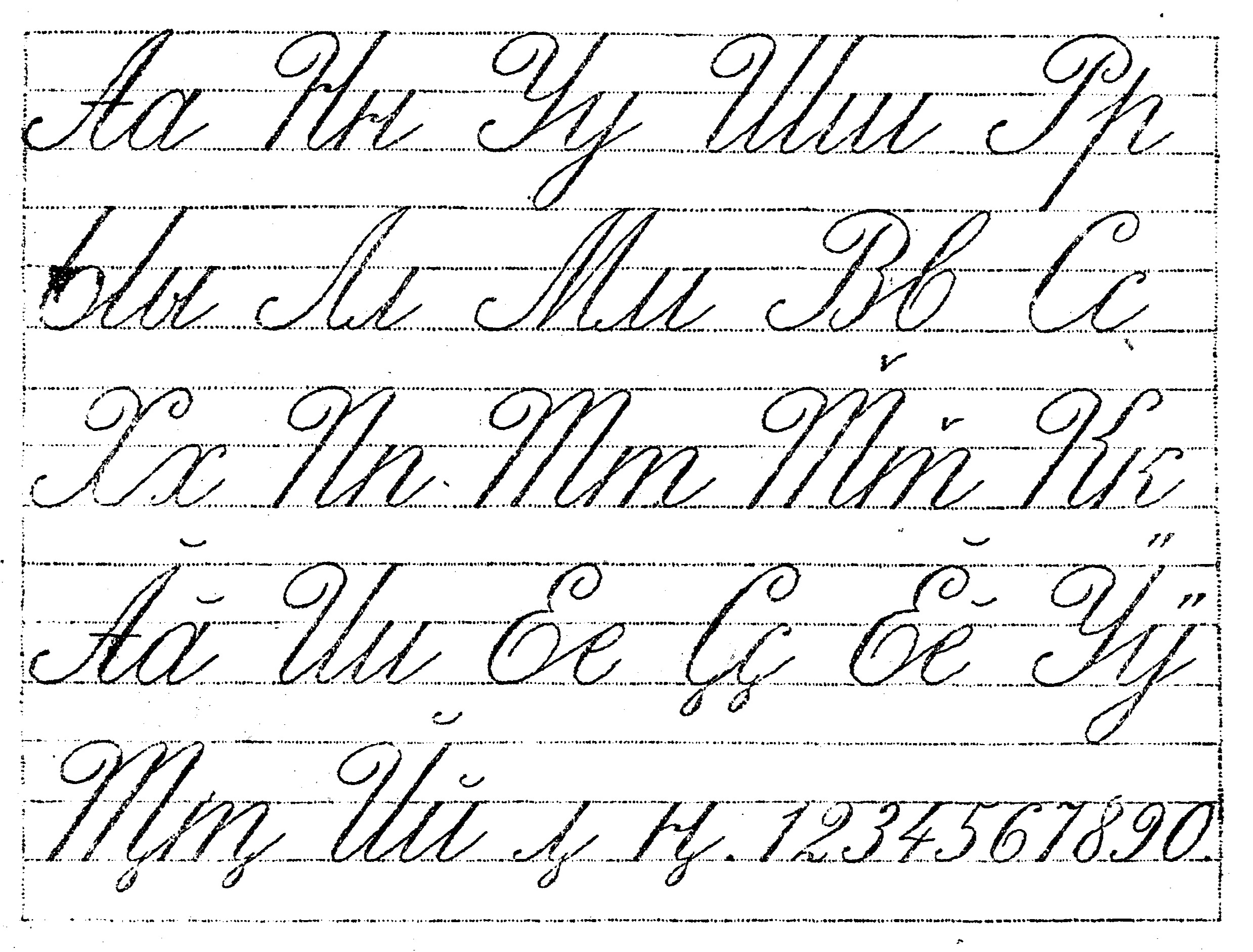
Cursive

а	е	ы	и/і	у	ӳ	ӑ	ӗ	й	в	к	л	ԡ	м	н	ԣ	п	р	р́	с	ҫ	т	т̌	ꚋ	х	ш

In 1938, the alphabet underwent significant modification which brought it to its current form.

=== Previous systems ===
The most ancient writing system, known as the Old Turkic alphabet, disappeared after the Volga Bulgars converted to Islam. Later, the Arabic script was adopted. After the Mongol invasion, writing degraded. After Peter the Great's reforms Chuvash elites disappeared, blacksmiths and some other crafts were prohibited for non-Russian nations, the Chuvash were educated in Russian, while writing in runes recurred with simple folk.

== Grammar ==
As characteristic of all Turkic languages, Chuvash is a left-branching agglutinative language with an abundance of suffixes but no native prefixes or prepositions, apart from the partly reduplicative intensive prefix, such as in: шурӑ 'white', шап-шурӑ 'snow-white'; хура 'black', хуп-хура 'jet black'; такӑр 'flat', так-такӑр 'absolutely flat'; тулли 'full', тӑп-тулли 'chock full'; (compare to Turkish beyaz 'white', bem-beyaz 'snow-white'; kara 'black', kap-kara 'jet black'; düz 'flat', dümdüz 'absolutely flat'; dolu 'full', dopdolu 'chock full'). One word can have many suffixes, which can also be used to create new words like creating a verb from a noun or a noun from a verbal root. See Vocabulary below. It can also indicate the grammatical function of the word.

=== Nominals ===
==== Nouns ====
Chuvash nouns decline in number and case and also take suffixes indicating the person of a possessor. The suffixes are placed in the order possession - number - case. There are eight noun cases in the Chuvash declension system:

Grammatical cases:
	Singular	Plural
Nominative	-∅	-сем (dial. -сам)
Genitive (of)	-(ӑ)н/-(ӗ)н	-сен
Dative-Accusative (for)	-(н)а/-(н)е	-сене
Locative (in, on)	-ра/-ре, -та/-те	-сенче
Ablative (from)	-ран/-рен, -тан/-тен	-сенчен
Instrumental (with)	-па(лан)/-пе(лен)	-семпе(лен)
Abessive (without)	-сӑр/-сӗр	-семсӗр
Causal-final	-шӑн/-шӗн	-семшӗн

In the suffixes where the first consonant varies between р- and т-, the allomorphs beginning in т- are used after stems ending in the dental sonorants -р, -л and -н. The allomorphs beginning in р- occur under all other circumstances. The dative-accusative allomorph beginning in н- is mostly used after stems ending in vowels, except in -и, -у, and -ӑ/-ӗ, whereas the one consisting only of a vowel is used after stems ending in consonants.

The nominative is used instead of the dative-accusative to express indefinite or general objects, e.g. утӑ типӗт 'to dry hay'. It can also be used instead of the genitive to express a possessor, so that the combination gets a generalised compound-like meaning (лаша пуҫӗ 'a horse head' vs лашан пуҫӗ 'the horse's head'); with both nominative and genitive, however, the possessed noun has a possessive suffix (see below).

In the genitive and dative-accusative cases, some nouns ending in -у and -ӳ were changed to -ӑв and -ӗв (ҫыру → ҫырӑвӑн, ҫырӑва, but ҫырура; пӳ → пӗвӗн, пӗве, but пӳре). In nouns ending in -ӑ, the last vowel simply deletes and may cause the last consonant to geminate (пулӑ 'fish' > пуллан). Nouns ending in consonants sometimes also geminate the last letter (ҫын 'man' → ҫыннӑн).

There are also some rarer cases, such as:

- Terminative–antessive (to), formed by adding -(ч)чен
- relic of distributive, formed by adding -серен: кунсерен 'daily, every day', килсерен 'per house', килмессерен 'every time one comes'
- Semblative (as), formed by adding пек to pronouns in genitive or objective case (ман пек 'like me', сан пек 'like you', ун пек 'like him, that way', пирӗн пек 'like us', сирӗн пек 'like you all', хам пек 'like myself', хӑвӑн пек 'like yourself', кун пек 'like this'); adding -ла, -ле to nouns (этемле 'humanlike', ленинла 'like Lenin')
- Postfix: ха; adding -шкал, -шкел to nouns in the dative (actually a postposition, but the result is spelt as one word: унашкал 'like that').

Taking кун (day) as an example:

Noun case	Singular	Plural
Nominative	кун	кунсем
Genitive	кунӑн	кунсен
Dative-Accusative	куна	кунсене
Locative	кунта	кунсенче
Ablative	кунтан	кунсенчен
Instrumental	кунпа	кунсемпе
Abessive	кунсӑр	кунсемсӗр
Causative	куншӑн	кунсемшӗн

Possession is expressed by means of constructions based on verbs meaning "to exist" and "not to exist" (пур and ҫук). For example, to say, "The cat had no shoes":

кушак + -ӑн ура атӑ(и) + -сем ҫук + -чӗ
(кушакӑн ура аттисем ҫукчӗ)

which literally translates as "cat-of foot-cover(of)-plural-his non-existent-was."

The possessive suffixes are as follows (ignoring vowel harmony):

	singular	plural
1st person	-(ӑ)м	-мӑр
2nd person	-у	-ӑр
3rd person	-ӗ/-и	-ӗ/-и

Stem-final vowels are deleted when the vowel-initial suffixes (-у, -и, -ӑр) are added to them. The 3rd person allomorph -ӗ is added to stems ending in consonants, whereas -и is used with stems ending in vowels. There is also another postvocalic variant -шӗ, which is used only in designations of family relationships: аппа 'elder sister' > аппа-шӗ. Furthermore, the noun атте 'father' is irregularly declined in possessive forms:

	singular	plural
1st person	атте аттем	аттемӗр
2nd person	аҫу	аҫӑр
3rd person	ашшӗ	ашшӗ

When case endings are added to the possessive suffixes, some changes may occur: the vowels comprising the 2nd and 3rd singular possessive suffixes are dropped before the dative-accusative suffix: (ывӑл-у-на 'to your son', ывӑл-ӗ-нe 'to his son' > ывӑлна, ывӑлнe), whereas a -н- is inserted between them and the locative and ablative suffixes: ывӑл-у-н-та 'in/at your son', ывӑл-ӗ-н-чен 'from his son'.

==== Adjectives ====
Adjectives do not agree with the nouns they modify, but may receive nominal case endings when standing alone, without a noun. The comparative suffix is -рах/-рех, or -тарах/-терех after stems ending in -р or, optionally, other sonorant consonants. The superlative is formed by encliticising or procliticising the particles чи or чӑн to the adjective in the positive degree. A special past tense form meaning '(subject) was A' is formed by adding the suffix -(ч)чӗ. Another notable feature is the formation of intensive forms via complete or partial reduplication: кӑтра 'curly' - кӑп-кӑтра 'completely curly'.

==== The 'separating' form ====
Both nouns and adjectives, declined or not, may take special 'separating' forms in -и (causing gemination when added to reduced vowel stems and, in nouns, when added to consonant-final stems) and -скер. The meaning of the form in -и is, roughly, 'the one of them that is X', while the form in -скер may be rendered as '(while) being X'. For example, пӳлӗм-р(е)-и-сем 'those of them who are in the room'. The same suffixes may form the equivalent of dependent clauses:

- ачисем килте-скер-ӗн мӗн хуйхӑрмалли пур унӑн?
  'If his children (are) at home, what does he have to be sad about?'
- йӗркеллӗ ҫынн-и курӑнать
  'You (can) see that he is a decent person'
- эсӗ килт(e)-и савӑнтарать
  (lit. 'That you are at home, pleases one').

==== Pronouns ====
The personal pronouns exhibit partly suppletive allomorphy between the nominative and oblique stems; case endings are added to the latter:

	singular		plural	
	nominative	oblique	nominative	oblique
1st person	эпӗ	ман-	эпир (эпӗр)	пир-
2nd person	эсӗ	сан-	эсир (эсӗр)	сир-
3rd person	вӑл	ун-	вӗсем	вӗсен

Demonstratives are ку 'this', ҫак 'this' (only for a known object), ҫав 'that' (for a somewhat remote object), леш 'that' (for a remote object), хай 'that' (the above-mentioned). There is a separate reflexive originally consisting of the stem in х- and personal possessive suffixes:

	singular	plural
1st person	хам	хамӑр
2nd person	ху	хӑвӑр
3rd person	хӑй	хӑйсем

Interrogatives are кам 'who', мӗн 'what', хӑш(ӗ) 'which'. Negative pronouns are formed by adding the prefix ни- to the interrogatives: никам, ним(ӗн), etc. Indefinite pronouns use the prefix та-: такам etc. Totality is expressed by пур 'all', пӗтӗм 'whole', харпӑр 'every'.

Among the pronominal adverbs that are not productively formed from the demonstratives, notable ones are the interrogatives хӑҫан 'when' and ӑҫта 'where'.

=== Verbs ===
Chuvash verbs exhibit person and can be made negative or impotential; they can also be made potential. Finally, Chuvash verbs exhibit various distinctions of tense, mood and aspect: a verb can be progressive, necessitative, aorist, future, inferential, present, past, conditional, imperative or optative.

The sequence of verbal suffixes is as follows: voice - iterativity - potentiality - negation - tense/gerund/participle - personal suffix.

Chuvash	English
кил-	(to) come
килме-	not (to) come
килейме-	not (to) be able to come
килеймен	He/she was apparently unable to come.
килеймерӗ	He/she had not been able to come.
килеймерӗр	You (plural) had not been able to come.
килеймерӗр-и?	Have you (plural) not been able to come?

==== Finite verb forms ====
The personal endings of the verb are mostly as follows (abstracting from vowel harmony):

	singular	plural
1st person	-(ӑ)п/-(ӑ)м	-(ӑ)пӑр/-(ӑ)мӑр
2nd person	-(ӑ)н	-(ӑ)р
3rd person	-(ӗ)	-(ӗ)ҫ(ӗ)

The 1st person allomorph containing -п- is found in the present and future tenses, the one containing -м- is found in other forms. The 3rd singular is absent in the future and in the present tenses, but causes palatalisation of the preceding consonant in the latter. The vowel-final allomorph of the 3rd plural -ҫӗ is used in the present. The imperative has somewhat more deviant endings in some of its forms:

	singular	plural
1st person	-ам	-ар
2nd person	-∅	-ӑр
3rd person	-тӑр	-ч(ч)ӑр

To these imperative verb forms, one may add particles expressing insistence (-сам) or, conversely, softness (-ччӗ) and politeness (-ах).

The main tense markers are:

present	-(a)т-
future	-∅-
past	-р-/-т-
pluperfect	-сатт-
iterative past	-атт-

The consonant -т of the present tense marker assimilates to the 3rd plural personal ending: -ҫҫӗ. The past tense allomorph -р- is used after vowels, while -т- is used after consonants. The simple past tense is used only for witnesses events, whereas retold events are expressed using the past participle suffix -н(ӑ) (see below). In addition to the iterative past, there is also an aspectual iterative suffix -кала- expressing repetitive action.

There are also modal markers, which do not combine with tense markers and hence have sometimes been described as tenses of their own:

	suffix
conditional/optative	-ӑттӑ-
concessive	-ин

The concessive suffix -ин is added after the personal endings, but in the 2nd singular and plural, a -с- suffix is added before them: кур-ӑ-сӑн(-ин) 'alright, see it'. If the particle -ччӗ is added, the meaning becomes optative.

Potentiality is expressed with the suffix -(а)й 'be able to'.

The negative is expressed by a suffix inserted before the tense and modal markers. It contains -м- and mostly has the form -м(а)-, but -мас- in the present and -мӑ- in the future. The imperative uses the proclitic particle ан instead (or, optionally, an enclitic мар in the 1st person).

A change of valency to a passive-reflexive 'voice' may be effected by the addition of the suffixes -ӑл- and -ӑн-, but the process is not productive and the choice of suffix is not predictable. Still, if both occur with the same stem, -ӑл- is passive and -ӑн- is reflexive. A 'reciprocal voice' form is produced by the suffixes -ӑш and -ӑҫ. There are two causative suffixes - a non-productive -ат/-ар/-ӑт and a productive -(т)тар (the single consonant allomorph occurring after monosyllabic stems).

Voice suffixes
passive- reflexive	-ӑл-, -ӑн-
reciprocal	-ӑш, -ӑҫ
causative	-(т)тар, (-ат/-ар/-ӑт)

There are, furthermore, various periphrastic constructions using the non-finite verb forms, mostly featuring predicative use of the participles (see below).

==== Non-finite verb forms ====
Some of the non-finite verb forms are:

I. Attributive participles

1. Present participle: -акан (вӗренекен 'studying' or 'being studied'); the negative form is the same as that of the past participle (see below);
2. Past participle: -н(ӑ) (курнӑ 'which has seen' or 'which has been seen'); the final vowel disappears in the negative (курман)
3. Future participle: -ас (каяс 'who will go')
4. Present participle expressing a permanent characteristic: -ан (вӗҫен 'flying')
5. Present participle expressing pretence: -анҫи, -иш
6. Necessitative participle: -малла (пулмалла 'who must become'); the negative is formed by adding the enclitic мар
7. Satisfaction participle: -малӑх (вуламалӑх 'which is enough to be read')
8. Potentiality participle: -и (ути 'which can go')

The suffix -и may be added to participles to form a verbal noun: ҫыр-нӑ 'written' > ҫыр-н-и 'writing'.

II. Adverbial participles (converbs)

1. -са (default: doing, having done, while about to do') (-сар after a negative suffix)
2. -а 'doing Y' (the verb form is usually reduplicated)
3. -нӑҫем(-ен) 'the more the subject does Y':
4. -уҫӑн 'while doing Y'
5. -сан 'having done Y', 'if the subject does Y'
6. -нӑранпа 'after/since having done Y'
7. -массерен 'whenever the subject does Y'
8. -иччен 'before/until doing Y'

III. Infinitives

The suffixes -ма and -машкӑн form infinitives.

There are many verbal periphrastic constructions using the non-finite forms, including:

1. a habitual past using the present participle and expressing periodicity (эпĕ вулакан-ччĕ lit. 'I was [a] reading [one]');
2. an alternative pluperfect using the past participle (эпĕ чĕннĕ-ччĕlit. 'I [was] one that had called'; negated by using the negatively conjugated participle эпĕ чĕнмен-ччĕ);
3. a general present equal to the present participle (эпĕ ҫыракан lit. 'I [am a] writing [one]'; negated with the enclitic мар),
4. an alternative future expressing certainty and equal to the future participle (эпĕ илес 'I [am] one who will get'; negated with an encliticised ҫук),
5. a necessitative future using the necessitative participle (ман/эпĕ тарант(ар)малла 'I [am] one who must feed'; negated with мар),
6. a second desiderative future expressing a wish and using the converb in -сан (эпĕ ҫĕнтерсен-ччĕ 'I wish I'd win'),
7. another desiderative form expressing a wish for the future and using the future participle followed by -чĕ (эпĕ пĕлес-чĕ 'I wish/hope I know', negated by мар with an encliticised -ччĕ).

=== Word order ===
Word order in Chuvash is generally subject–object–verb. Modifiers (adjectives and genitives) precede their heads in nominal phrases, too. The language uses postpositions, often originating from case-declined nouns, but the governed noun is usually in the nominative, e.g., тӗп ҫи-не 'onto (the surface of) the ground' (even though a governed pronoun tends to be in the genitive). Yes/no-questions are formed with an encliticised interrogative particle -и. The language often uses verb phrases that are formed by combining the adverbial participle in -са and certain common verbs such as пыр 'go', ҫӳре 'be going', кай 'go (away from the speaker)', кил 'go (towards the speaker)', ил 'take', кала 'say', тӑр 'stand', юл 'stay', яр 'let go'; e.g., кӗрсe кай 'go entering > enter', тухса кай 'go exiting > leave'.

== Vocabulary ==
=== Numerals ===
The number system is decimal. The numbers from one to ten are:

- 1 – pĕrre (пӗрре), pĕr (пӗр)
- 2 – ikkĕ (иккӗ), ikĕ (икӗ), ik (ик)
- 3 – wişşĕ (виҫҫӗ), wişĕ (виҫӗ), wiş (виҫ)
- 4 – tăwattă (тӑваттӑ) tvată (тватӑ), tăwat (тӑват), tvat (тват)
- 5 – pillĕk (пиллӗк), pilĕk (пилӗк), pil (пил)
- 6 – ulttă (улттӑ), IPA: [ˈultːə], ultă (ултӑ), IPA: [ˈult̬ə], ult (улт), IPA: [ult]/IPA: [ult̬]
- 7 – şiççĕ (ҫиччӗ), IPA: [ˈɕitɕːɘ], şiçĕ (ҫичӗ), IPA: [ˈɕitɕ̬ɘ], şiç (ҫич), IPA: [ˈɕitɕ̬]
- 8 – sakkăr (саккӑр), IPA: [ˈsakːər], sakăr (сакӑр), IPA: [ˈsak̬ər]
- 9 – tăhhăr (тӑххӑр), tăhăr (тӑхӑр)
- 10 – wunnă (вуннӑ), wun (вун)

The teens are formed by juxtaposing the word 'ten' and the corresponding single digit:

- 11 – wun pĕr (вун пӗр)
- 12 – wun ikkĕ (вун иккӗ), wun ikĕ (вун икӗ), wun ik (вун ик)
- 13 – wun vişşĕ (вун виҫҫӗ), wun vişĕ (вун виҫӗ), wun viş (вун виҫ)
- 14 – wun tăwattă (вун тӑваттӑ), wun tvată (вун тватӑ), wun tvat (вун тват)
- 15 – wun pillĕk (вун пиллӗк), wun pilĕk (вун пилӗк), wun pil (вун пил)
- 16 – wun ulttă (вун улттӑ), wun ultă (вун ултӑ), wun ult (вун улт)
- 17 – wun şiççĕ (вун ҫиччӗ), wun şiçĕ (вун ҫичӗ), wun şiç (вун ҫич)
- 18 – wun sakkăr (вун саккӑр), wun sakăr (вун сакӑр)
- 19 – wun tăhhăr (вун тӑххӑр), wun tăhăr (вун тӑхӑр)

The tens are formed in somewhat different ways: from 20 to 50, they exhibit suppletion; 60 and 70 have a suffix -мӑл together with stem changes; while 80 and 90 juxtapose the corresponding single digit and the word 'ten'.

- 20 – şirĕm (ҫирӗм)
- 30 – wătăr (вӑтӑр)
- 40 – hĕrĕh (хӗрӗх)
- 50 – allă (аллӑ), ală (алӑ), al (ал)
- 60 – utmăl (утмӑл)
- 70 – şitmĕl (ҫитмӗл)
- 80 – sakăr wunnă (сакӑр вуннӑ), sakăr wun (сакӑр вун)
- 90 – tăhăr wunnă (тӑхӑр вуннӑ), tăhăr wun (тӑхӑр вун)

Further multiples of ten are:

- 100 – şĕr (ҫĕр)
- 1000 – pin (пин)
- Example: 834236 - sakăr şĕr wătăr tvată pin te ik şĕr wătăr ulttă (сакӑр ҫӗр вӑтӑр тӑватӑ пин те ик ҫӗр вӑтӑр улттӑ), IPA: [ˌsakərɕɘrʋət̬ərt̬əʋat̬ə↗p̬inʲt̬eǀikɕɘrʋət̬ər↘ultːəǁ]

Ordinal numerals are formed with the suffix -mĕš (-мӗш), e.g. pĕrremĕš (пӗррӗмӗш) 'first', ikkĕmĕš (иккӗмӗш) 'second'. There are also alternate ordinal numerals formed with the suffix -ӑм/-ĕм, which are used only for days, nights and years and only for the numbers from three to seven, e.g. wişĕm (виҫӗм) 'third', tăvatăm (тӑватӑм), pilĕm (пилӗм), ultăm (ултӑм), şiçĕm (ҫичӗм), wunăm (вунӑм).

=== Word formation ===
Some notable suffixes are: -ҫӑ for agent nouns, -лӑх for abstract and instrumental nouns, -ӑш, less commonly, for abstract nouns from certain adjectives, -у (after consonants) or -v (after vowels) for action nouns, -ла, -ал, -ар, and -н for denominal verbs. The valency changing suffixes and the gerunds were mentioned in the verbal morphology section above. Diminutives may be formed with multiple suffixes such as -ашка, -(к)ка, -лчӑ, -ак/-ӑк, -ача.

== Dialects ==
The linguistic landscape of the Chuvash language is quite homogeneous, and the differences between dialects are insignificant. Currently, the differences between dialects becoming more and more leveled out.

Researchers distinguish three main dialect groups, which can be divided further into sub-dialects:

- Upper dialect (Turi, Viryal) - upstream of the Sura, preserves the /o/ sound in words like ot "horse"
  - Subdialects: a) Sundyrsky; b) Morgaussko-Yadrinsky; c) Krasnochetaysky; d) Cheboksary; e) Kalininsko-Alikovsky
- Middle dialect (mixed, transitional);
  - Subdialects: a) Malocivilsky; b) Urmarsky; c) civil-marposadsky
- Lower dialect (Anatri) - downstream of the Sura, changes the /o/ sound to /u/ in words like ut "horse"
  - Subdialects: a) Buin-Simbirsk; b) Nurlatsky (prichemshanye)

The Malokarachinsky dialect is designated as occupying a separate position.

The literary language is based on both the Lower and Upper dialects. Both Tatar and the neighbouring Uralic languages such as Mari have influenced the Chuvash language, as have Russian, Arabic and Persian, which have all added many words to the Chuvash lexicon.

Phonetic differences:

a) All words of the Upper dialect (except exc. Kalinin-Alikov subgroup) in the initial syllable, instead of the "lower" sound -U- is used -O- for example:

Turi: por, olttă, toprăm – Anatri: pur, ulttă, tuprăm (English: 'yes', 'six', 'found')

b) In the Upper dialect in the Sundyr sub-dialect, instead of the sound -ü- (used in all other dialects), the sound -ö- is used, which is a correlative soft pair of the posterior -o-, for example:

Turi: pӧrt, tӧrt, šӧrpe — Anatri: pürt, türt, šürpe (English: 'hut', 'back', 'broth')

с) In the Upper dialect (in most sub-dialects) the loss of the sound -j- before the sonorant -l-, -n-, -r- and stop -t- is characterized, which in turn entails palatalization of these consonants, for example:

Turi: mar'a, sul'l'a — Anatri: majra, sujla (English: 'Russian woman', 'choose')

d) In the Upper dialect (for most sub-dialects), gemination of intervocalic consonants is characteristic, as in the Finnish language, for example:

Turi: tottăr, ĕssĕr, kokkăr – Anatri: tutăr, üsĕr, kukăr (English: 'shawl', 'drunk', 'crooked')

In general, gemination itself is the norm for the Chuvash language, since many historically root words in both dialects contain gemination, for example: anne (mather), atte (father), piççe (brother), appa (sister), kukka (uncle), pĕrre (one), ikkĕ (two), vişşĕ (three), tăvattă (four), pillĕk (five), ulttă (six), şiççĕ (seven), sakkăr (eight), tăhhăr (nine), vunnă (ten), etc. Some linguists are inclined to assume that this is the influence of the Volga Finns at the turn of the 7th century when the ancestors of the Chuvash moved to the Volga, there are those who disagree with this statement. In one of the subgroups of the Trans-Kama Chuvash, in the same words there is no gemination at all, for example, the word father is pronounced as Adi, and mother as Ani, their counting looks like this: pĕr, ik, viş, tvat, pül, ulta, şiç, sagăr, tăgăr, vun - but many scientists assume that this is a consequence of the influence of the Tatar language. They also have many words in the Tatar style, the word “hare - kuşana” (tat.kuyan) is “mulkaç” for everyone, “pancakes - kuymak” for the rest is ikerçĕ, “cat - pĕşi” for the rest is “saş”, etc.

e) In the Middle and Upper dialects there are rounded vowels -ă°-, -ĕ°- (pronounced with the lips rounded and slightly pulled forward). In the Lower dialect they are absent and correspond to the standard sounds -ă-, -ĕ-.

f) Consonantism is distinguished by the pronunciation of the affricate sound -ç-. In the Upper and Middle dialects, the sound -ç- is almost no different from the pronunciation of the Russian affricate; in the Lower dialect it is heard almost like a soft -ç-, as in the Tatar language.

Morphological differences:

a) In Upper Chuvash there are synharmonic variants of the plural affix -sam/-sem, and in Lower Chuvash only -sem. For example:

Turi and Anatri: ĕnesem, çeçeksem (English: 'cows', 'flowers')
but: Turi lašasam, surăhsam, şaramsam – Anatri: lašasem, surăhsem, şeremsem (English: 'horses', 'sheep', 'meadows')

b) In the Upper (in most sub-dialects) the affix of the possessive case is -yăn (-yĕn), the dative case is -ya (-ye), while in the Lower, -năn (-nĕn, -n), -na (-ne). For example:

Turi: lašayăn, ĕneyĕn, lašaya, ĕneya, ĕneye – Anatri: lašan(ăn), ĕnen(ĕn), lašana, ĕnene

c) in the Upper dialect, affixes of belonging, with the exception of the 3rd person affix -i (-ĕ), have almost fallen out of use or are used extremely rarely. In the latter case, the 2nd person affix -u (-ü) of the Upper dialect usually corresponds to -ă (-ĕ) in the Lower dialect;

Turi: san puşu, san hĕrü — Anatri: san puşă, san hĕrĕ (English: 'your head', 'your daughter')

There is also a mixed type

d) In the upper dialect, the gemination of the temporal index -t- and -p- is used in the affixes of the 2nd person plural of the verb of the present tense, for example:

Turi: esĕr vulattăr, epĕr pırappăr — Anatri: esir vulatăr, epir pırappăr (English: 'are you reading', 'we are going')

The influence of Russian: we are going < epir pıratpăr

There is also a mixed type, as already mentioned above.

e) In the Upper dialect, the affix of the possibility of verbs -ay (-ey), due to contraction, monophthongized to -i:

Turi: kalimarăm, pĕlimarăm ~ pĕlimerĕm — Anatri: kalaymarăm, pĕleymerĕm (English: 'couldn't tell', 'couldn't find out')

f) In the upper dialect, the synharmonic variant of the interrogative particle -i is common, in the dialects of the Lower dialect, variants -a (-e) are used:

Turi: esĕ kayrăn-i? esĕ pĕletĕn-i / es pĕletni? – Anatri: esĕ kayrăn-a? esĕ pĕletĕn-e? es pĕletnĕ? (English: 'Have you left?' 'Do you know?')

g) in the upper dialect, individual phrases turn into a complex word by shortening (contraction):

Turi: ulmuşşi (olmaşşi), şatmari – Anatri: ulma yıvăşşi / yıvăşĕ, şatma avri (English: 'apple tree', 'frying pan handle')
Turi: hălhanki, upăte, pişĕhe – Anatri: hălha şakki, upa-etem, pilĕk şihhi (English: 'earring' ("ear pendant"), 'monkey' ("bear man"), 'belt' ("lower back tie")

Syntactic differences:

a) In the Upper dialect (in most dialects), the adverbial participle -sa (-se) performs the function of a simple predicate, which is not allowed in the Middle and Lower dialects:

Turi: Ep şırsa — Anatri: Epĕ şırtăm (English: 'I wrote')

b) In the Upper dialect, analytical constructions are used instead of a synthetic one in the Lower dialect:

Turi: Apat şima kilĕr, Kaşiť şinçe şırnă – Anatri: Apata kilĕr, Xaşatra şırnă (English: 'Go to lunch', 'It says in the newspaper')

There is also a mixed type.

Other lexical differences:

Another feature between the upper and lower dialects:

Turi: Epĕr, Esĕr – Anatri: Epir, Esir (English: 'We', 'you')

There are also those lower Chuvash (living in Kama) with a biting dialect who use the riding version of Epĕr, Esĕr. It has been established that the correct historical form is the pronunciation of Epĕr, Esĕr, A comparison with the Tatar Turkic languages, which are close to the Chuvash language, determined historical justice.

Ep / Epĕ - I, Epĕ+r - We

Es / Esĕ - You, Esĕ+r - You

Affixes -ĕr/-ăr are converted from singular to plural:

Epĕ şitrĕm - Ep+ĕr şitrĕm+ĕr / I got there - We've reached it

Epĕ şırtăt - Ep+ĕr şırtăm+ăr / I wrote - we wrote

Ham vularăm - Ham+ăr vularăm+ăr / I read it - we read it

There is no "+ir" suffix in the Chuvash language so this is a big mistake. No one says "kiltĕm+ir", vularăm+ir", çitrĕm+ir". Don't say "Hamir turăm+ir". There is a dialect with pronunciation "Ep+ĕr+ĕn" - instead of "Pir+ĕn" (our), and "Es+ĕr+ĕn" - instead of "Sir+ĕn" (your) on this we can assume that their pronunciation was historical, because the structure is more correct, but because of what evolution it transformed into "pirĕn/sirĕn".

Ep+ĕr pĕr+le - We are one

Es+ĕr ik+sĕr - The two of you

There are also very different words.

=== The dispute over the literary language ===
The modern Chuvash literary language was formed on the basis of a Lower dialect. Before this period, an old literary language based on the Upper dialect was in use. There are linguists who believe that the mother tongue was still the riding dialect of the Chuvash, when now it is considered to be the primary Lower dialect. Their arguments are based on certain factors:

1) the migration of the Chuvash in the post-Horde period was from north to south, and not vice versa, the further they moved away from the root region towards the south and east, the more their language was subject to changes. Russian language was strongly influenced by the Kipchak languages (steppe raids), and after the settlement of Simbirsk by Russian people (at that time a very large city, much larger than Cheboksary), the dialect of the Lower Chuvash in the area of Buinsk was strongly influenced by the Russian language, which is easily provable, all the most ancient records of the Chuvash language made by different travelers, such as G. F. Miller and others, contain words only of the upper-level dialect and not one of the lower-level. .

2) The U-dialect of the Lower Chuvash has undergone influence from the Northern Kipchak vowel raising, whereas the O-dialect has preserved the Common Turkic vowels.

3) One of the rules says that the sound -T- standing at the end of a borrowed word in Chuvash falls out, for example: friend - dust - tus, cross - krest - hĕres... The auslaut [t] is not pronounced in oral speech, it disappears in the position after the consonant [s] (the latter in this case is replaced by a soft [ş]): vlast' ~ vlaş, vedomost' - vetămăş, volost' - vulăs, pakost' - pakăş, sançast' - sançaş, oblast' - oblaş. In addition, the affixal [t] is not pronounced orally and in certain verb forms established as a literary language: pulmast' < [pulmaş] ~ It doesn't happen, the correct historical form: "pulmas". As well kurmast' < [kurmaş] ~ He doesn't see it, the correct historical form: "kurmas". As well kilmest' < [kilmeş] ~ It doesn't come, the correct historical form: "kilmes". The historically correct affix is "-mas/-mes", instead of "-mast'/-mest' ", which appeared as a result of the influence of the Russian language. As is known, the form with the ending -st' and -st is not peculiar to the Chuvash language by its nature, which means it is a late influence of the Russian language on the dialect of the lower Chuvash. Affixes: -mes/-mas, -mep/-map, -men/-man.

4) In most dialects, /t/ palatalizes only when it is preceded by the front vowels: kileť, pereť, ükeť, kĕteť. If /t/ is preceded by the back vowels, it doesn't palatalize: yurat, kalat, urat, păhat, kayat. In the Lower dialect, all the end T's soften.

5) A simple shortened address in the literary language has become unacceptable, only respectful treatment has been left with the correct pronunciation: Instead of "Es yuratan" - "Esĕ yuratatăn" - "do you love". "Ep pırap" - "Epĕ pıratăp" - "I'm coming".

6) Instead of the Upper dialect "Kayappăr - we go away, Utappăr - we come, Vulappăr - we read", it is customary to write and speak in a Lower dialect subject to Russification: " Kayatpăr, Utatpăr, Vulatpăr".

*There is also a mixed type, where all variants of the case are used at once, this is especially noticeable in those settlements that arose at the turn of the 17th-20th centuries, such villages created by combining speakers of upper and lower dialects gave birth to a more universal dialect where both options were used .

== Sample text ==
Chuvash

Хӗвелӗн икӗ арӑм: Ирхи Шуҫӑмпа Каҫхи Шуҫӑм.
Ир пулсан Хӗвел Ирхи Шуҫӑмран уйрӑлса каять
те яра кун тӑршшӗпе Каҫхи Шуҫӑм патнелле сулӑнать.
Ҫак икӗ мӑшӑрӗнчен унӑн ачасем:
Этем ятлӑ ывӑл тата Сывлӑм ятлӑ хӗр пур.
Этемпе Сывлӑм пӗррехинче Ҫӗр чӑмӑрӗ ҫинче тӗл пулнӑ та,
пӗр-пӗрне юратса ҫемье чӑмӑртанӑ.
Халь пурӑнакан этемсем ҫав мӑшӑрӑн тӑхӑмӗсем.

Translation:
English Translation

The Sun has two wives: Dawn and Afterglow (lit. "the Morning Glow" and "the Evening Glow")
When it is morning, the Sun leaves Dawn
and during the whole day (he) moves towards Afterglow.
From these two spouses of his, he has children:
a son named Etem (Human) and a daughter named Syvlăm (Dew).
Etem and Syvlăm once met on the globe of the Earth,
fell in love with each other and started a family.
The humans who live today are the descendants of this couple.

== See also ==
- Chuvash literature
- Bulgar language
- Cyrillic script
- Oghur languages
- Turkic Avar language
- Turkic languages
- Ivan Yakovlev
- Chuvash Wikipedia
