= A with breve (Cyrillic) =

Cyrillic letter used in Chuvash and Khanty

А with breve

Usage
- Writing system: Cyrillic
- Type: Alphabetic
- Sound values: [ə], [ɐ], [ɤ]

A with breve (Ӑ ӑ; italics: Ӑ ӑ) is a letter of the Cyrillic script. It may be a homoglyph of the Latin letter A with breve (Ă ă Ă ă) unless the typeface distinguishes between the Latin and Cyrillic breve.

It is used in the Chuvash and in both Eastern Khanty and Northern Khanty alphabets. It appears in some Nenets dictionaries as well.

In certain orthographical varieties of Bulgarian, such as in the Primer with Various Instructions, this letter was used for the sound /ɤ/. In modern Bulgarian, this sound is represented by the letter Ъ.

== Usage ==
In Chuvash, ⟨ӑ⟩ represents the mid central vowel [ə], as ⟨a⟩ in word "era". It is always reduced and can occur stressed only in the first syllable of a polysyllabic word. The sound varies in its phonetic realization from a reduced /i/ or [ə] (like the pronunciation of ⟨a⟩ in English "sofa") to a labialized version of the ⟨a⟩ in English "all" (with rounded lips). It is sometimes so reduced as to sound coalesced with the following consonant as in сӑтел table, /stel/.

== Computing codes ==
Character information
Preview	Ӑ		ӑ	
Unicode name	CYRILLIC CAPITAL LETTER; A WITH BREVE		CYRILLIC SMALL LETTER; A WITH BREVE	
Encodings	decimal	hex	dec	hex
Unicode	1232	U+04D0	1233	U+04D1
UTF-8	211 144	D3 90	211 145	D3 91
Numeric character reference	&#1232;	&#x4D0;	&#1233;	&#x4D1;

== See also ==
- А а : Cyrillic letter A
- Ă ă : Latin letter A with breve - a Romanian and Vietnamese letter
