= O with breve (Cyrillic) =

Cyrillic letter used for [ŏ] in Itelmen

- О̆ о̆

Usage
- Writing system: Cyrillic
- Type: Alphabetic
- Sound values: [ŏ], [ø]

O with breve (О̆ о̆; italics: О̆ о̆) is a letter of the Cyrillic script. In all its forms, it is a homoglyph of the Latin letter O with breve (Ŏ ŏ Ŏ ŏ). (Note: Characters may not combine well on some computers. This will cause О̆ & Ŏ to look different.)

O with breve is used in Itelmen, where it represents the extra-short close-mid back rounded vowel [ŏ] (although the newspaper Aboriginal of Kamchatka uses О with ring above instead).

It is also used in an alphabet of Khanty instead of О with diaeresis, where it represents the close-mid front rounded vowel [ø].

== See also ==
- Ŏ ŏ: Latin letter Ŏ - a Silesian letter
- Cyrillic characters in Unicode
