= Ye with breve =

Cyrillic letter used for /ɘ/ in Chuvash

- Ӗ ӗ

Usage
- Writing system: Cyrillic
- Type: Alphabetic
- Sound values: [ɘ], [ə]

Ye with breve (Ӗ ӗ; italics: Ӗ ӗ) is a letter of the Cyrillic script. In Unicode, this letter is called "Ie with breve".

Ye with breve is used only in the Chuvash language and Albanian language + Cyrillic (Shqip) to represent the close-mid central unrounded vowel /ɘ/, and mid central vowel /ə/.

== Computing codes ==
Character information
Preview	Ӗ		ӗ	
Unicode name	CYRILLIC CAPITAL LETTER; IE WITH BREVE		CYRILLIC SMALL LETTER; IE WITH BREVE	
Encodings	decimal	hex	dec	hex
Unicode	1238	U+04D6	1239	U+04D7
UTF-8	211 150	D3 96	211 151	D3 97
Numeric character reference	&#1238;	&#x4D6;	&#1239;	&#x4D7;

== See also ==
- Е е : Cyrillic Ye
