= Ukrainian orthography =

Ukrainian linguistic rules

The Ukrainian orthography (Ukrainian: Український правопис, romanized: Ukrainskyi pravopys) is the orthography for the Ukrainian language, a system of generally accepted rules that determine the ways of transmitting speech in writing.

Until the last quarter of the 14th century Old East Slavic orthography was widespread. The Cyrillic alphabet generally corresponded to the sound structure of the Old East Slavic language. For example, orthography consistently conveyed the softness and hardness of sounds—а, о, ы, ѹ, ъ were written after hard consonants, and ѧ, є, и, ю, ь were written after soft consonants. The letters ж, ч, ш, ц conveyed soft consonants.

From the 12th century the orthography changes: ъ and ь decline, there is a double spelling (чьто and что), and instead of these, the letters о, е (хочьть and хочеть) are used, labial and hissing begin to lose softness (new spelling въсѣмъ instead of вьсѣмь).

In the 15th and 16th centuries the orthography of written texts changed according to the rules developed in the Bulgarian city of Tarnovo by scribes under the guidance of Patriarch Euthymius (the second South Slavic orthographic influence): forms appear primarily in confessional-style texts твоа, всеа, accents are placed at the beginning and end of the word. The rules of the Tarnovo school are reflected in the spelling, which was normalized in the work Slovenian Grammar by Zizanii Lavrentii in 1596.

From the 17th century changes in the Ukrainian orthography come from Meletius Smotrytsky's «Ґрамма́тіки Славе́нския пра́вилное Cv́нтаґма» in 1619, when the letter ґ, the digraphs дж and дз, as well as й were introduced; in the orthography of the magazine Mermaid of the Dniester in 1837 the letter є was first used in its modern meaning, and also first introduced digraphs йо, ьо; kulishivka in 1856, when first extended consonants began to be denoted by two letters (весіллє—now весілля), changes to Kulishivka P. Zhitetsky and K. Mikhalchuk in the Notes of the South-Western Branch of the Russian Geographical Society in 1874–1875, when the letter ї began to be used in its present meaning; zhelekhivka of 1886 with the final establishment of the use of the letters е, є, и and the apostrophe in their present meaning, to the spelling of B. Hrinchenko (hrinchenkivka) in the Dictionary of the Ukrainian language for 1907–1909, which is the basis of modern spelling.

From the beginning of the 18th century most Ukrainian orthographic systems use the "Civil Script" (simplified writing of Cyrillic letters), only M. Hatsuk in 1860 proposed to use "pre-Petrine" Cyrillic. There were also attempts to Latinize the Ukrainian language, which is still being debated.

As stated in the preface to the Ukrainian orthography of the third edition, it "is an organic continuation of the first (1946) and second (1960)." "The orthography commission at the Department of Literature, Language and Art Studies of the UkrSSR Academy of Sciences prepared and approved the third edition on November 14, 1989 (published in 1990)." On June 8, 1992, the Cabinet of Ministers of Ukraine accepted the proposal of the Academy of Sciences, the Ministry of Education and the Ministry of Culture of Ukraine to introduce the orthographic norms of the third edition into language practice starting in 1992. Subsequently, the Naukova Dumka Publishing House of the National Academy of Sciences of Ukraine republished the spelling. At the same time, “at first, stereotypical reprints of spelling continued to be numbered (1993 - 4th edition, corrected and supplemented, in 1994 an additional edition with the same initial data was printed, 1996 - 5th, stereotype., 1997 - 6th, stereotype., 1998 - 7th, stereotype.), Then simply noted without numbering that the reprint is stereotypical (1999, 2000, 2002, 2003, 2004, 2005), and in the latter (2007, 2008, 2010, 2012) there is no bibliographic description at all". There is no bibliographic description in the new version of the Ukrainian orthography of 2019.

== Periods of development ==
There are from 3 to 5 main stages of formation of the spelling of the Ukrainian language:

- Ruthenian-Ukrainian period (early 10th–17th centuries)
  - ancient Ruthenian-Ukrainian period: 10th Ruthenian-Ukrainian the third quarter of the 14th century.
  - Old Ukrainian period: ost. quarter 14th–beg. 17th century
- Norms of Grammar by Meletius Smotrytsky in 1619 (17th and 18th centuries)
- New Ukrainian period (19th century–present)
  - search for the best spelling of the modern language: 19th century
  - spelling standardization with the involvement of state factors: from the beginning of the 20th century

=== Ruthenian-Ukrainian period (early 10th–17th centuries) ===
Hrammatyka slovenska (1596) by Lavrentij Zizanij. Click for full PDF.

The origins of the Ukrainian orthography come from the Slavic orthography, initiated by the creators of the Slavic alphabet. Most Ukrainian graphics have hardly changed since then. In particular, the current alphabet has only two letters that, according to prof. Ilarion Ohiienko, were not in the Cyril and Methodius alphabet: ґ, which is known since the end of the 16th century and became widespread in the 17th century; and ї, which was first written instead of the former letter ѣ and in place of е in the newly closed syllable, and then took over the functions of the sound combination й+і.

The orthography, which was based on the Slavic alphabet, was largely supported in Ukraine by natives of Bulgaria, who worked here and rewrote texts (mostly of church content). In the period from 14th to 16th centuries the liturgical (and partly secular) manuscripts were dominated by the spelling developed by the Tarnovo (Bulgarian) Patriarch Euthymius. In Ukraine, the influence of this spelling has been felt since the end of the 14th century, and lasted until the 1720s. This period is known in linguistics as the "Second South Slavic Influence".

=== Smotrytskyi's "Grammar" of 1619 (17th and 18th centuries) ===
In 1619, Meletius Smotrytskyi's work «Грамматіка славенскія правилноє синтагма» was published, where Slavic-Ukrainian writing was partially adapted to Ukrainian phonetics. Then the meanings of the letters г and ґ were distinguished, the letter combination дж and дз was introduced to denote the corresponding Ukr. sounds, the use of the letter й is legal.

In 1708, the spelling of the letters changed, and the traditional Cyrillic alphabet was replaced by a simplified version, the so-called "Civil Script". Ukrainian scientists also took part in the development of the new alphabet and graphics. The first images of 32 letters of the new font, which still form the basis for Ukrainian, Belarusian and Russian spelling, were printed in the city of Zhovkva near Lviv. Outdated letters have been removed from the alphabet: omega, fita, ksi, psi, Izhitsa, yus the big, yus the small, instead the letter я has been fixed (originally a cursive variant of yus the small).

=== New Ukrainian period (from the 19th century) ===
==== Orthography search of the 19th century ====
In 1798, Ivan Kotlyarevskyi's Eneida was published, a work that pioneered new Ukrainian literature and prompted the search for modern ways of reproducing the Ukrainian language in writing. There was a need to change the traditional script. Writers who sought to write in the living Ukrainian language had to look for means to convey the true sound of the word, rather than being guided by ancient writing. In 1818 the letter і acquired its current use, in 1837 there was the letter є and combination йо, ьо, in 1873 letter ї was added.

Instead, the letters ъ, ы and э could be found less and less often. The rapid and constant change of elements of the alphabet and their various uses gave rise to a significant number of experiments with the Ukrainian language and the creation of a large number (from 1798 to 1905 can be counted about 50 more or less common, sometimes even individual) spelling systems.

The most famous of these attempts:

- Orthography of Pavlovskyi
- Shashkevychivka (1837)
- Kulishivka — Panteleimon Kulish's orthography system in Notes on Southern Rus (1856) and in Grammar (1857)
- Drahomanivka (produced in the 1870s in Kiev by a group of Ukrainian cultural figures under the leadership of linguist Pavlo Zhytetsky, which included Mykhailo Drahomanov)
- Zhelekhivka created by Ukrainian scientist Yevhen Zhelekhivskyi while working on his own Little Russian-German Dictionary (Lviv, 1886). This spelling is enshrined in the Ruthenian Grammar by Stepan Smal-Stotskyi and Theodor Gartner, published in 1893 in Lviv. Borys Hrinchenko used some corrections in the fundamental four-volume Dictionary of the Ukrainian Language (1907-1909). Most of the spelling rules (practically based on phonetics—"write as you hear") used in Grinchenko's dictionary are still valid.

The sound and the corresponding letter of the modern Ukrainian alphabet	«Slavonic Grammar with Correct Syntax» Meletius Smotrytskyi, 1619	«Civil Script», 1708	Orthography of Kamenetskyi, 1798	Orthography of Pavlovskyi, 1818	Maksymovychivka, 1827	Shashkevychivka, 1837	Hatsukivka, 1857	Orthography of Taras Shevchenko, in particular in the "Primer of South Russia", 1861	Kulishivka, 1856	Changes to the Kulishivka of P. Zhitetskyi and K. Mikhalchuk, Notes of the South-Western Branch of the Russian Geographical Society, 1874–75	Yaryzhka, 19th century	Drahomanivka, 1870s	Zhelekhivka, 1886	Hrinchekivka, 1907	One of the variants of Latin (decision No. 9 of the commission on legal terminology, simplified system, protocol No. 2 from 19.04.1996)	Latynka Josefa Jirečeka, 1859
[ɑ] — а															a	a
[b] — б															b	b
[w] / [ʋ] — в							letter with titlo у҄ : у҄сю ручку (всю ручку)								v	v
[ɦ] — г															h, gh	h
[ɡ] — ґ	letter ґ: фѣґура (фігура)	letter г		digraph кг: кгрунтъ (ґрунт)		letter г: грунт (ґрунт)	letter г	letter г: дзигари (дзиґарі)	letter g: дзиgа (дзиґа)	digraph кг: кгрунт (ґрунт)			as in modern orthography		g	g
[d] — д															d	d
[dʲ] — дь							letter with titlo д҄								d	ď
[ɟː] — softened дд												always ддь	one letter д		dd	
[d͡ʒ] — дж	digraph дж			digraph дж		letter џ : розраџає (розраджає)									dzh	dž
[d͡z] — дз	digraph дз			digraph дз								in some versions of drahomanivka — ѕ			dz	dz
[d͡zʲ] — дзь															dz	dź
[ɛ] — е			letter э at the beginning of the word / after vowels, letters е / и after consonants: эолъ (еол), поэтъ (поет), теперъ (тепер), минѣ (мені)	letters ы / е: чырвоный (червоний), очеретъ (очерет)	letter є, at the beginning of a word sometimes э: жєньци (женці)	letters и / е: почали (почали), лебонь (либонь)	letter є: вєчир (вечір)	letters е, и, ы: тиче (тече), ныначе (неначе)	letters е / и: друже (друже), пиромъ (перо́м)		letter е: не чуе (не чує)		as in modern orthography		e	e
[jɛ] — є			letter е: мое (моє)	letter ѣ : маѣшъ (маєш)	letter е: збирае (збирає)	first letter є: почуєш	letter є́ : має́ (має)	after vowels a letter е, after soft consonants — ѣ : твое (твоє), синѣ (синє)	letter е: попивае (попиває)	letter є: має	letter е: не чуе (не чує)	digraphs је / ье: сподівајетцьа (сподівається)	as in modern orthography		ye, i.e.: Yenakiieve (Єнакієве)	je/ 'e (majetok, navčańe)
[ʒ] — ж															zh	ž
[ʒʲː] — softened жж												always жжь	one letter ж		zhzh	
[z] — з			parallel prefixes роз- / рос-, prepositions зъ / съ: зъ неи (з неї), съ кварты (з кварти)	parallel prepositions зъ / съ: зъ воломъ (з волом), съ конемъ (з конем)											z	z
[zʲ] — зь							letter with titlo з҄								z	ź
[zʲː] — softened зз												always ззь	one letter з		zz	
[ɪ] — и	alternation и / ы: другий / другый (другий)		letters и, і, ы: великій (великий), сынъ (син)	letters ы, и, е: підняты (підняти), називаю (називаю), шепшина (шипшина)	letter ы / и (letter ы —traditionally): мы ходили (ми ходили), сынъ (син), сила (сила)			letters и, ы, е: думы (думи), тыхенько (тихенько), вешневий (вишневий)	letters и / е: вимие (вимиє), задзвонемо (задзвонимо)		letter ы, after hissing — ы, и, і		as in modern orthography	in a large group of words - the initial и: идол (ідол), ижиця (іжиця), индик (індик), иржа (іржа)	y	y
[ɪ] — ы						for the first time deleted							deleted			
[i] — і	etymological ѣ : фѣґура (фігура)		letters ѣ, и, і : лѣто (літо), жинка (жінка), твій (твій)	letter only і: гомінъ (гомін)	depending on the etymology of the letter о̂, е̂, и̂, ѣ : но̂съ (ніс), пе̂чъ (піч), добри̂ (добрі), снѣѵъ (снів); in the endings of adjectives of the hard group in the nominative plural to denote ⟨і⟩, ы / ыи are used: прекрасны (прекрасні), добрыи (добрії)	якщо походив від [о] й [е] — позначався як і, якщо походив від ѣ — позначався як ѣ : рідна (рідна), недѣля (неділя)		letter и, before vowels — letter і: идучи (ідучи), патріот (патріот)	always і: стілъ (стіл), попіл (попіл), моіх (моїх)		letters и / і (before vowels and й)		letter і, before з, с, д, т, н, л, ц, якщо etymologically derived from /e/ / [ѣ] — letter ї: поділ, принїс (приніс), лїс (ліс)	after soft consonants only і, not ї	i	i
[ji] — ї			most often as ѣ, less often than и / е : ѣжакъ (їжак), ии (її)			letter ѣ : кроѣла (кроїла)	letter і́ : церкоу҄ноі́ (церковної)	letters и / і: ихъ (їх), моій (моїй)	letter і: Вкраіна (Вкраїна), моіх (моїх), тихоі (тихої)	letter ї: їсти	letter і	digraph јі: Украјіна (Україна)	as in modern orthography		yi, I, 'i : Yizhakevych (Їжакевич), Kadiivka (Кадіївка)	ji
[j] — й	entered й						letters а̏, е̏, и̏, і̏, у̏, ю̏, ѧ̏ for modern ай, ей, ий, ій, уй, юй, яй: перши̏ (перший), та̏ (та й)					letter ј: свьатиј (святий)			y, i	j
[jɔ] — йо / ьо			digraph іо: іому (йому), тріома (трьома)	digraph іо: у іого (у нього)	letter ё: ёго (його), сёго (сього / цього)	for the first time digraphs йо, ьо: його, сьогодні	letter о̂ : важко о̂му (важко йому)	letter ё or digraph йо: ёго (його), слёзы / слйози (сльози)	letter ё: ёго (його), лёнъ (льон)	letter ё, softness of the consonant before ⟨о⟩ — ьо: ёго (його), трьох	digraph іо: сліозы (сльози)	digraph јо / ьо: сльоза	as in modern orthography		yo, 'o	jo / 'o (johurt, sľozy)
[k] — к															k	k
[l] — л													in foreign words - soft л: кляса (клас), блюза (блуза)		l	l
[lʲ] — ль							letter with titlo л҄								l	ľ; pered nastupnoju pryholosnoju abo v kinci slova l
[ʎː] — softened лл					extended pronunciation in the letter was not transmitted: бездѣлье (безділля, неробство)	extended pronunciation in the letter was not transmitted: зѣля (зілля)			double л: весіллє (весілля)			always лль	one л: зїлє (зілля)		ll	odna litera ľ (vesiľe, ziľe)
[m] — м															m	m
[n] — н															n	n
[nʲ] — нь							letter with titlo н҄								n	ń
[ɲː] — softened нн												always ннь	one letter н: знанє (знання)		nn	odna litera ń (znańe)
[ɔ] — о															o	o
[p] — п															p	p
[r] — р															r	r
[rʲ] — рь							letter with titlo р҄								r	abeceda skladala śa na osnovi halyckoji literaturnoji movy XIX stoliťa, jaka ne mala danoho zvuka
[s] — с															s	s
[sʲ] — сь							letter with titlo с҄								s	ś
[sʲː] — softened сс			letter combinations сь + iotated vowel: волосья (волосся)									always ссь	one letter с		ss	
[t] — т															t	t
[tʲ] — ть							letter with titlo т҄								t	ť
[cː] — softened тт												always тть: завзяттьа (завзяття)	one letter т: житє (життя)		tt: Zakarpattia (Закарпаття)	odna litera ť (Zakarpaťe)
[u] — у															u	u
[u̯] — в / у	alternation у / в: урядъ / врядъ (уряд)				at the end of the syllable is a letter ў : ходиў (ходив), sometimes verbs in the masculine singular form of the past tense retained an ancient ending in writing -лъ: ходилъ, читалъ	letter ў : порубаў (порубав)									v / u	v / u
[f] — ф															f	f
[x] — х															kh	ch
[t͡s] — ц															ts	c
[t͡sʲː] — softened цц												always цць	one letter ц		tsts	
[t͡sʲ] — ць							letter with titlo ц҄								ts	ć
[t͡ʃ] — ч															ch	č
[t͡ʃʲː] — softened чч												always ччь	one letter ч		chch	
[ʃ] — ш															sh	š
[ʃʲː] — softened шш												always шшь	one letter ш		shsh	
[ʃt͡ʃ] — щ					digraph сч: счобъ (щоб)							digraph шч: шчука (щука)			sch	šč
ь in most positions	ь	ь	ь	ь			҄ титло: тїл҄ки (тільки)							ь	Ø	' abo ˇ (ća, ńe, śu, źo ale ďa, ľe, ťo)
ь after the final hissing, labial consonant and «р» — now Ø	alternation ь / ъ: пишешь / пишешъ (пишеш)													Writing «рь» at the end of the word		
ь in words світ, свято													with a letter ь: сьвіт (світ), сьвято (свято)			
[ju] — ю												digraph ју / ьу: в ріднім крају (у ріднім краю)			yu, iu: Yurii (Юрій), Kriukivka (Крюківка)	ju / 'u
[jɑ] — я							letter ѧ		the letter є is in middle nouns: щастє (щастя)			digraphs ја /ьа : јаблуко (яблуко), свьатиј (святий)			ya, ia	ja / 'a
apostrophe			letters ъ and ь: зъѣвъ (з'їв), напьявсь (нап'явсь)		not used: позавязовани (позав'язувані)	did not affect the letter — бю (б'ю)	' — м'яка зупинка		letters ъ / ь: семьі (сім'ї), разъединила (роз'єднала)			letter j: відобјетцьа (відіб'ється)	first introduced	apostrophe systematically after labial consonants before є, ї, я, ю		missing
ъ after the final consonant now Ø			always ъ: бувъ (був)	always ъ: Чмыръ (Чмир)	always ъ: изъ (із)	deleted	v — важка зупинка	always ъ: ихъ (їх)	always ъ: безъ пана (без пана)	deleted	most often written		deleted			
ѣ — now mostly і				letter only і: гомінъ (гомін)	the letter ѣ meant sound [і]: снѣгъ (сніг), бѣдный (бідний)	if the sound [i] came from ѣ, the letter ѣ was preserved: недѣля (неділя)					letter ѣ for sound [i]		deleted			
simplification in groups of consonants стн — now сн	alternation of a simplified / complete group of consonants: честний / чесний (чесний)															
etymological /т'с'а/ — now -ться			-тся, -ться or -тця: дадуться (дадуться), остатця (остаться / залишитися)	-цьця: быцьця (биться / битися)		-т-ся: бют-ся (б'ються)		-ця, -тця, -тся: дивиця / дивитця (дивиться), радуются (радуються)	-тьця, -тця: вертаютьця (вертаються)			‑тцьа: усміхнетцьа (усміхнеться)	-тця, -цця: зоветця (зветься), робицця (робиться)			-ť śa (dyvyť śa) častka «śa» zavždy vžyvajeť śa okremo
sound combination [чц'і] — now -чці			-ццѣ : боляццѣ (болячці)	-цьці: печуроцьці (печурочці / печічці)		-чцѣ : дочцѣ (дочці)		-ці, -цці: вкупоці (укупочці), колисоцці (колисочці)								-čci
etymological /шс'я/ — now шся				-сься: засміѣсься (засмієшся)		-ся / -шся: вибераєся (вибираєшся), напєшся (нап'єшся)		-ся, -сся: умыеся (умиєшся), подинесся (подінешся)	-шся, -сся: одібъешся (одіб'єшся)		-сся: поденесся (подінешся)					-š śa (zasmiješ śa) častka «śa» zavždy vžyvajeť śa okremo
etymological /тч/ — now тч													-ч- : квічали (квітчали)			tč
ѥ		deleted														
ѕ		deleted														
ѡ — now mostly о / і		deleted														
ѫ — now mostly у		deleted														
ѱ — now пс		deleted														
ѯ — now кс		deleted														
ѵ — now mostly і		deleted														

==== Orthography standardization (20th and 21st centuries) ====
Hrinchenko's work became an informal spelling and model for Ukrainian writers and publications from 1907 until the creation of the first official Ukrainian spelling in 1918.

On January 17, 1918, the Central Council of Ukraine issued the "Main Rules of Ukrainian Spelling," which, however, did not cover the entire scope of the language. On May 17, 1919, the Ukrainian Academy of Sciences approved the "Main Rules of Ukrainian Orthography", which became the basis for all subsequent revisions and amendments.

On July 23, 1925, the Council of People's Commissars of the UkrSSR decided to organize a State Commission for the Regulation of Ukrainian Orthography (State Orthography Commission). It included more than 20 scientists from the UkrSSR, who also expressed a desire to invite representatives of Western Ukraine: Stepan Smal-Stotskyi, Volodymyr Hnatiuk and Vasyl Simovych.

After almost a year of work in April 1926, the "Draft of Ukrainian Orthography" was published to acquaint the general public. After several months of discussion and consideration of the draft at the All-Ukrainian Orthography Conference (May 26 — June 6, 1927, Kharkiv), the orthography was adopted in accordance with the CPC resolution of September 6, 1928. It went down in history as "Orthography of Kharkiv" or "Orthography of Skrypnyk" from the place of creation or the name of the then People's Commissar for Education Mykola Skrypnyk.

In 1929, Hryhorii Holoskevych published the Orthographic Dictionary (about 40,000 words), agreed with the full spelling produced by the State Orthographic Commission and approved by the People's Commissar for Education (September 6, 1928).

In 1933, the orthography commission headed by the Deputy People's Commissar for Education of the UkrSSR Andrii Khvylia banned the Ukrainian orthography of 1928 as "nationalist", immediately stopped publishing any dictionaries and without any discussion in a very short time (5 months) created a new orthography that as never before he unified the Ukrainian and Russian languages. The letter ґ was removed from the alphabet, and Ukrainian scientific terminology was revised and agreed with Russian-Ukrainian dictionaries (the Institute of Ukrainian Scientific Language was abolished in 1930. The Ukrainian orthography of 1933 was approved by the resolution of the People's Commissar of Education of the UkrSSR on September 5, 1933.

Some minor changes were made to the orthography of 1946 and the orthography of 1959 (published the following year). It was connected with the document "Rules of Russian orthography and punctuation", which was published in 1956. From 1960 until 1990, the official edition was 1960.

After the beginning of the "perestroika" the issue of improving the Ukrainian spelling became relevant again - the editing of the spelling code was started by the Spelling Commission at the LMM of the USSR Academy of Sciences. The project was also discussed in the newly established Ukrainian Language Society. T. Shevchenko (headed by Dmytro Pavlychko). The new version was approved on November 14, 1989, and published in 1990. The main achievements were the restoration of the letter ґ and the vocative case (in Soviet times it was optional and was called the vocative form).

During the First International Congress of Ukrainians (August 27 - September 3, 1991) a resolution was adopted on the need to develop a single modern spelling for Ukrainians living in Ukraine and in the diaspora, which should be based on the entire historical experience of the Ukrainian language.

On June 15, 1994, the Government of Ukraine approved the composition of the Ukrainian National Commission on Orthography under the Cabinet of Ministers. The initial goal was to prepare a new version of the spelling in 2 1/2 years (until the end of 1996), but the work on preparing the updated rules was significantly delayed. Finally, all developed proposals were submitted to the Institute of the Ukrainian Language in mid-January 1999. This project is known as the "Draft Ukrainian orthography of 1999" (because, among other things, it proposes to restore iotation before vowels, as it was before 1933).

Some modern Ukrainian publishing houses deviated somewhat from the rules of writing at the time, such as borrowed neologisms and foreign proper names. Thus, in many geographical, historical and artistic books, they use transliteration methods (from languages that use the Latin alphabet), regardless of the spelling: «А-Ба-Ба-Га-Ла-Ма-Га» (Kyiv) in a series books about Harry Potter; «Астролябія» (Lviv) in a series of works by Tolkien ("The Lord of the Rings", "The Hobbit", "The Children of Húrin" and "The Silmarillion"); «Літопис» (Lviv); «Мапа» (Kyiv) and the encyclopedia УСЕ published by «Ірина» (Kyiv), as well as the publishing house «Критика». These editions refer to the German H and G in their proper names as Г and Ґ. According to the orthography of 1993, "G and h are usually transmitted by the letter г" (§ 87).

On May 22, 2019, the Cabinet of Ministers at its meeting approved the Ukrainian orthography in a new version developed by the Ukrainian National Orthography Commission.

On January 27, 2021, the Kyiv District Administrative Court annulled Cabinet Resolution No. 437 “Issues of Ukrainian Orthography”, which approved a new version of “Ukrainian Orthography” allegedly due to the fact that the Cabinet of Ministers of Ukraine did not have the appropriate competence. The Sixth Administrative Court of Appeal found the decision of the Kyiv District Administrative Court to cancel the new spelling illegal and annulled it.

On 28 March 2026 the new standard of Ukrainian orthography, confirmed on 1 March by the decision of a special state commission, was approved by the Cabinet of Ministers of Ukraine. It is mostly identical to the 2019 standard, but contains several minor changes.

== The structure of the current orthography ==
Given in accordance with the wording of the orthography of 2019.

I. Orthography of parts of the word base (§ 1–65)

II. Orthography of endings of declension words (§ 66–120)

III. Orthography of words of foreign origin (§ 121–140)

IV. Orthography of proper names (§ 141–154)

V. Punctuation (§ 155–168)

== See also ==
- Ukrainian language
- Ukrainian alphabet
- Ukrainian Latin alphabet
- Chronology of Ukrainian language suppression
- Ukrainian orthography of 1904
- Ukrainian orthography of 1918-1921
- Ukrainian orthography of 1928
- Ukrainian orthography of 1933
- Ukrainian orthography of 1946
- Ukrainian orthography of 1960
- Draft Ukrainian orthography of 1999
- Draft Ukrainian orthography of 2003

== Sources ==
- Найголовніші правила українського правопису — передрук із київського видання 1921 р.
- Український правопис / НАН України, Інститут мовознавства імені О. О. Потебні; Інститут української мови — Київ: Наукова думка, 1994. — 240 с.
- Український правопис / НАН України, Інститут мовознавства імені О. О. Потебні; Інститут української мови — Київ: Наукова думка, 2007. — 288 с.
- Данильчук Д. В. Український правопис: Роздоріжжя і дороговкази. — Київ: Либідь, 2013. — 224 с. ISBN 978-966-06-0648-7
- Данильчук Д. Український правопис: Курс лекцій. — Київ: ВПЦ «Київський університет», 2013. — 60 с. ISBN 978-966-439-619-3
- Зубков М. Г. Українська мова: Універсальний довідник. — Харків: Видавничий дім «Школа», 2004. — 496 с. ISBN 966-8114-55-8
- Ющук І. П. Українська мова. — Київ: Либідь, 2005. — 640 с. ISBN 966-06-0387-8
- Українська мова у XX сторіччі: історія лінгвоциду: документи і матеріали / Упоряд.: Л. Масенко та ін. — Київ: Видавничий дім «Києво-Могилянська академія», 2005. — 399 с. ISBN 966-518-314-1 Зміст книжки. Djvu-файл книжки з текстовим шаром і навігацією.
