= Yaryzhka =

Orthography of the Ukrainian language prior to the Russian Revolution

Yaryzhka (Ukrainian: яри́жка) or Orthography of Slobozhanshchyna (Ukrainian: слобожанський правопис) is the name of the pre-revolutionary orthography used to write and print works in the Ukrainian language in the Russian Empire. Yaryzhka included all the letters that were part of the Russian Cyrillic alphabet of the pre-revolutionary period: ы, ъ, and so on.

According to the Ukrainian scientist Ahatanhel Krymskyi, even before 1876, in particular in the first half of the 19th century, such Ukrainian writers as Hryhir Kvitka-Osnovianenko, Yevhen Hrebinka, Taras Shevchenko, etc. used the yaryzhka. From 1798 to 1876 the use of yaryzhka was optional in the territory of the Russian Empire, but still quite common due to the lack of a separate standardized spelling for the Ukrainian language (alternative to yaryzhka were Latin alphabets and newly created Ukrainian alphabets — Orthography of Kamenetskyi of 1798, Orthography of Pavlovskyi, 1818, Maksymovychivka, 1827, Shashkevychivka, 1837, Kulishivka, 1856, Hatsukivka, 1857, etc.).

After 1876, the use of yaryzhka became mandatory in the Russian Empire under the Ems Decree of 1876, which banned the use of the Ukrainian language in all areas, including the use of a separate Ukrainian orthography and a separate Ukrainian alphabet, in writing and printing. Censorship in the Russian Empire allowed the publication of only texts written or printed in the Russian Cyrillic alphabet of the period of Russian pre-revolutionary spelling.

The Ems decree was in force until 1905, when it was abolished, but at the beginning of World War I in January 1915, the Russian military restored the Ems decree of 1876, closing all Ukrainian publishing houses within the Kyiv Military District, except for the magazine Ridnyi Krai, which had to start using yaryzhka so as not to close.

== The origin of the term ==
The name yaryzhka comes from the name of the letter of the Russian Cyrillic alphabet ы — yery. Initially, this term was pronounced as yeryzhka, and later began to be pronounced as yaryzhka: under the influence of the word yaryga ("a man of low social status, a laborer, on the run"). Ahatanhel Krymskyi explains the convergence of these words by the fact that the word yaryzhka should in this case define something bureaucratic, state-imposed by force.

Mykhailo Kotsiubynskyi ironically called the yaryzhka Romanovka, referring to the Romanov dynasty.

== Non-use of the yaryzhka outside the territory of the Russian Empire ==
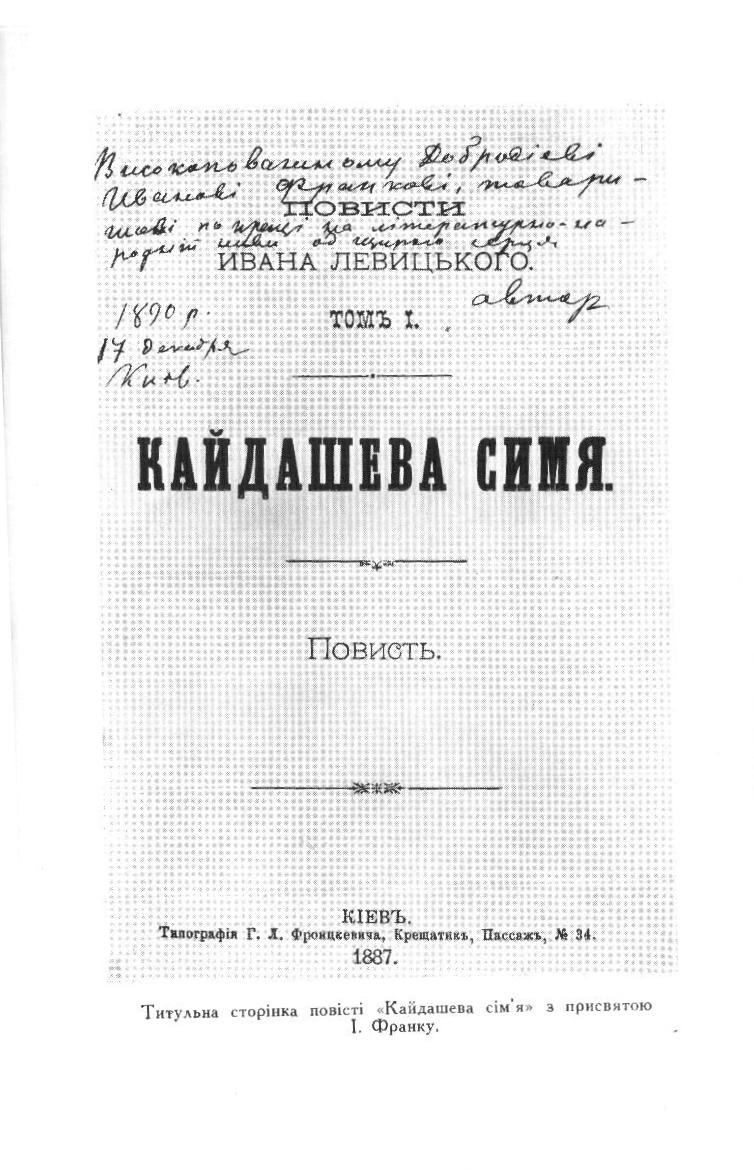
Front page of Ivan Nechuy-Levytsky's Kaidash's Family, published in 1887 in Kyiv; unlike the printed text, which is composed in yaryzhka according to publication rules of the Russian Empire, the author's signature addressed to Austrian subject Ivan Franko is written using the standard Ukrainian orthography

Although the yaryzhka was used by Ukrainian writers published in the Russian Empire, in their private correspondence and for the printing of their works in Austria-Hungary they no longer used yaryzhka, but Kulishivka.

== Orthographic features of the yaryzhka ==
The spelling of yaryzhka, except for the preservation of the etymological ъ at the end of words after consonants, was phonetic:

- the letter e after consonants corresponds to the Ukrainian e, and in other cases — the Ukrainian letter є: не чуе;
- after consonants the letter ё was sometimes used, but more often іо: сліозы (after hissing о: чорный); at the beginning of words and after vowels — usually a combination of io;
- the letters і and и differ only formally, as in the Russian orthography of the time (і is written before vowels and before й), and the sound is answered as a simple Ukrainian і, and iotated ї (after vowels);
- the letter ы corresponds to the Ukrainian и, but after the hissing can be replaced by и (or і);
- ъ and ь are written in general according to the Russian system, although ъ at the end of words in some editions could be absent;
- ѣ was used in the role є after consonants, sometimes in place of iotated ї;
- in cases of contradiction of the Russian etymological writing to the Ukrainian pronunciation (falling or inserted sounds, strong change of pronunciation, etc.) phonetics were used at writing: серце, сонце, винъ, пизнае, срибло, выйшла, вже, хто, довго, щобъ, билый, витеръ, сміютця, гуляють, здалась, було, etc.

== Examples ==
Yaryzhka orthography: Катерино, серце мое! Лышенько зъ тобою! Де ты въ свити поденесся Зъ малымъ сиротою? Хто спытае, прывитае, Безъ милого, въ свити? Батько, маты — чужи люды, Тяжко зъ нымы жыты!..

Modern orthography: Катерино, серце моє! Лишенько з тобою! Де ти в світі подінешся З малим сиротою? Хто спитає, привітає, Без милого, в світі? Батько, мати — чужі люди, Тяжко з ними жити!..

Translation: Catherine, my heart! Trouble is with you! Where in the world will you go with a small orphan? Who asks, greets without sweetness, in the world? The father and mother are strangers, and it is hard to live with them!

== See also ==
- Drahomanivka
- Zhelekhivka
