= Anthem of Kryvyi Rih =

Himn Kryvoho Rohu
English: Anthem of Kryvyi Rih
- Гімн Кривого Рогу
- Also known as: Кривий Ріг – моє місто (English: Kryvyi Rih – my city)
- Lyrics: V. Udovenko
- Music: I. Shevchenko
- Adopted: 2002

"Anthem of Kryvyi Rih" is the anthem of the city of Kryvyi Rih, Ukraine. It was adopted officially in 2002.

== Lyrics ==
Ukrainian (Cyrillic)	Romanization	English translation
Рідний мій Кривий Ріг - моє місто невтомне, В світі інших таких не зустрінеш ніде. На просторих майданах, у шахтах і домнах Все кипить, все міняється, стрімко росте!	Ridnyy miy Kryvyy Rih - moye misto nevtomne, V sviti inshykh takykh ne zustrinesh nide. Na prostorykh maydanakh, u shakhtakh i domnakh Vse kypytʹ, vse minyayetʹsya, strimko roste!	My native Kryviy Rih is my tireless city, In the world of other such you will not find anywhere. On spacious squares, in mines and in blast furnaces Everything is boiling, everything changes, it is growing fast!
Приспів: Кривий Ріг - моє місто, Це тобі моя пісня, Хай летить вона в небо високе твоє. Ти - перлина держави, Її гордість і слава, Я вклоняюся долі, що ти в мене є!	Pryspiv: Kryvyy Rih - moye misto, Tse tobi moya pisnya, Khay letytʹ vona v nebo vysoke tvoye. Ty - perlyna derzhavy, Yiyi hordistʹ i slava, YA vklonyayusya doli, shcho ty v mene ye!	Chorus: Kryvy Rih is my city This is my song for you Let her flutter into your high sky. You are a pearl of the state, Her pride and glory I worship the fate that you have in me!
Не коривсь, Кривий Ріг, ворогам ти ніяким, Скільки б землю твою не топтали вони. Переможну весну принесли в сорок п'ятім Твої віддані дочки і мужні сини!	Не коривсь, Кривий Ріг, ворогам ти ніяким, Скільки б землю твою не топтали вони. Переможну весну принесли в сорок п'ятім Твої віддані дочки і мужні сини!	Do not get caught up, Kryvy Rih, you're no enemies How much they would not tread your land. The victorious spring brought in forty-fifth Your loyal daughters and courageous sons!
Приспів: Кривий Ріг - моє місто, Це тобі моя пісня, Хай летить вона в небо високе твоє. Ти - перлина держави, Її гордість і слава, Я вклоняюся долі, що ти в мене є!	Pryspiv: Kryvyy Rih - moye misto, Tse tobi moya pisnya, Khay letytʹ vona v nebo vysoke tvoye. Ty - perlyna derzhavy, Yiyi hordistʹ i slava, YA vklonyayusya doli, shcho ty v mene ye!	Chorus: Kryvy Rih is my city This is my song for you Let her flutter into your high sky. You are a pearl of the state, Her pride and glory I worship the fate that you have in me!
Де навічно злились Інгулець з Саксаганню, Полонить ніжно душу святе почуття. Кривий Ріг, ти моє незрадливе кохання, Вірю я у щасливе твоє майбуття!	De navichno zlylysʹ Inhuletsʹ z Saksahannyu, Polonytʹ nizhno dushu svyate pochuttya. Kryvyy Rih, ty moye nezradlyve kokhannya, Viryu ya u shchaslyve tvoye maybuttya!	Where Ingulets and Saksagan are merged forever Grip the soul with a holy feeling. Kryvy Rih, you are my inept love I believe in your happy future!
Приспів: Кривий Ріг - моє місто, Це тобі моя пісня, Хай летить вона в небо високе твоє. Ти - перлина держави, Її гордість і слава, Я вклоняюся долі, що ти в мене є!	Pryspiv: Kryvyy Rih - moye misto, Tse tobi moya pisnya, Khay letytʹ vona v nebo vysoke tvoye. Ty - perlyna derzhavy, Yiyi hordistʹ i slava, YA vklonyayusya doli, shcho ty v mene ye!	Chorus: Kryvy Rih is my city This is my song for you Let her flutter into your high sky. You are a pearl of the state, Her pride and glory I worship the fate that you have in me!
