= Hrinchenkivka =

Alternative orthography of the Ukrainian language

Hrinchenkivka (Ukrainian: Грінченківка) or hrinchevychivka (Ukrainian: Грінчевичівка) was Ukrainian orthography introduced by Borys Hrinchenko’s Ukrainian-Russian dictionary in 1907.

== Orthography ==
In the preface to his Russian-Ukrainian dictionary, Hrinchenko noted that his publication used "in Ukrainian parallels" spelling from the "Dictionary of the Russian Language" compiled by the Second Department of the Imperial Academy of Sciences, as well as the Ukrainian orthography of 1904 to be adopted in Transnistrian Ukraine.

Hrinchenko adopted elements of the 1904 spelling such as the use of йо, ьо and apostrophes, in particular the use of the apostrophe and after labial consonants before є, ї, я, ю, that use only і after soft consonants, and so on.

However, Hrinchenko introduced significant changes to the Ukrainian orthography of 1904. Contrary to the orthography adopted in 1904 in Transnistrian Ukraine NTSh in Lviv, Hrinchenko printed a large group of common names, according to the Dnieper pronunciation, with the initial letter и: идол, ижиця, икати, илкий, инакий and derived from it, индик, иржа, Ирід (Ирод), искра, ич.

== Legacy ==
Almost unchanged, Hrinchenkivka was used by Ye. Tymchenko to write his dictionary of 1907, Ukrainian Grammar.

Ilarion Ohiienko said about the role of B. Hrinchenko: "The spelling of this dictionary was accepted in all Ukrainian editions and publications. This spelling, as follows from the collective work of writers of the entire 19th century and the entire Ukrainian people, has prevailed in Ukraine and remains with us to this day." B. Hrinchenko adopted everything that was rational in earlier work, that corresponded to the nature of the Ukrainian language, and gave Ukrainian spelling a national face. However, this spelling was not used in all details. For example, in the Russian-Ukrainian dictionary of geographical terminology, compiled by the Nature Commission of the Ukrainian Society of School Education (1917), the apostrophe is not used.
