= Draft Ukrainian orthography of 1939 =

The Draft Ukrainian orthography of 1939 (Ukrainian: Проєкт українського правопису 1939 року, romanized: Proiekt ukrainskoho pravopysu 1939 roku) to replace the orthography of 1933 was prepared by the State Spelling Commission at the Institute of Linguistics of the UkrSSR Academy of Sciences, with the official goal of "eliminating nationalist distortions" of the spelling.

The compiler of the 1933 orthography, Andrii Khvylia (Olinter), was shot dead on February 8, 1938. On May 8, 1938, the Central Committee of the Communist Party of Belarus (Bolsheviks) composed of: F. Redko (chairman), M. Hrunskyi (scientific secretary), T. Shmatlai, M. Boiko, Pelipas, V. Havryk, A. Hrynstein. Rada nar. Commissioners approved it on May 14, 1938. The work of the Commission was supervised by the scientific secretary, prof. MK Grunsky. The work was planned to be completed by May 25, then the term was extended until October 1, 1938.

The draft changes were discussed in detail at several meetings of the Institute of Linguistics. At the end of 1938, the finished project was approved by the Commission and published in a circulation of 250 copies. for a broad discussion that lasted throughout the year. At the end of 1939, the Commission summed up the results and published "Ukrainian orthography" edited by Mykola Hrunskyi with a circulation of 350 copies. on the rights of the manuscript. After further consideration by the State Commission, the modified spelling was to be approved by government agencies and issued as mandatory for public use. However, changes in the leadership of the People's Commissariat of Education and the beginning of World War II hampered formal procedures and the draft remained unapproved.

== Text ==
- Hrunskyi, Mykola (1938). Ukrainian orthography (Draft edition of the fourth). Kyiv: Soviet school. Archived from the original on 2021-08-22. — 123 с. 350 copies.
- Hrunskyi, М. К., ed. (1940). Ukrainian orthography (Draft edition of the fourth). Kyiv. Archived from the original on 2021-08-22. — 150 p. 50 copies.
