= Ukrainian alphabet =

Alphabet that uses letters from the Cyrillic script

Ukrainian alphabet Українська абетка
- Script type: Alphabet
- Period: 15th century (Ruthenian), 18th century (Modern Ukrainian) to present
- Official script: Ukraine
- Languages: Ukrainian

Related scripts
- Parent systems: Egyptian hieroglyphs: Phoenician alphabet; Greek alphabet (partly Glagolitic alphabet); Early Cyrillic alphabet; Ukrainian alphabet
- Sister systems: Ukrainian Latin; Pannonian Rusyn; Carpathian Rusyn alphabets Russian; Belarusian; Bulgarian

ISO 15924
- ISO 15924: Cyrl (220), Cyrillic

Unicode
- Unicode alias: Cyrillic
- Unicode range: Subset of Cyrillic (U+0400 ... U+04FF)

The Ukrainian alphabet (Ukrainian: абетка, азбука, алфавіт, or альфабет [1928–1933 spelling and before 1933], romanized: abétka, ázbuka, alfávít, or alʹfabét) is the set of letters used to write Ukrainian, which is the official language of Ukraine. It is one of several national variations of the Cyrillic script. It comes from the Cyrillic script, which was devised in the 9th century for the first Slavic literary language, called Old Slavonic. In the 10th century, Cyrillic script became used in Kievan Rus' to write Old East Slavic, from which the Belarusian, Russian, Rusyn, and Ukrainian alphabets later evolved. The modern Ukrainian alphabet has 33 letters in total: 21 consonants, 1 semivowel, 10 vowels and 1 palatalization sign. Sometimes the apostrophe (') is also included, which has a phonetic meaning and is a mandatory sign in writing, but is not considered as a letter and is not included in the alphabet.

In Ukrainian, it is called українська абетка (tr. ukrainska abetka, IPA: [ʊkrɐˈjinʲsʲkɐ ɐˈbɛtkɐ]), from the initial letters а (tr. a) and б (tr. b); алфавіт (tr. alfavit); or, archaically, азбука (tr. azbuka), from the acrophonic early Cyrillic letter names азъ (tr. az) and буки (tr. buki).

Ukrainian text is sometimes romanised (written in the Latin alphabet) for non-Cyrillic readers or transcription systems. There are several common methods for romanizing Ukrainian including the international Cyrillic-to-Latin transcription standard ISO 9. There have also been several historical proposals for a native Ukrainian Latin alphabet, but none have caught on.

== Alphabet ==
Ukrainian alphabet by position in alphabet, in both upper- and lower-case
Position	1	2	3	4	5	6	7	8	9	10	11	12	13	14	15	16	17	18	19	20	21	22	23	24	25	26	27	28	29	30	31	32	33
Uppercase	А	Б	В	Г	Ґ	Д	Е	Є	Ж	З	И	І	Ї	Й	К	Л	М	Н	О	П	Р	С	Т	У	Ф	Х	Ц	Ч	Ш	Щ	Ь	Ю	Я
Lowercase	а	б	в	г	ґ	д	е	є	ж	з	и	і	ї	й	к	л	м	н	о	п	р	с	т	у	ф	х	ц	ч	ш	щ	ь	ю	я

The alphabet comprises 33 letters, representing 40 phonemes. The apostrophe is also used in the spelling of some words, but is not considered a letter. Ukrainian orthography is based on the phonemic principle, with one letter generally corresponding to one phoneme. The orthography also has cases in which semantic, historical, and morphological principles are applied. In the Ukrainian alphabet the "Ь" could also be the last letter in the alphabet (this was its official position from 1932 to 1990).

Twenty-one letters represent consonants (б, в, г, ґ, д, ж, з, к, л, м, н, п, р, с, т, ф, х, ц, ч, ш, щ), ten represent vowels (а, е, є, и, і, ї, о, у, ю, я), and one represents a semivowel (й). The soft sign (ь), which appears only after consonants, indicates that the preceding consonant is soft (palatalized).

Also, alveolar consonants are palatalized when followed by certain vowels: д, з, л, н, р, с, т, ц and дз are softened when they are followed by a "soft" vowel: є, і, ю, я. See iotation.

The apostrophe negates palatalization in places that it would be applied by normal orthographic rules. It also appears after labial consonants in some words, such as ім'я "name", and it is retained in transliterations from the Latin alphabet: Кот-д'Івуар (Côte d'Ivoire) and О'Тул (O'Toole).

The apostrophe is used similarly in Belarusian orthography, while the same function is served in Russian by the hard sign (ъ): compare Ukrainian об'єкт and Belarusian аб'ект vs. Russian объект ("object").

There are other exceptions to the phonemic principle in the alphabet. Some letters represent two phonemes: щ /ʃt͡ʃ/, ї /ji/ or /jɪ/, and є /jɛ/, ю /ju/, я /jɑ/ when they do not palatalize a preceding consonant. The digraphs дз and дж are normally used to represent single affricates /d͡z/ and /d͡ʒ/. Palatalization of consonants before е, у, а is indicated by writing the corresponding letter є, ю, я instead (theoretical palatalization before и is not indicated as і already corresponds to the palatized or "soft" counterpart of и).

Compared to other Cyrillic alphabets, the modern Ukrainian alphabet is most similar to those of the other East Slavic languages: Belarusian, Russian, and Rusyn. It has retained the two early Cyrillic letters і (i) and izhe (и) to represent related sounds /i/ and /ɪ/ as well as the two historical forms e (е) and ye (є). Its unique letters are the following:

- ge (ґ), used for the less-common velar plosive /ɡ/ sound, whereas in Ukrainian the common Cyrillic г represents a glottal fricative, /ɦ/.
- yi (ї) /ji/ or /jɪ/.

== History ==
=== Early Cyrillic alphabet ===
The Cyrillic script was a writing system developed in the First Bulgarian Empire in the tenth century, to write the Old Church Slavonic liturgical language. It was named after Saint Cyril, who with his brother Methodius had created the earlier Glagolitic Slavonic script. Cyrillic was based on Greek uncial script, and adopted Glagolitic letters for some sounds which were absent in Greek – it also had some letters which were only used almost exclusively for Greek words or for their numeric value: Ѳ, Ѡ, Ѱ, Ѯ, Ѵ.

The early Cyrillic alphabet was brought to Kievan Rus' at the end of the first millennium, along with Christianity and the Old Church Slavonic language. The alphabet was adapted to the local spoken Old East Slavic language, leading to the development of indigenous East Slavic literary language alongside the liturgical use of Church Slavonic. The alphabet changed to keep pace with changes in language, as regional dialects developed into the modern Ukrainian, Belarusian and Russian languages. Spoken Ukrainian has an unbroken history, but the literary language has suffered from two major historical fractures.

Various reforms of the alphabet by scholars of Church Slavonic, Ruthenian, and Russian languages caused the written and spoken word to diverge by varying amounts. Etymological rules from Greek and South Slavic languages made the orthography imprecise and difficult to master.

Meletii Smotrytskyi's Slavonic Grammar of 1619 was very influential on the use of Church Slavonic, and codified the use of the letters Я (ya), Е (e), and Ґ (g). Various Russian alphabet reforms were influential as well, especially Peter the Great's Civil Script of 1708 (the Grazhdanka). It created a new alphabet specifically for non-religious use, and adopted Latin-influenced letterforms for type. The Civil Script eliminated some archaic letters (Ѯ, Ѱ, Ѡ, Ѧ), but reinforced an etymological basis for the alphabet, influencing Mykhailo Maksymovych's nineteenth-century Galician Maksymovychivka script for Ukrainian, and its descendant, the Pankevychivka, which is still in use, in a slightly modified form, for the Rusyn language in Carpathian Ruthenia.

=== Nineteenth-century reforms ===
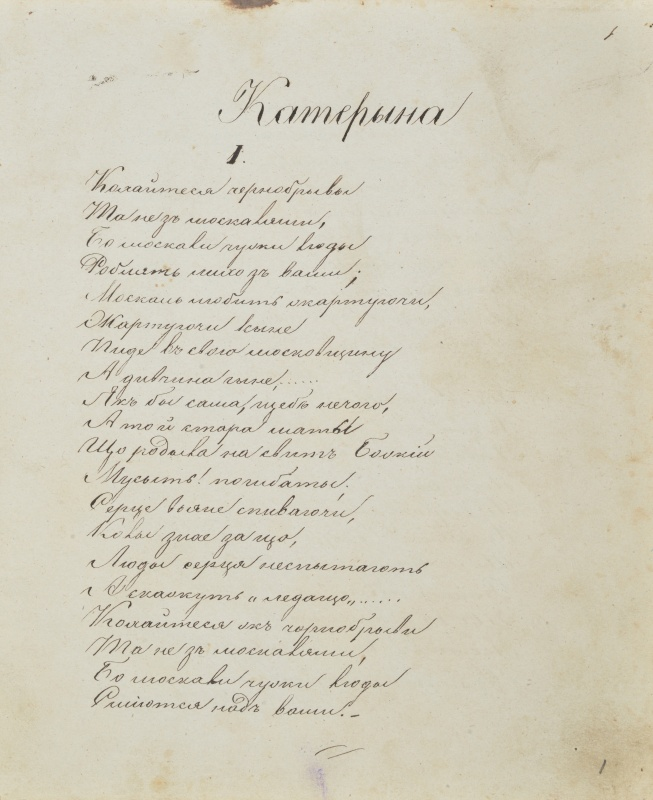
Handwritten poem "Kateryna", 1839, Taras Shevchenko, written in the Yaryzhka orthography

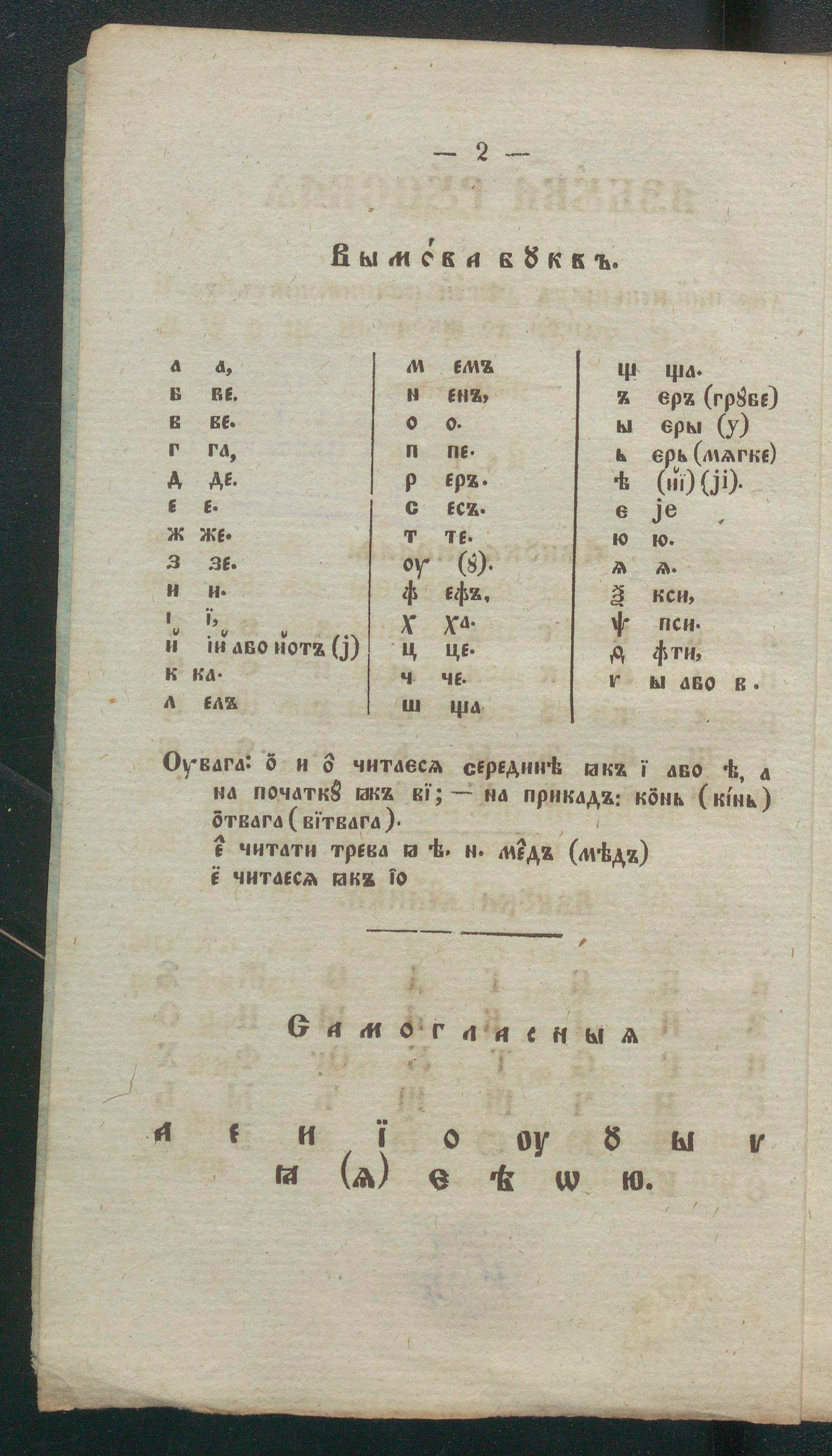
Elementary reading book for small children starting education - Levic'kij, Josif (1849) - included letters ѧ (ja), ö (equivalent to Slovak ô), ё (jo) and ѯ (ks).

In reaction to the hard-to-learn etymological alphabets, several reforms attempted to introduce a phonemic Ukrainian orthography during the nineteenth century, based on the example of Vuk Karadžić's Serbian Cyrillic. These included Panteleimon Kulish's Kulishivka alphabet used in his 1857 Notes on Southern Rus' and Hramatka, the Drahomanivka alphabet promoted in the 1870s by Mykhailo Drahomanov, and Yevhen Zhelekhivskyi's Zhelekhivka alphabet from 1886, which standardized the letters ї (yi) and ґ (g).

A Ukrainian cultural revival of the late nineteenth and early twentieth centuries stimulated literary and academic activity in both Dnieper Ukraine (formerly part of the Russian Empire) and western Ukraine (Austrian-controlled Galicia). In Galicia, the Polish-dominated local government tried to introduce a Latin alphabet for Ukrainian, which backfired by prompting a heated "War of the Alphabets", bringing the issue of orthography into the public eye. The Cyrillic script was favoured, but conservative Ukrainian cultural factions (the Old Ruthenians and Russophiles) opposed publications which promoted a pure Ukrainian orthography.

In Dnieper Ukraine, proposed reforms suffered from periodic bans of publication and performance in the Ukrainian language. One such decree was the notorious 1876 Ems Ukaz, which banned the Kulishivka and imposed a Russian orthography until 1905 (called the Yaryzhka, after the Russian letter yery ы). The Kulishivka was adopted by Ukrainian publications, only to be banned again from 1914 until after the February Revolution of 1917.

The Zhelekhivka became official in Galicia in 1893, and was adopted by many eastern Ukrainian publications after the Revolution. The People's Republic of Ukraine adopted official Ukrainian orthographies in 1918 and 1919, and Ukrainian publication increased, and then flourished under Skoropadsky's Hetmanate. Under the Bolshevik government of Ukraine, Ukrainian orthographies were confirmed in 1920 and 1921.

=== Unified orthography ===
In 1925, the Ukrainian SSR created a Commission for the Regulation of Orthography. During the period of Ukrainization in Soviet Ukraine, the 1927 International Orthographic Conference was convened in Kharkiv, from May 26 to June 6. At the conference, a standardized Ukrainian orthography and method for transliterating foreign words were established, a compromise between Galician and Soviet proposals, called the Ukrainian orthography of 1928, or Skrypnykivka, after Ukrainian Commissar of Education Mykola Skrypnyk. It was officially recognized by the Council of People's Commissars in 1928, and by the Lviv Shevchenko Scientific Society in 1929, and adopted by the Ukrainian diaspora. The Skrypnykivka was the first universally adopted native Ukrainian orthography.

However, by 1930 Stalin's government started to reverse the Ukrainization policy, partly attributing the peasant resistance to collectivization to Ukrainian nationalists. In 1933, the orthographic reforms were abolished, decrees were passed to bring the orthography steadily closer to Russian. His reforms discredited and labelled "nationalist deviation", Skrypnyk committed suicide rather than face a show trial and execution or deportation. The Ukrainian letter ge ґ, and the phonetic combinations ль, льо, ля were eliminated, and Russian etymological forms were reintroduced (for example, the use of -іа- in place of -я-). An official orthography was published in Kyiv in 1936, with revisions in 1945 and 1960. This orthography is sometimes called Postyshivka, after Pavel Postyshev, Stalin's official who oversaw the dismantling of Ukrainisation.

In the meantime, the Skrypnykivka continued to be used by Ukrainians in Galicia and the worldwide diaspora.

During the period of Perestroika in the USSR, a new Ukrainian Orthographic Commission was created in 1986. A revised orthography was published in 1990, reintroducing the letter ge ґ. It also revised the alphabetical order, moving the soft sign ь from the end of the alphabet, to a position before the letter ю, which helps sort Ukrainian text together with Belarusian (following a proposal by L. M. Ivanenko of the Glushkov Institute of Cybernetics).

On 21 May 2019, the Cabinet of Ministers of Ukraine approved a new version of the orthography prepared by the Ukrainian National Commission on Spelling. The new edition brought to life some features of orthography in 1928, which were part of the Ukrainian orthographic tradition. At the same time, the commission was guided by the understanding that the language practice of Ukrainians in the second half of the 20th century and the beginning of the 21st century has already become part of the Ukrainian orthographic tradition.

== Letter names and pronunciation ==
Letters and symbols of the Ukrainian alphabet
Upright	Most common transliteration	English equivalent (approximation)	Example in Ukrainian	Name	Traditional name	IPA	Etymology
А а	a	father, large	абетка (alphabet)	а /ɑ/	аз	/ɑ/	From the Greek letter alpha (Α α)
Б б	b	bad, big, bed	бабуся (grandmother)	бе /bɛ/	буки	/b/, /b˙/	From the Greek letter beta (Β β)
В в	v	water, while	віл (ox)	ве /wɛ/	віді	/w/, (Note: The pronunciation of /w/ varies depending on context; it is labial before back vowels and labiodental before front vowels. It is also vocalised to [u̯] in the syllable coda.) /u̯/, /ʋ/	From the Greek letter beta (Β β)
Г г	h	neighbourhood, hello	говорити (to talk)	ге /ɦɛ/	глаголь	/ɦ/	From the Greek letter gamma (Γ γ)
Ґ ґ (Note: Ge (ґ) was officially banned in Soviet Ukraine from 1933 to 1990; it is missing from some computer character encodings and fonts, such as ISO-8859-5 and MS-DOS Cyrillic.)	g	egg, gold	ґуля (lump)	ґе /ɡɛ/	—	/ɡ/	It comes from the italic variant of the Greek letter gamma (Γ γ). In the 14th century it was transmitted in writing by the digraph кг (кгрунт — ґрунт). It was used for the first time in the Peresopnytsia Gospel (1556–1561). Officially became a part of the alphabet in Meletius Smotrytsky's "Grammar" in 1616. Removed from the alphabet in 1933 as part of the Russification of Ukraine. Restored in the third edition of "Ukrainian orthography" in 1990. Rare, and only appears in non-native words and toponyms.
Д д	d	dog, doing	десь (somewhere)	де /dɛ/	добро	/d/, /dʲ/, /ɟː/, /d͡z/, /d͡zʲ/, /d͡ʒ/	From the Greek letter delta (Δ δ)
Е е	e	bed	церква (church)	е /ɛ/	єсть	/ɛ/, /ɛ̝/	From the Greek letter epsilon (Ε ε)
Є є	ye, i.e.	yellow, yes, yet	моє (my)	є /jɛ/	—	/jɛ/ or /ʲɛ/	Alluded to the Cyrillic letter Ѥ, but not directly derived from it. One of the variants of the Cyrillic letter е / є. It was first used in the spelling of "Русалка Днѣстровая" in 1837 to indicate the sounds [jɛ] and [ɛ] with a softening of the preceding consonant, before that it was used in Maksymovychivka instead of the modern e (жєньци — женці).
Ж ж	zh	pleasure, vision	авжеж (of course)	же /ʒɛ/	живіте	/ʒ/, /ʒʲː/, /d͡ʒ/	From the Glagolitic letter Zhivete (Ⰶ), that most likely comes from the Coptic letter janjia (Ϫ ϫ). There is no corresponding letter in the Greek alphabet.
З з	z	zoo	забавка (toy)	зе /zɛ/	земля	/z/, /zʲ/, /zʲː/, /d͡z/, /d͡zʲ/, /s/, /sʲ/	From the Greek letter zeta (Ζ ζ)
И и	y	mitt	писати (to write)	и /ɪ̈/	іже (осьмеричне)	/ɪ̈/, /ɪ/, /ɪ̞/	From the Greek letter eta (Η η)
І і	i	meet	ніч (night)	і /i/	і(жеї) (десятеричне)	/i/, /ʲi/	From the Greek letter iota (Ι ι), from the Phoenician yodh. Since 1818, the letter has been the only letter to indicate the sound /i/ in the Ukrainian language. Before that, the letters и, ѣ, ô, ê, û were used.
Ї ї	yi, i	yeast	країна (country)	ї /ji/	—	/ji/	The letter was officially introduced to the alphabet by P. Zhytetskyi and K. Mykhalchuk in 1874–1875. Before that, the letters ѣ, и and е were used (e.g. ѣжакъ — їжак, ии — її).
Й й	y, i	boy, toy	цей (this)	йот /jɔt/, й /ɪj/	—	/j/	The letter и with a breve. Borrowed from Greek, where it was used to indicate short sounds. For the sound /j/, the letter began to be used in M. Smotrytsky's "Grammar" since 1619.
К к	k	cat, king	канал (channel)	ка /kɑ/	како	/k/, /ɡ/	From the Greek letter kappa (Κ κ)
Л л	l	like	лити (to pour)	ел /ɛl/	люди(є)	/l/, /lʲ/, /ʎː/	From the Greek letter lambda (Λ λ)
М м	m	my	місто (city)	ем /ɛm/	мисліте	/m/	From the Greek letter mu (Μ μ)
Н н	n	never	вагітна (pregnant)	ен /ɛn/	нащ	/n/, /nʲ/, /ɲː/	From the Greek letter nu (Ν ν)
О о	o	long, more	вподобайка (like)	о /ɔ/	он	/ɔ/, /o/	From the Greek letter omicron (Ο ο)
П п	p	people	пес (dog)	пе /pɛ/	покой	/p/, /p˙/	From the Greek letter pi (Π π)
Р р	r	rolled r, Italian terra	родина (family)	ер /ɛr/	рци	/r/, /rʲ/	From the Greek letter rho (Ρ ρ)
С с	s	sea, so	серпень (August)	ес /ɛs/	слово	/s/, /sʲ/, /sʲː/, /z/, /zʲ/	From the Greek letter sigma (Σ σ/ς)
Т т	t	star, top	додаток (app)	те /tɛ/	твердо	/t/, /tʲ/, /cː/, /d/, /dʲ/	From the Greek letter tau (Τ τ)
У у	u	boot	дідусь (grandfather)	у /u/	ук	/u/, /u̯/	Originally it was a digraph of the Cyrillic letters О and Ѵ, which repeats the Greek way of denoting the sound [u] by combining the letters ου.
Ф ф	f	fight	фото (photo)	еф /ɛf/	ферт	/f/	From the Greek letter phi (Φ φ)
Х х	x, kh	ugh	хворий (sick)	ха /xɑ/	хір	/x/	From the Greek letter chi (Χ χ)
Ц ц	c, ts	sits	цукор (sugar)	це /t͡sɛ/	ци	/t͡s/, /t͡sʲ/, /t͡sʲː/	There is no exact version of the origin, letters similar in spelling existed in several ancient alphabets: in Ethiopian, Aramaic and alphabets derived from it, such as Hebrew and Coptic.
Ч ч	ch	chat, check	рукавичка (glove)	че /t͡ʃɛ/	черв	/t͡ʃ/, /t͡ʃʲː/, /d͡ʒ/	Possibly from the Hebrew letter tsade (צ), maybe it has the same origin as the letter ц. Francisk Skaryna used the Greek letter koppa (Ϙ ϙ) for the letter ч.
Ш ш	sh	shoes	шафа (wardrobe)	ша /ʃɑ/	ша	/ʃ/, /ʃʲː/	There is no exact version of the origin, letters similar in spelling existed in several ancient alphabets: the Ethiopian ε, Aramaic and alphabets derived from it, such as the Hebrew ש or the Coptic ϣ.
Щ щ	shch	fresh cherries, pushchair	борщ (Borscht)	ща /ʃt͡ʃɑ/	ща	/ʃt͡ʃ/	By origin, it is a ligature of the letters ш and т (in modern Bulgarian, the letter щ is still read as [ʃt]).
Ь ь (Note: The soft sign (ь) indicates the softening (palatalization) of the preceding consonant letter. It was at the end of the alphabet before 1990, when the new official orthography changed its position.)	ʹ	silent, palatalizes a consonant	кінь (horse)	м'який знак /mjɑˈkɪj ˈznɑk/	єрь	/ʲ/	It is most likely a modification of the Early Cyrillic О with a dash on top, or the Early Cyrillic letter І, that still exists in Ukrainian. The letter ь became the graphic basis for other Cyrillic letters, like ъ, ы and ѣ.
Ю ю	yu, iu	use	ключ (key)	ю /ju/	ю	/ju/, /ʲu/	Corresponds to the Greek letter combination οι (omicron and iota)
Я я	ya, ia	yard	я (I)	я /jɑ/	малий юс	/jɑ/, /ʲɑ/	Originally the Cyrillic "little yus" comes from a Glagolitic letter, that probably borrowed it from Greek ligatures like εν or ον. The modern form was introduced to the alphabet after Peter I's reforms.
'	ʺ	silent, prevents palatalization	м'ясо (meat)	апостроф /ɑˈpɔstrɔf/	—	— (Note: The apostrophe is used in Ukrainian as a hard sign analogous to the Russian letter ъ, indicating that the consonant preceding a soft vowel is not palatalized, when it otherwise would be.)	—

For other transliteration systems, see romanisation of Ukrainian.

Notes:

There are also digraphs which are pronounced as a single sound: ⟨дж⟩, which is pronounced /d͡ʒ/, like dg in knowledge, and ⟨дз⟩, which is realized as /d͡z/. Examples: джміль (dzhmil, "a bumble bee"), бджола (bdzhola, "a bee"), дзвоник (dzvonyk, "a bell").

== Historic letters ==
Upright	Italics	Most common transliteration	Modern Ukrainian equivalent	Name	IPA
Ѥ ѥ	Ѥ ѥ	ye, i.e., je	е, є	йотоване е	/jɛ/
Ѕ ѕ	Ѕ ѕ	z	з	(д)зіло	/z/, /zʲ/
Ѡ ѡ	Ѡ ѡ	o	о	омега, о	/o/
Ъ ъ	Ъ ъ	"	' (apostrophe)	жорсткий знак	—
Ы ы	Ы ы	y	и	єри	/ɪ/
Ѣ ѣ	Ѣ ѣ	ě	і	ять	/i/
Ꙗ ꙗ	Ꙗ ꙗ	ya, ia, ja	я	йотоване а	/jɑ/
Ѧ ѧ	Ѧ ѧ	ę	я	малий юс	/ɛ̃/
Ѫ ѫ	Ѫ ѫ	ǫ	у	великий юс	/ɔ̃/
Ѩ ѩ	Ѩ ѩ	yę	я	малий йотований юс	/jɛ̃/
Ѭ ѭ	Ѭ ѭ	yǫ	ю	великий йотований юс	/jɔ̃/
Ѱ ѱ	Ѱ ѱ	ps	пс	псі	/ps/, /psʲ/
Ѯ ѯ	Ѯ ѯ	ks	кс	ксі	/ks/, /ksʲ/
Ѳ ѳ	Ѳ ѳ	f	ф	фіта	/θ/, /f/
Ѵ ѵ	Ѵ ѵ	í, v	і, в	іжиця	/i/, /v/
Ё ё	Ё ё	yo, io, jo, ë	йо, ьо	йо	/jɔ/
Ў ў	Ў ў	w, ŭ	в	коротке у	/u̯/
Э э	Э э	e	e	e	/e/

== Letterforms and typography ==
In print, several lowercase Cyrillic letters resemble smaller versions of their corresponding uppercase forms.

Handwritten Cyrillic cursive letterforms vary somewhat from their corresponding printed (typeset) counterparts, particularly for the letters г, д, и, й, and т.

Like Latin script, whose typefaces have roman and italic forms, a Cyrillic type face (шрифт, shryft) has upright (прямий, priamyi) and cursive (курсивний, kursyvnyi) font forms, the latter of which later came to be called (письмівка, pys’mivka). Several lowercase letters in the cursive printed form bear little resemblance to the corresponding lowercase letters in the upright printed form, more closely resembling the corresponding handwritten lowercase cursive forms instead, particularly for the letters г, д, и, й, п, and т.

Quoted text is typically enclosed in unspaced French guillemets («angle-quotes»), or in lower and upper quotation marks as in German.

Ukrainian quotation marks in Unicode and HTML entities
standard	alternative
«цитата»	„цитата“
U+00AB U+00BB	U+201E U+201F
&#171; &#187;	&#8222; &#8223;

Reference: Bringhurst, Robert (2002). The Elements of Typographic Style (version 2.5), pp. 262–264. Vancouver, Hartley & Marks. ISBN 0-88179-133-4.

== Encoding Ukrainian ==
There are various character encodings for representing Ukrainian with computers.

=== ISO 8859-5 ===
ISO 8859-5 encoding is missing the letter ґ.

=== KOI8-U ===
KOI8-U stands for Код обміну інформації 8 бітний — український, "Code for information interchange 8 bit — Ukrainian", analogous to "ASCII". KOI8-U is a Ukrainianized version of KOI8-R.

=== Windows-1251 ===
Windows-1251 works for the Ukrainian alphabet, as well as for other Cyrillic alphabets.

=== Unicode ===
Ukrainian falls within the Cyrillic (U+0400 to U+04FF) and Cyrillic Supplementary (U+0500 to U+052F) blocks of Unicode. The characters in the range U+0400–U+045F are basically the characters from ISO 8859-5 moved upward by 864 positions.

In the following table, Ukrainian letters have titles indicating their Unicode information and HTML entity. In a visual browser you can hold the mouse pointer over the letter to see this information.

Ukrainian letters in the Unicode Cyrillic block
First 3 digits	Last digit															
First 3 digits	0	1	2	3	4	5	6	7	8	9	A	B	C	D	E	F
040	Ѐ	Ё	Ђ	Ѓ	Є	Ѕ	І	Ї	Ј	Љ	Њ	Ћ	Ќ	Ѝ	Ў	Џ
041	А	Б	В	Г	Д	Е	Ж	З	И	Й	К	Л	М	Н	О	П
042	Р	С	Т	У	Ф	Х	Ц	Ч	Ш	Щ	Ъ	Ы	Ь	Э	Ю	Я
043	а	б	в	г	д	е	ж	з	и	й	к	л	м	н	о	п
044	р	с	т	у	ф	х	ц	ч	ш	щ	ъ	ы	ь	э	ю	я
045	ѐ	ё	ђ	ѓ	є	ѕ	і	ї	ј	љ	њ	ћ	ќ	ѝ	ў	џ
046	Ѡ	ѡ	Ѣ	ѣ	Ѥ	ѥ	Ѧ	ѧ	Ѩ	ѩ	Ѫ	ѫ	Ѭ	ѭ	Ѯ	ѯ
047	Ѱ	ѱ	Ѳ	ѳ	Ѵ	ѵ	Ѷ	ѷ	Ѹ	ѹ	Ѻ	ѻ	Ѽ	ѽ	Ѿ	ѿ
048	Ҁ	ҁ	҂	҃	҄	҅	҆	҇	҈	҉	Ҋ	ҋ	Ҍ	ҍ	Ҏ	ҏ
049	Ґ	ґ	Ғ	ғ	Ҕ	ҕ	Җ	җ	Ҙ	ҙ	Қ	қ	Ҝ	ҝ	Ҟ	ҟ
04A	Ҡ	ҡ	Ң	ң	Ҥ	ҥ	Ҧ	ҧ	Ҩ	ҩ	Ҫ	ҫ	Ҭ	ҭ	Ү	ү
04B	Ұ	ұ	Ҳ	ҳ	Ҵ	ҵ	Ҷ	ҷ	Ҹ	ҹ	Һ	һ	Ҽ	ҽ	Ҿ	ҿ
04C	Ӏ	Ӂ	ӂ	Ӄ	ӄ	Ӆ	ӆ	Ӈ	ӈ	Ӊ	ӊ	Ӌ	ӌ	Ӎ	ӎ	ӏ
04D	Ӑ	ӑ	Ӓ	ӓ	Ӕ	ӕ	Ӗ	ӗ	Ә	ә	Ӛ	ӛ	Ӝ	ӝ	Ӟ	ӟ
04E	Ӡ	ӡ	Ӣ	ӣ	Ӥ	ӥ	Ӧ	ӧ	Ө	ө	Ӫ	ӫ	Ӭ	ӭ	Ӯ	ӯ
04F	Ӱ	ӱ	Ӳ	ӳ	Ӵ	ӵ	Ӷ	ӷ	Ӹ	ӹ	Ӻ	ӻ	Ӽ	ӽ	Ӿ	ӿ
050	Ԁ	ԁ	Ԃ	ԃ	Ԅ	ԅ	Ԇ	ԇ	Ԉ	ԉ	Ԋ	ԋ	Ԍ	ԍ	Ԏ	ԏ
051	Ԑ	ԑ	Ԓ	ԓ	Ԕ	ԕ	Ԗ	ԗ	Ԙ	ԙ	Ԛ	ԛ	Ԝ	ԝ	Ԟ	ԟ
052	Ԡ	ԡ	Ԣ	ԣ	Ԥ	ԥ	Ԧ	ԧ	Ԩ	ԩ	Ԫ	ԫ	Ԭ	ԭ	Ԯ	ԯ

=== Web pages and XML ===
Elements in HTML and XML would normally have the Ukrainian language indicated using the IETF language tag uk (lang="uk" in HTML and xml:lang="uk" in XML). Although indicating the writing system is normally not necessary, this can be accomplished by adding a script subtag, for example to distinguish Cyrillic Ukrainian text (uk-Cyrl) from romanized Ukrainian (uk-Latn).

== Keyboard layout ==
The standard Ukrainian keyboard layout for personal computers is as follows:

== See also ==
- Ukrainian phonology
- Cyrillic alphabets
- Euro-Ukrainian alphabet
- The hryvnia sign (₴) derives from the cursive minuscule letter He (г)
- Romanization of Ukrainian
- Scientific transliteration of Cyrillic
