= Draft Ukrainian orthography of 2003 =

The Draft Ukrainian orthography of 2003 (Ukrainian: Проєкт українського правопису 2003 року, romanized: Proiekt ukrainskoho pravopysu 2003 roku) was developed under the leadership of Academician of the National Academy of Sciences of Ukraine Vitalii Rusanivskyi by a group of members of the current Ukrainian National Commission on Orthography at the Ministry of Education and Science of Ukraine and the National Academy of Sciences of Ukraine. Authors of the draft: Vitalii Rusanivskyi (scientific editor), Bohdan Azhniuk, Svitlana Yermolenko, Natalia Nepyivoda, Oleksand Taranenko, Larysa Shevchenko and Larysa Shevchenko. Editing and computer processing of the text were performed by the Ukrainian Language and Information Fund of the National Academy of Sciences of Ukraine. Published in small editions in the Scientific and Publishing Center of the NBU. VI Vernadsky.

The project's proposals differ from others (Draft Ukrainian orthography of 1999, I. Yushchuk's Draft Spelling 2008) by their conservative attitude towards the current linguistic norm. It is not proposed to introduce intervocalic sounds (проект, діалектика), the optionality of the letter ґ is preserved (§§ 87-88), і- remains at the beginning of Ukrainian words (§ 3: інший, інколи), it is not proposed to write the word "пів" separately (§ 26: піваркуша, півгодини, пів'яблука, пів-Києва), in the nouns of the third declension is stored -і and so on.

The project pays considerable attention to streamlining the rules for the transfer of foreign and borrowed words. In particular, the doubling of consonants (in § 91 it is proposed to keep the doubling in infinitive words of Italian origin: барокко, стакатто, лібретто), the distinction of sounds I, Y (in §§ 92-93 in foreign proper names, and personal names and geographical names, is proposed to write -и- only after ж (дж), ч (щ), ш, with a few exceptions, which cancels the changes of the 1993 edition and returns the spelling: Ціцерон, Лейпціг, Корсіка, Сіракузи, Цюріх, Сан-Франціско, Цінціннаті, Оріноко, Рів'єра), transmission of foreign diphthongs (§§ 101-102), non-cancellation of words of foreign origin to vowels (§ 103). The project proposes to traditionally keep -й- in the position between vowels in proper names: "Гойя, Майя, Мейєрхольд, Німейєр, Тайюань, Фейєрбах, (Омар) Хайям, Хейєрдал and some others."

The draft did not become a valid spelling.

== Draft text ==
- Ukrainian orthography: draft / Vitalii Rusanivskyi and others; Ukrainian National Commission on Spelling. — K.: Scientific and Publishing Center of the NBU. Vernadskyi, 2003. - 168 p.
