= Pavlo Zhytetsky =

Pavlo Hnatovych Zhytetskyi
- Павло Гнатович Житецький
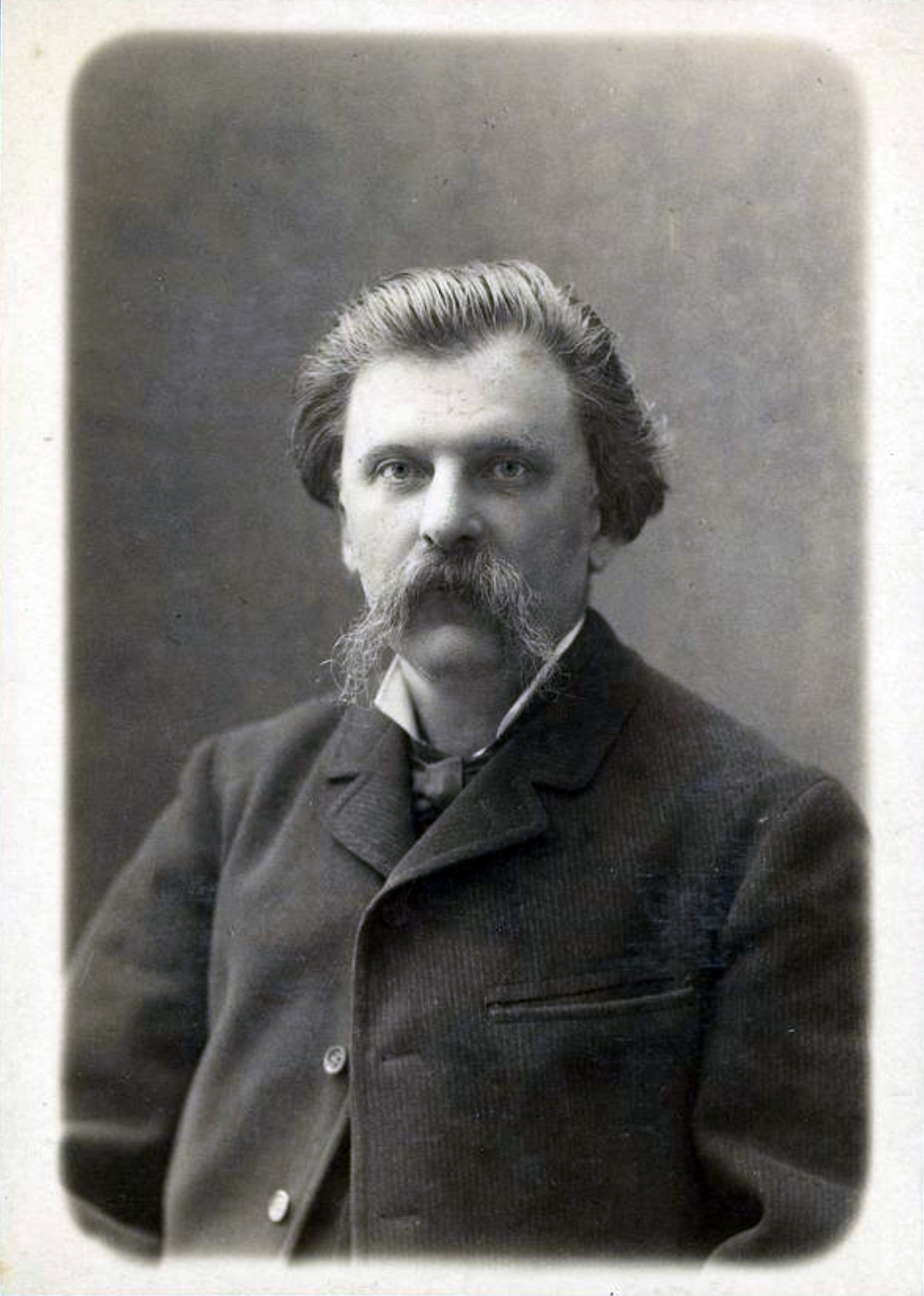
- Pavlo Zhytetskyi in 1911
- Born: January 4, 1837; Kremenchuk
- Died: March 18, 1911 (aged 74); Kyiv
- Occupations: Linguist, philologist, ethnographer, literary historian, teacher

Description of the 16th century Peresopnytsia manuscript

Pavlo Hnatovych Zhytetskyi (Ukrainian: Павло Гнатович Житецький; January 4, 1837 in Kremenchuk - March 18, 1911 in Kyiv) was a Ukrainian linguist, philologist, ethnographer and literary historian, Doctor of Russian Literature (1908). For a long time worked as a teacher of Russian language in Kamianets-Podilskyi and Kyiv.

He was a member of the Imperial Russian Geographical Society (starting in 1873), the Historical Society of Nestor the Chronicler (starting in 1879), the Shevchenko Scientific Society (starting in 1903), and the Ukrainian Scientific Society in Kyiv (starting in 1907), a corresponding member of the Russian Academy of Sciences (since 1898), he became the first honorary member of that society in 1908.

Pavlo Zhytetskyi is regarded as one of the first historians of the literary Ukrainian language.

== See also ==
- Drahomanivka
