= Drahomanivka =

Proposed reform of the Ukrainian alphabet

Drahomanivka (Ukrainian: драгоманівка, IPA: [drɐɦoˈmɑn⁽ʲ⁾iu̯kɐ]) was a proposed reform of the Ukrainian alphabet and orthography, promoted by Mykhailo Drahomanov. This orthography was used in a few publications and in Drahomanov's correspondence, but due to cultural resistance and political persecution it was never able to catch on.

It was a phonemic orthography, developed in Kyiv in the 1870s by a group of cultural activists led by Pavlo Zhytetsky and including Drahomanov, for the compilation of a Ukrainian dictionary. The 1876 Ems Ukaz banned Ukrainian-language publications and public performances in the Russian Empire, so cultural activity was forced to move abroad before this reform had a chance to be published.

Zhytetsky named this alphabet the Hertsehovynka, after the influence of the recent Serbian orthography of Vuk Karadžić, from Herzegovina. But Drahomanov first used it in a publication (Hromada, Geneva 1878), and it came to be popularly referred to as the Drahomanivka. It was used in Drahomanov's publications and personal correspondence, as well as in publications in Western Ukraine (Austro-Hungarian Galicia) by Drahomanov's colleagues Ivan Franko and Mykhailo Pavlyk (Hromadskyi Druh, Dzvin, and Molot, Lviv 1878). But these publications were opposed by conservative Ukrainian cultural factions (the Old Ruthenians and Russophiles) and persecuted by the Polish-dominated Galician authorities, and the orthography fell into obscurity.

== The alphabet ==
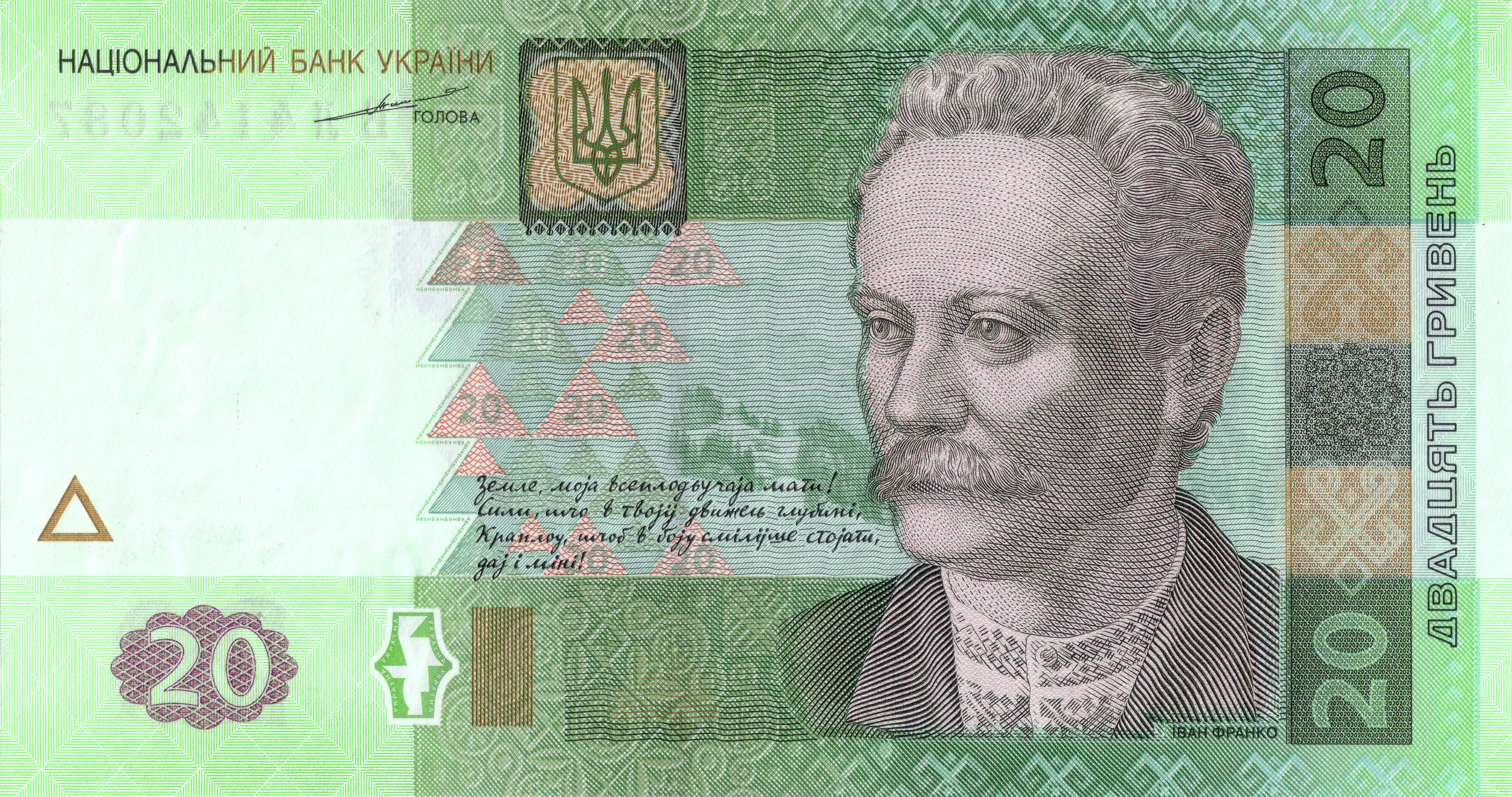
Ukrainian twenty-hryvnia banknote, bearing an example of Ivan Franko's poetry handwritten in the Drahomanivka

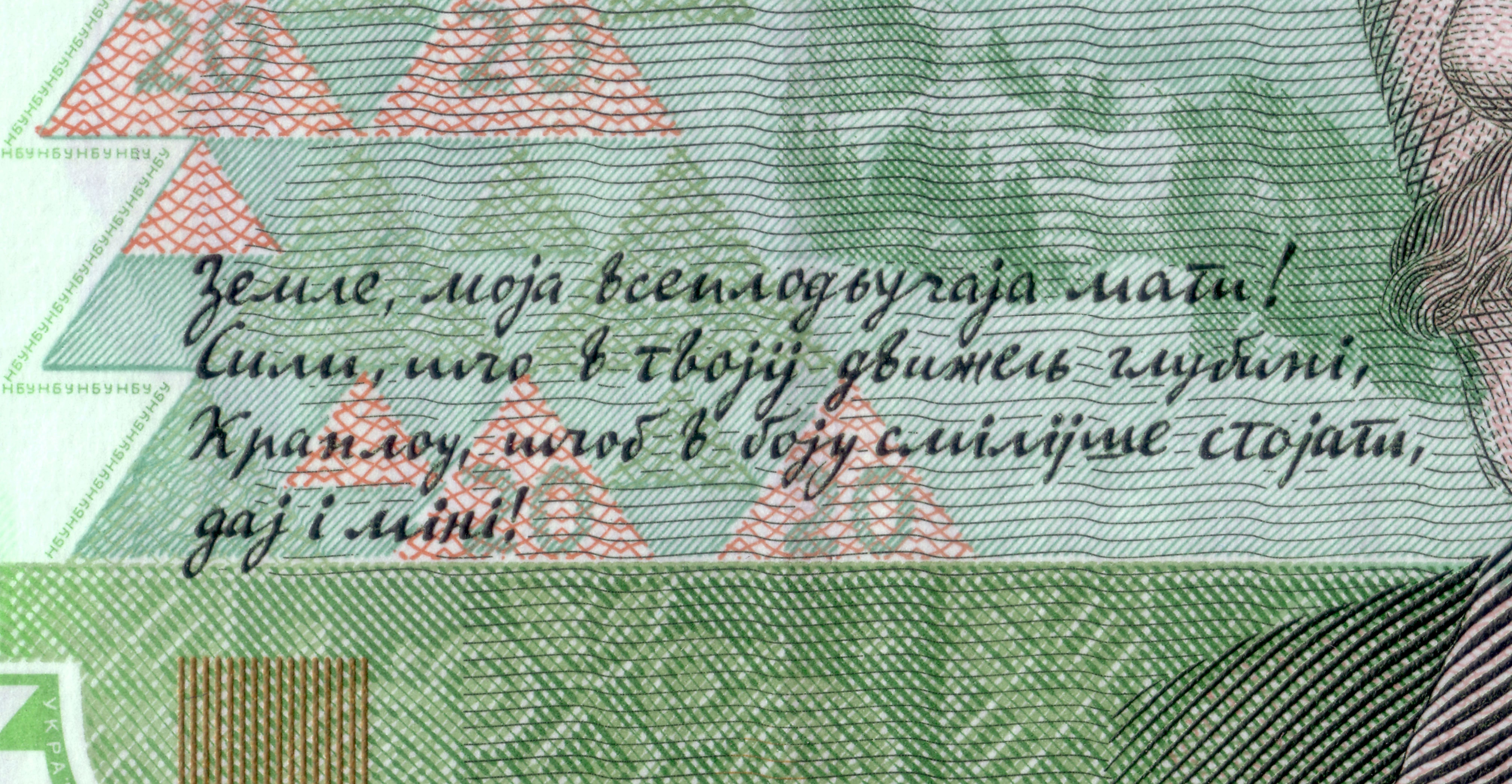
Detail of the banknote

The Drahomanivka was based on the phonemic principle, with each letter representing exactly one Ukrainian phoneme (one meaningful unit of sound). The letter ⟨щ⟩, which represents the sequence [ʃtʃ], was replaced by ⟨шч⟩. Palatalization was represented by the soft sign ⟨ь⟩, so after softened consonants ⟨я, є, ю⟩ were replaced with ⟨ьа, ье, ьу⟩. The semivowel [j], written ⟨й⟩, was replaced with the Latin ⟨j⟩; the sequences [jɑ, jɛ, ju, ji] were to be written ⟨ја, је, ју, јі⟩ instead of with the iotated vowels ⟨я, є, ю, ї⟩. Due to these changes the hard sign—then written ⟨ъ⟩ but later as an apostrophe ⟨'⟩—was superfluous and to be abandoned. The verb ending ‑ться was written ‑тцьа.

Examples:

- шчука (щука in the modern orthography, ščuka, 'pike')
- јаблуко (яблуко, jabluko, 'apple')
- свьатиј (святий, svjatyj, 'saint')
- сподівајетцьа (сподівається, spodivajet'sja, 'anticipates')

An example of the use of Drahomanivka was presented on the 2003 Ukrainian twenty-hryvnia banknote. It shows a fragment of Ivan Franko's poem "Veselka", written in the Drahomanivka, beside the poet's portrait:

Земле, моја всеплодьучаја мати!
Сили, шчо в твојіј движесь глубині,
Крапльу, шчоб в боју сміліјше стојати,
дај і міні!
