= Potebnia Institute of Linguistics =

Research institute in Ukraine

Coordinates: 50.450813°N 30.528620°E

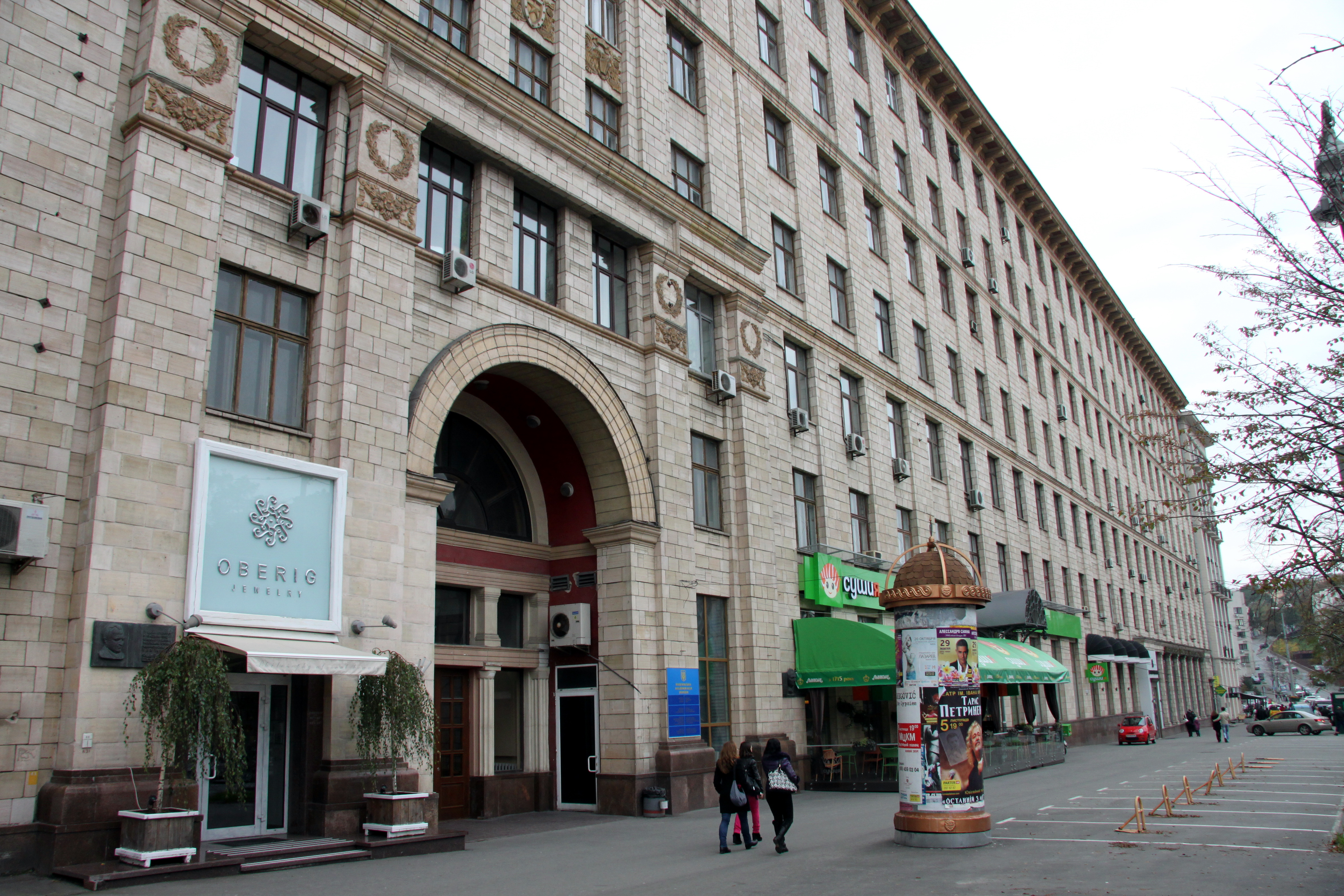
- Building where the institute is located (September 2013)
- Established: 1936
- Focus: Academic Institute
- Head: Vitaliy Sklyarenko
- Address: 4 Hrushevsky Street
- Location: Kyiv, Ukraine
- Website: inmo.org.ua

Potebnia Institute of Linguistics is a research institute in Ukraine, which is part of the National Academy of Sciences of Ukraine department of literature, language, and art studies. It is focused on linguistic research and studies of linguistic issues. The institute is located in Kyiv.

== History ==
The institute was established in 1930 after merging several smaller separate linguistic research institutions that existed in the 1920s, particularly the Institute of Ukrainian Scientific Language. The institute is named after Ukrainianist Alexander Potebnja (properly Olexander Potebnia). Due to political persecutions in the Soviet Union in the 1930s, the real work of the new institute did not start until after World War II. In the 1930s many members of the institute were tried at staged trials of the Union for the Freedom of Ukraine.

In 1991 the department of Ukrainian Studies was transformed into a separate Institute of Ukrainian Language.

== Departments ==
- General linguistics
- General Slavic languages issues and East Slavic languages
- West and South Slavic languages
- Russian language
- Romance, Germanic, and Baltic languages
- Languages of Ukraine

== Directors ==
- Mykhailo Kalynovych
- Leonid Bulakhovskyi
- Vitaliy Rusanivskyi
- Vitaliy Sklyarenko
- Bohdan Azhniuk

== Publications ==
- "Movoznavstvo"

== Building ==
Besides the Potebnya Institute of Linguistics, the building also houses two other research institutes of the National Academy of Sciences of Ukraine: the Shevchenko Institute of Literature and the Institute of History of Ukraine.

== Employees ==
At various times, the Institute has employed well-known linguists:

- А. Y. Krymsky
- E. K. Timchenko
- I. V. Sharovolsky
- О. N. Sinyavsky
- P. Y. Goretsky
- О. B. Kurylo
- M. Y. Kalynovych
- M. G. Grunsky
- L. A. Bulakhovsky
- I. M. Kirichenko
- А. O. Biletskyi
- M. A. Zhovtobryukh
- V. S. Ilyin
- I. A. Bagmut

== Gallery ==
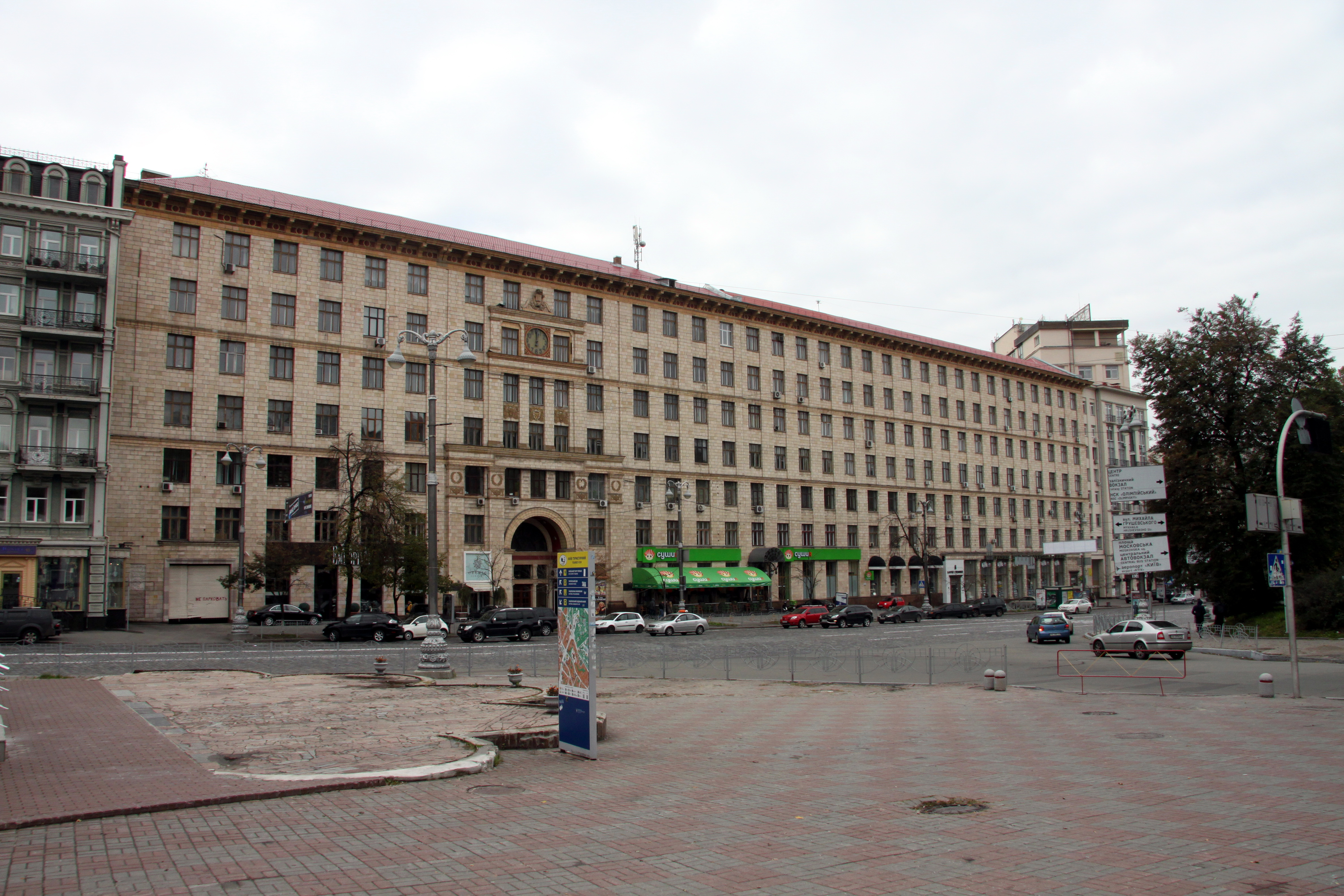
Shot from perspective of the Dynamo Stadium's entrance

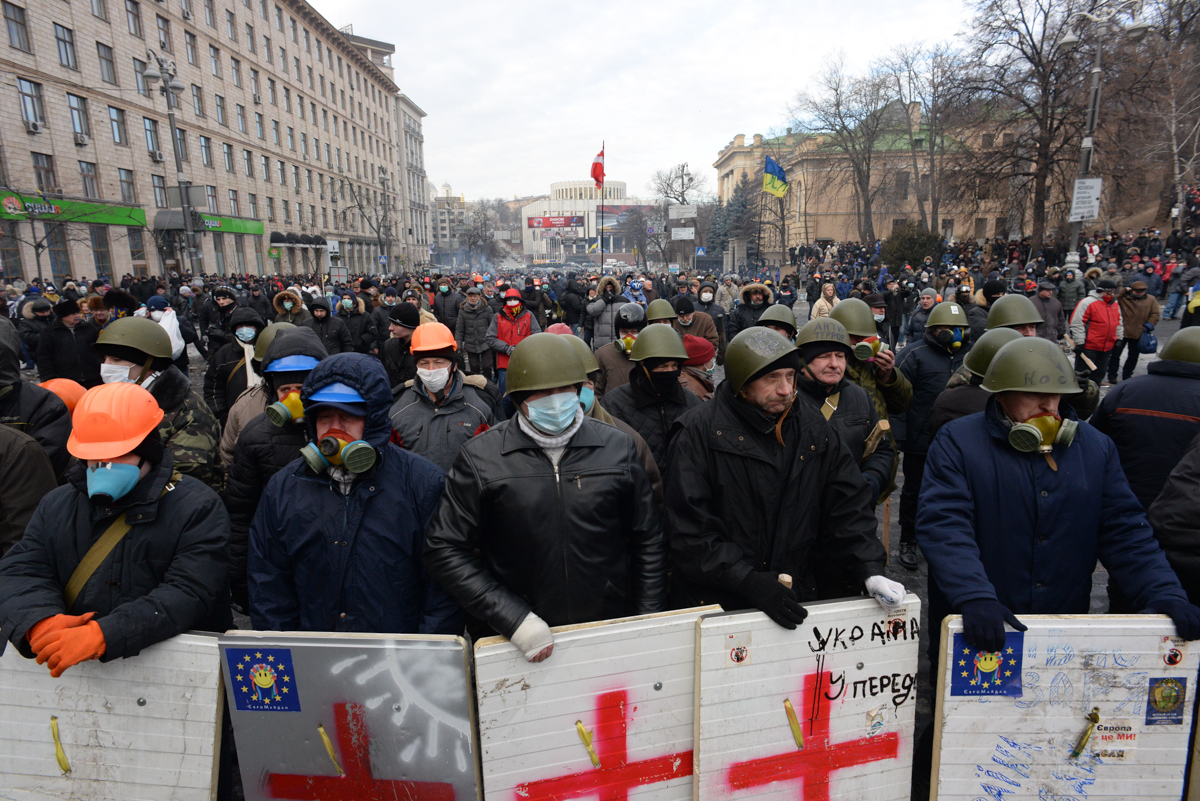
Euromaidan events near the building of the Institute

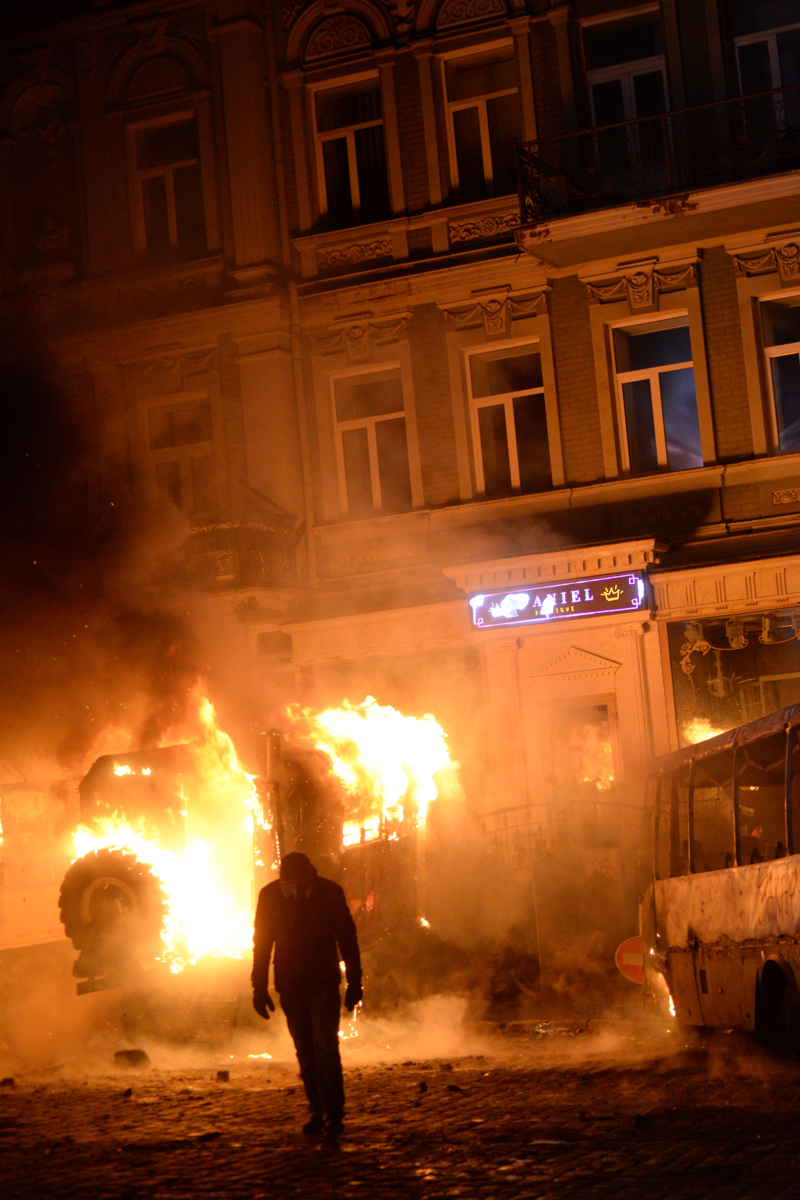
In the background, a building adjacent to the Institute's building

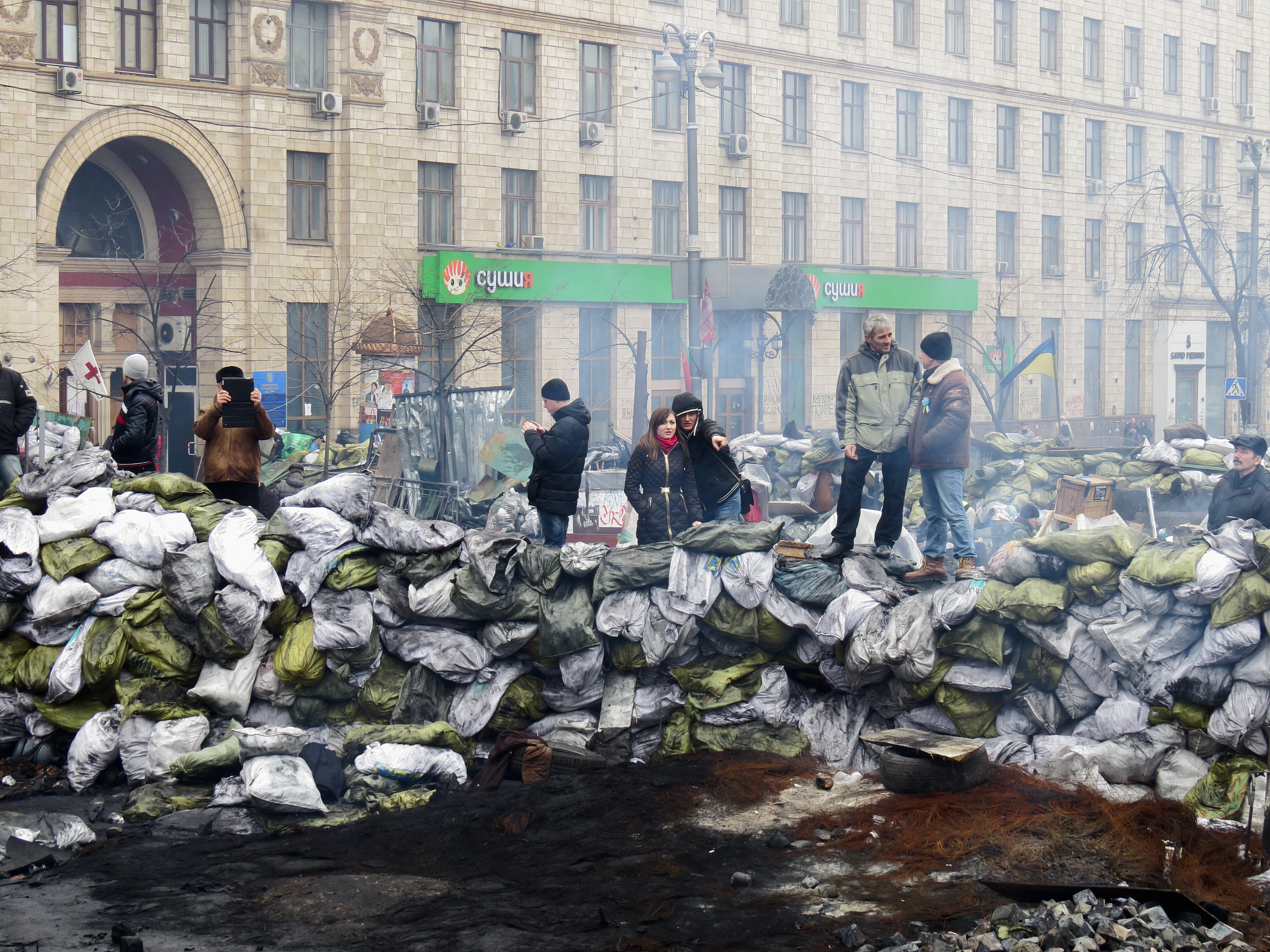
The building of the institute behind a barricade

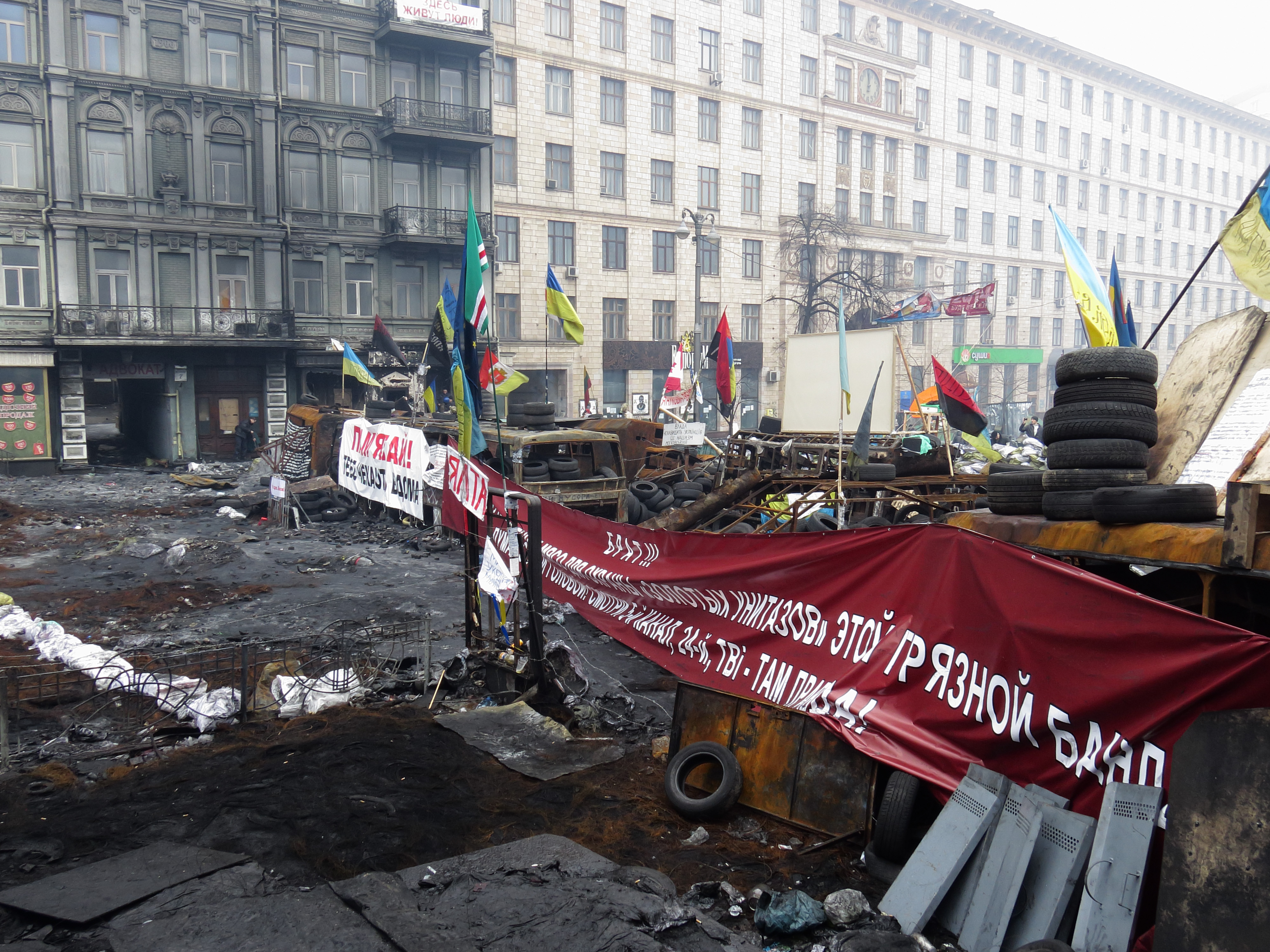
A barricade near the institute, February 2014

== See also ==
- 2014 Hrushevskoho Street riots
