= Ukrainian orthography of 1904 =

The Ukrainian orthography of 1904 (Ukrainian: Український правопис 1904 року, romanized: Ukrainskyi pravopys 1904 roku) is the official Ukrainian orthography in Austria-Hungary at the beginning of the 20th century. The spelling was officially formalized in the publication "Ruthenian orthography with a dictionary" (Ruthenian: Руська правопись зі словарцем), which was prepared and approved by the Shevchenko Scientific Society in Lviv. Not only Western Ukrainian linguists, but also scholars from Dnieper Ukraine, such as Ahatanhel Krymskyi, Yevhen Tymchenko, Mykhailo Hrushevskyi, and V. Doroshenko took part in the creation of this orthographic manual.

== Edition ==
- Ruthenian orthography with dictionary. Lviv: Shevchenko Scientific Society under the charge of K. Bednarskyi. 1904. 152 pages.
  - (reprint) Ruthenian orthography with dictionary. Укладачі: Stepan Smal-Stotskyi, Theodor Gartner. Winnipeg: Published by a Ruthenian bookstore. 1918. 152 pages. (3rd edition) (pdf on the e-bibl site. HathiThrust; pdf on the e-bibl site. archive.org)
