= Shashkevychivka =

Former orthography for the Ukrainian language

Shashkevychivka, Spelling of the Mermaid of the Dniester, and also Spelling of the Ruthenian Triad is the first phonetic spelling system for the Ukrainian language based on the adapted Cyrillic script, used by the Ruthenian Triad in the almanac "Mermaid of the Dniester" (1837). Markiian Shashkevych used to be considered the author of the spelling system used in "Mermaid of the Dniester", which is why it is called Orthography of Shashkevych or Shashkevychivka. The use of the phonetic principle of spelling was motivated in the foreword by Markiian Shashkevych by the fact that «we need to know what the true face is in the present language; because of this we follow the rule: „write as you hear, and read as you see“».

== Orthography features ==
- The letter ъ is not used at the end of words and as a punctuation mark (if necessary, it is replaced by a hyphen);
- the sound /ɪ/ (from the etymological и, ы) is transmitted by the letter и, and was used at the beginning of words according to the Ukrainian pronunciation of the words инший, и, Ирід, etc.
- /ɔ/ after soft consonants is transmitted as ьо, /jɔ/ as йо;
- the use of the letter ѣ is preserved, which was read according to the Ukrainian Church Slavonic tradition as /і/ (after vowels — /jі/ modern ї);
- the letter ѳ is preserved in some words of Greek origin;
- in many cases the sound /i/ from the ancient е is also transmitted as ѣ: нѣс-несу.
- /jі/ after vowels, etymologically unrelated to the historical ѣ, can be transmitted in two ways: as и or as ѣ (з Украини, з Украѣни);
- the sound /i/ from the ancient о (rarely from the ancient е) is transmitted by the letter і: ніс-носу.
- restored the letter є with its traditional spelling, which denoted traditionally /ɛ/; here it is used for the sounds /jɛ/ as in modern Ukrainian;
- introduced the letter ў for the labial–velar approximant /w/ place of the etymological /l/, as in the words ходил-ходиў, in modern spelling we write ходив.
- the letter џ was introduced for the sound /ʤ/ according to the Serbian model.

== Use and prevalence ==
Shashkevych's orthography was not instilled in Galicia, but became one of the foundations for the later systems of Ukrainian (Ruthenian) phonetic writing for the most part and, ultimately, of the modern Ukrainian alphabet and orthography.

== Examples of text ==
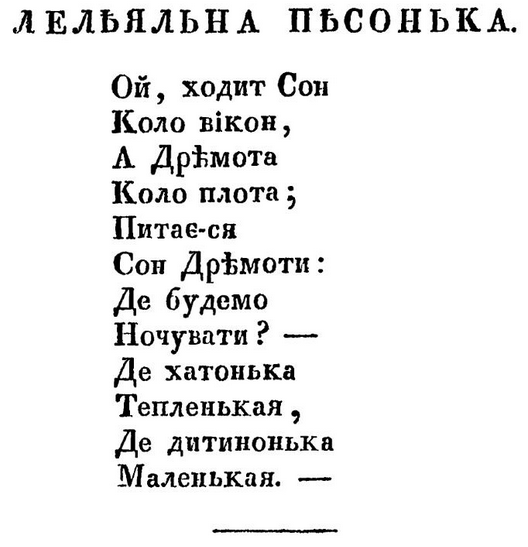
Fragment of page 35 of the almanac "Mermaid of the Dniester", 1837

Нарід Руский оден з головних поколѣнь Славяньских, в серединѣ меж ними, роскладаєся по хлѣбородних окресностьох з поза гір Бескидских за Дон. Він най ширше задержєў у своѣх поведѣнках, пѣсньох, обрядах, казках, прислівйох все, що єму передвѣцькі дѣди спадком лишили; а коли другіѣ племена Славлян тяглими загонами лютих чужоплеменників печалені бували, и чясто питомна власть рѣками крови теряних чяд пересякала, коли на послѣдок схилили вязи під окови залѣзні і лишилися самостоянства, Русь заступлена була Бескидами, що ся на низу ланцями повязали, и огорнена густими і великими рѣками, що як сестрицѣ почѣпляли-ся за руки…
