= Ghe with upturn =

Cyrillic letter

- Ґ ґ

Usage
- Writing system: Cyrillic
- Type: Alphabetic
- Language of origin: Ruthenian language
- Sound values: [ɡ]

History
Development
T14
      - Γ γ
        - Г г
          - Ґ ґ

Ge/ghe with upturn or Ge/ghe (Ґ ґ; italics: Ґ ґ) is a letter of the Cyrillic script.

== History ==
The common Slavic voiced velar plosive [ɡ] is represented in most Cyrillic orthographies by ⟨Г⟩, called ге, ge, in most languages. In Ukrainian, however, around the early 13th century, the sound lenited to the voiced velar fricative [ɣ] (except in the cluster *zg), and around the 16th century, debuccalized to the voiced glottal fricative [ɦ]. The phoneme continued to be represented by ⟨Г⟩, called ге, he, in Ukrainian.

Within a century after this sound change began, [ɡ] was re-introduced from Western European loanwords. Since then, it has been represented by several different notations in writing.

In early Belarusian and Ukrainian orthographies, Latin ⟨g⟩ or the Cyrillic digraph ⟨кг⟩ (kh) were sometimes used for the sound of Latin ⟨g⟩ in assimilated words. The first text to consequently employ the letter ⟨ґ⟩ was the 16th-century Peresopnytsia Gospel. The use of the letter was not confined to the Old- and Middle-Ukrainian-speaking territory, and there was a fully-fledged use in the 16th-century printer Pyotr Mstislavets's edition of The Four Gospels. Later, distinguishing of the sound and using the digraph gradually disappeared from Belarusian orthography.

As far as linguistic studies are concerned, the letter ⟨ґ⟩ was first introduced into the Slavic alphabet in 1619 by Meletius Smotrytsky in his "Slavic Grammar" (Грамматіки славєнскиѧ правилноє Сѵнтаґма). Later, for an identical purpose, it was saved in the new orthography of Ukrainian.

The letter ⟨ґ⟩ was officially eliminated from the Ukrainian alphabet in the Soviet orthographic reforms of 1933, to bring the Ukrainian language closer to Russian, its function being subsumed into that of the letter ⟨г⟩, pronounced in Ukrainian as [ɦ]. However, ⟨ґ⟩ continued to be used by Ukrainians in Galicia (part of Poland until 1939) and in the Ukrainian diaspora worldwide, who all continued to follow the Kharkiv orthography of 1928 (the so-called skrypnykivka, after Mykola Skrypnyk). It was reintroduced to Soviet Ukraine in a 1990 orthographic reform under glasnost, just before independence in 1991. A 2017 study of legal documents found that the letter had returned to active usage in Ukraine.

In Belarusian, the plosive realization of the Proto-Slavic voiced velar plosive has been preserved root-internally in the consonant clusters ⟨зг⟩, ⟨жг⟩, ⟨дзг⟩, and ⟨джг⟩ (in words such as мазгі [mazˈɡi], вэдзгаць [ˈvɛdzɡatsʲ] or джгаць [ˈdʐɡatsʲ] but not on a morphological boundary, as in згадаць [zɣaˈdatsʲ], in which /z/ is a prefix). It is present in common loanwords such as ганак [ˈɡanak] or гузік [ˈɡuzʲik]. In the 20th century, some Belarusian linguists, notably Jan Stankievič, promoted both the reintroduction of the practice of pronouncing Latin ⟨g⟩, at least in newly assimilated words, and the adoption of the letter ⟨ґ⟩ to represent it. However, consensus on this has never been reached, and the letter has never been part of the standard Belarusian alphabet and saw only sporadic periods of use. For example, a code of alternative Belarusian orthography rules, based on the proposal of Vincuk Viačorka and published in 2005, has the optional letter ⟨ґ⟩ included in the alphabet, but it can be replaced by ⟨г⟩.

== Usage ==
=== Belarusian ===
The letter ґ next to г is used in the so-called "Taraškievica" - the classical spelling of the Belarusian language.

An attempt to differentiate in writing the transmission of sounds /ɣ/ and /ɡ/, using along with the letter Г, г, a special letter Ґ, ґ, which differed in size and shape, took place in the history of the Old Belarusian language.

In A. Jelsky's publication in 1895, a new sign was introduced for the fricative /ɣ/ inherent in the Belarusian language, in contrast to the Russian breakthrough [g]. The new letter г̑ differed in contours from the letter Г, г by the presence of a diacritical mark in the form of a bracket bent downwards. In the publication of folklore and ethnographic work by A.K. Serzhputovsky in 1911, the sign Ґ, ґ with a curved upward horizontal line was proposed for the same purpose. The same sign was used in the alphabet of Kupala's collection in 1908 and became part of the alphabet approved by the first normative grammar of the Belarusian language by Branislaw Tarashkyevich, only with a different purpose: to convey a sonorous soft palate breakthrough /ɡ/. But in 1933 the letter Ґ, ґ, was excluded from the Belarusian alphabet, as well as from the Ukrainian one.

==== Belarusian classical orthography ====
§ 61. G When adopting foreign proper names, explosive /ɡ/ can be transmitted through a letter ґ (“ґе”): Ґіём, Ґасконь etc.

In the literary Belarusian language, an explosive sound /ɡ/ (and its soft equivalent /ɡʲ/) pronounced in Belarusian sound combinations [z̪ɡ], [d͡z̞ɡ, [d͡ʐɡ]: во[зґ]ры, ма[зґ’]і, ро[зґ’]і, абры[зґ]лы, бра[зґ]аць, пляву[зґ]аць, вэ[дзґ]аць, [джґ]аць and in a number of borrowed words: [ґ]анак, [ґ]арсэт, [ґ]валт, [ґ]зымс, [ґ]онта, [ґ]узік, а[ґ]рэст, [ґ’]ер[ґ’]етаць, цу[ґ]лі, шва[ґ’]ер etc. This marked the beginning of the restoration in the twentieth century of the use of the letter ґ, which was used in the Old Belarusian language.

In proper names with a non-Slavic lexical basis, explosive /ɡ/ is traditionally pronounced in Belarusian as fricative /ɣ/; preservation of /ɡ/ in pronunciation does not qualify as a violation of the orthoepic norm: [Г]арыбальдзі and [Ґ]арыбальдзі, [Г]рэнляндыя and [Ґ]рэнляндыя, [Г’]ётэ and [Ґ’]ётэ, [Г’]ібральтар and [Ґ’]ібральтар.

The sound [ɡ] in Belarusian also exists in place of etymological [k] before voiced consonants, as a result of assimilation. This assimilation is not reflected in writing, so the letter к is used in this case: анэкдот, вакзал, пакгаўз, экзамэн, эксгумацыя.

=== Rusyn ===
The letter Ґ ґ in the Rusyn language represents the voiced velar plosive /ɡ/.

=== Ukrainian ===
The letter Ґ ґ in the Ukrainian language represents the voiced velar plosive /ɡ/.

It is usually romanized as the letter g (while the letter Г г is transliterated as h, and Cyrillic Х х as kh or ch). Some European standards use ġ with a dot or g̀ with a grave accent (see Preußische Instruktionen, ISO 9).

It is still the rarest letter of the Ukrainian language, used only in a handful of native and long-borrowed words and toponyms of Ukraine. Transliterations and loanwords containing this sound still use the letter Г, and may also be pronounced with /h/.

==== Current orthography ====
§ 6. Letter Ґ

1. In Ukrainian and long-borrowed/Ukrainianized words: а́ґрус, ґа́ва, ґа́зда́, ґандж, ґа́нок, ґату́нок, ґвалт, ґе́ґати, ґедзь, ґелґота́ти, ґелґотіти, ґерґелі, ґерґота́ти, ґерґоті́ти, ґи́ґнути, ґирли́ґа, ґлей, ґніт (in the lamp), ґо́ґель-мо́ґель, ґонт(а), ґрасува́ти, ґра́ти (noun), ґре́чний, ґринджо́ли, ґрунт, ґу́дзик, ґу́ля, ґура́льня, джиґу́н, дзи́ґа, дзи́ґлик, дриґа́ти і дри́ґати, ремиґа́ти etc. and in their derivatives: а́ґрусовий, ґаздува́ти, ґвалтува́ти, ґе́рґіт, ґратча́стий, ґрунтови́й, ґрунтува́ти(ся), ґу́дзиковий, ґу́лька, проґа́вити etc.

2. In proper names – toponyms of Ukraine: Ґорґа́ни (massif), Ґоро́нда, У́ґля (villages in Zakarpattia), in the surnames of Ukrainians: Ґалаґа́н, Ґалято́вський, Ґе́ник, Ґерза́нич, Ґерда́н, Ґжи́цький, Ґи́ґа, Ґо́ґа, Ґо́йдич, Ґо́нта, Ґри́ґа, Ґудзь, Ґу́ла, Лома́ґа.

§ 122. Sounds [ɡ], [h]

1. The sound /ɡ/ and similar sounds denoted by the letter g are usually transmitted by the letter г: аванга́рд, агіта́ція, агре́сор, бло́гер, гва́рдія, генера́л, гламу́р, гра́фік, грог, емба́рго, марке́тинг, мігра́ція; лінгві́стика, негативний, се́рфінг, синаго́га, Вахта́нг, Гарсі́я, Гайнетді́н, Ердога́н, Гвіне́я, Гольфстри́м, Гренла́ндія, Гру́зія, Ге́те, Гео́рг, Гурамішві́лі, Люксембу́рг, Магоме́т, Фольксва́ген, Чика́го.

2. The letter ґ conveys the sound /ɡ/ in long-borrowed common names, such as ґа́нок, ґатунок, ґвалт, ґра́ти, ґрунт, etc. (see § 6) and their derivatives: ґа́нковий, ґратча́стий, ґрунто́вний etc.

3. In surnames and names of people it is allowed to transmit the sound /ɡ/ in two ways: by adapting to the sound system of the Ukrainian language – with the letter г (Вергі́лій, Гарсі́я, Ге́гель, Гео́рг, Ге́те, Грегуа́р, Гулліве́р) and by imitating a foreign language /ɡ/ – with the letter ґ (Верґі́лій, Ґарсі́я, Ге́ґель, Ґео́рґ, Ґе́те, Ґреґуа́р, Ґулліве́р etc.)

=== Urum ===
The letter Ґ ґ in the Urum language represents the voiced velar fricative /ɣ/.

== Form ==
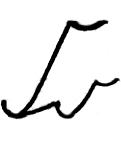
The cursive form in Ukrainian

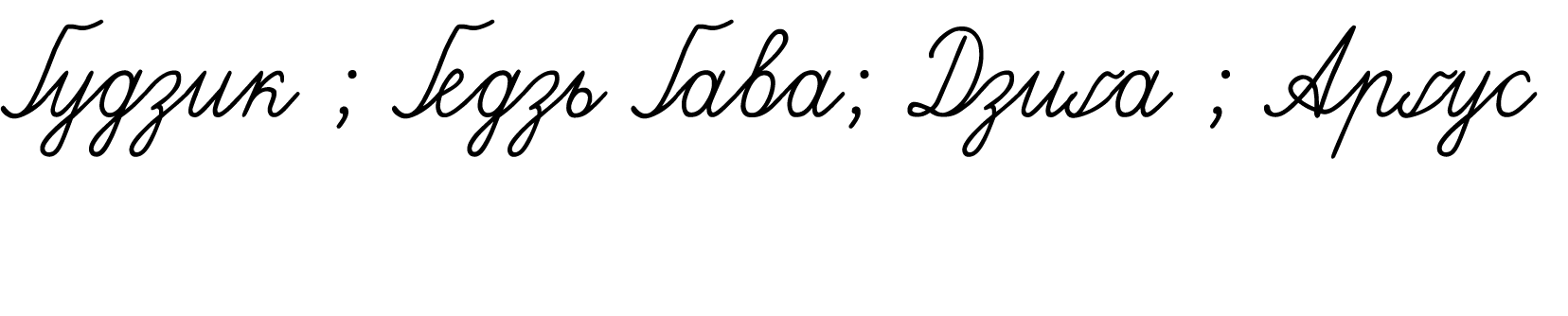
Examples of words using the letter Ґ in cursive writing.

Regular (non-cursive) uppercase and lowercase forms of this letter look similar to the corresponding regular (non-cursive) uppercase and lowercase forms of the letter Г г, but with additional upturn. Handwritten (cursive) uppercase and lowercase forms of this letter are displayed by the image to the left.

== Related letters and other similar characters ==
- Г г : Cyrillic letter Ge (distinguished and named He in the Ukrainian and Belarusian alphabets)
- Γ γ : Greek letter Gamma
- G g : Latin letter G
- Ġ ġ : Latin letter Ġ

== Computing codes ==
Character information
Preview	Ґ		ґ	
Unicode name	CYRILLIC CAPITAL LETTER; GHE WITH UPTURN		CYRILLIC SMALL LETTER; GHE WITH UPTURN	
Encodings	decimal	hex	dec	hex
Unicode	1168	U+0490	1169	U+0491
UTF-8	210 144	D2 90	210 145	D2 91
Numeric character reference	&#1168;	&#x490;	&#1169;	&#x491;
KOI8-U	189	BD	173	AD
Windows-1251	165	A5	180	B4
Macintosh Cyrillic	162	A2	182	B6
