= Soft sign =

Letter of the Cyrillic script

- Ь ь

Usage
- Writing system: Cyrillic
- Type: Alphabetic
- Language of origin: Old Church Slavonic, East Slavic languages
- Sound values: [◌ʲ]
- In Unicode: U+042C, U+044C

History
- Development: Ⱐ ⱐ: Ь ь

Other
- Associated graphs: ꚝ

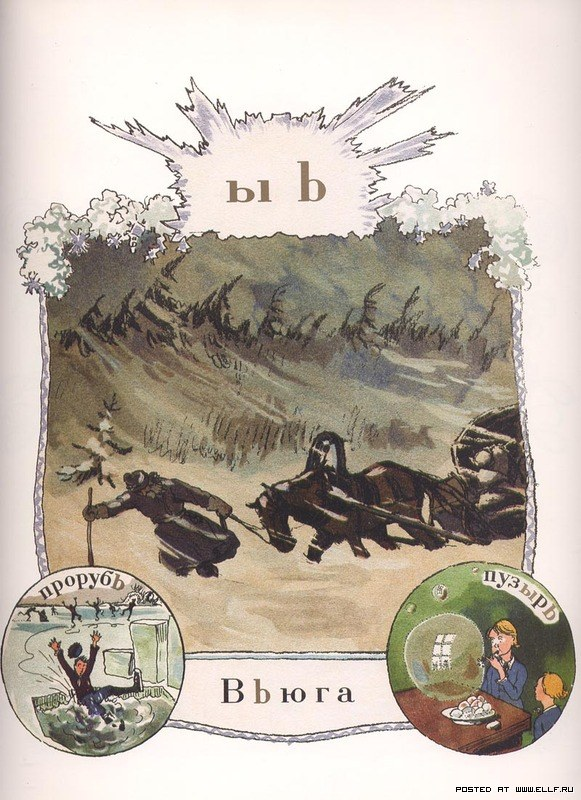
Soft sign, from Alexandre Benois' 1904 alphabet book. It shows prorub′ (ice-hole), v′yuga (snowstorm) and puzyr′ (bubble).

The soft sign (Ь ь; italics: Ь ь or Ь ь; italics: Ь ь) is a letter in the Cyrillic script that is used in various Slavic languages. In Old Church Slavonic, it represented a short or reduced front vowel. However, over time, the specific vowel sound it denoted was largely eliminated and merged with other vowel sounds.

In most contemporary Slavic Cyrillic writing systems, such as those used in East Slavic languages (Russian, Ukrainian, Belarusian) and Church Slavic, the soft sign does not represent a distinct sound on its own. Instead, it serves as an indicator of palatalization of the preceding consonant. In the Bulgarian language, it is only used to mark the palatalization of the preceding consonant when in front of the letter o, causing the combination ьо (/ʲo/). An example of this is the word гьол (/gʲol/).

Palatalization is a linguistic process in which the middle of the tongue moves closer to the hard palate while pronouncing a consonant. It affects the pronunciation of the preceding consonant by giving it a palatal quality or causing it to become a palatal consonant. The soft sign acts as a visual marker to show that the consonant before it is palatalized.

For example, in Russian, the soft sign is often used after consonants to indicate palatalization. It affects the pronunciation of the preceding consonant and can change the sound of words. The specific effect varies depending on the consonant it follows. In other Slavic languages where the soft sign is used, a similar palatalization function is observed.

It may also be used as a superscript (ꚝ) in Lithuanian dialectology.

== Uses and meanings ==
=== Palatalization sign ===
The soft sign is normally written after a consonant and indicates its softening (palatalization) (for example Ukrainian батько 'father'). Less commonly, the soft sign just has a grammatically determined usage with no phonetic meaning (like Russian: туш 'fanfare' and тушь 'India ink', both pronounced /tuʂ/ but different in grammatical gender and declension). In East Slavic languages and some other Slavic languages (such as Bulgarian), there are some consonants that do not have phonetically different palatalized forms but corresponding letters still admit the affixing soft sign.

The Serbian Cyrillic alphabet has had no soft sign as a distinct letter since the mid-19th century: palatalization is represented by special consonant letters instead of the sign (some of these letters, such as ⟨Љ⟩ or ⟨Њ⟩, were designed as ligatures with the grapheme of the soft sign). The modern Macedonian alphabet, based on the Serbian Cyrillic variant, has had no soft sign since its creation, in 1944.

=== Before a vowel in East Slavic languages ===
Between a consonant and a vowel, the soft sign bears also a function of "iotation sign": in Russian, vowels after the soft sign are iotated (compare Russian льют /lʲjut/ '(they) pour/cast' and лют /lʲut/ '(he is) fierce'). The feature, quite consistent with Russian orthography, promulgated a confusion between palatalization and iotation, especially because ⟨ь⟩ usually precedes so-called soft vowels. Combinations ⟨ья⟩ (ya), ⟨ье⟩ (ye), ⟨ьё⟩ (yo) and ⟨ью⟩ (yu) give iotated vowels, like corresponding vowel letters in isolation (and word-initially), and unlike its use immediately after a consonant letter in which palatalization can occur but not iotation. In those cases, ⟨ь⟩ may be considered as a sign indicating that a vowel after it is pronounced separately from the previous consonant, but that is the case neither for ⟨ьи⟩ (yi) nor for ⟨ьо⟩ (yo), because these vowels are not iotated in isolation. The latter case, though, is rarely used in Russian (only in loanwords such as ⟨бульон⟩) and can be seen as a replacement of phonetically identical ⟨ьё⟩, which gets rid of an "inconvenient" letter ⟨ё⟩. In Ukrainian and Bulgarian, the spelling ⟨ьо⟩ indicates palatalization, not iotation.

Known as the hard sign (Russian: твёрдый знак, romanized: tvjordyj znak, pronounced [ˈtvʲɵrdɨj ˈznak]), ⟨ъ⟩, an "unpalatalization sign", also denotes iotation, as in the case of ⟨ъя⟩, ⟨ъе⟩, ⟨ъё⟩ and ⟨ъю⟩ in Russian. It differs from the soft sign in that it does not necessarily soften the preceding consonant like the soft sign does (although consonants preceding the hard sign are still sometimes softened).

Similarly, the soft sign may denote iotation in Belarusian and Ukrainian, but it is not used so extensively as in Russian. Ukrainian uses a quite different repertoire of vowel letters from those of Russian and Belarusian, and iotation is usually expressed by an apostrophe in Ukrainian. Still the soft sign is used in Ukrainian if the sound preceded by an iotated vowel is palatalized.

=== In Bulgarian ===
Among Slavic languages using the Cyrillic script, the soft sign has the most limited use in Bulgarian: while phonemic palatalization does occur, it is very limited, even more than in other hard languages like Serbian (compare Bulgarian кон to Russian конь or Serbian коњ). The only possible position is one between consonants and ⟨о⟩ (such as in names Жельо, Кръстьо, and Гьончо, or the word синьо). Rather, the letter is mostly used in foreign words of French or German origin, such as шофьор (driver, chauffeur). There are almost no native Bulgarian words with the soft sign. The letter is sometimes used to represent some dialect pronunciations („твърдо нье“).

=== As a vowel in Slavic studies and in Old Church Slavonic ===
In Slavistic transcription, which is a system used to represent Proto-Slavic language, the Cyrillic letters Ь and Ъ are employed to denote extra-short vowel sounds known as yers. Ь represents the extra-short /ĭ/ sound, while Ъ represents the extra-short /ŭ/ sound. They were called ѥрь, jerь and ѥръ, jerъ respectively and corresponded to Glagolitic ⟨Ⱐ⟩ and ⟨Ⱏ⟩.

Proto-Slavic refers to the common ancestor of the Slavic languages, which was spoken around the 5th to 9th centuries AD. During this period, the Slavic languages were still in the process of diverging from a shared linguistic ancestor. Slavistic transcription aims to reconstruct the phonological features of Proto-Slavic based on historical and comparative linguistics.

The extra-short /ĭ/ sound represented by Ь was a front vowel, similar to the sound of "i" in the English word "bit." On the other hand, the extra-short /ŭ/ sound represented by Ъ was a back vowel, similar to the sound of "u" in the English word "put."

By utilizing Ь and Ъ in Slavistic transcription, linguists and researchers can indicate the presence of these extra-short vowel sounds in reconstructed Proto-Slavic words. This transcription system allows for a more accurate representation of the phonetic and phonological characteristics of the ancestral Slavic language.

=== Digraphs ===
In certain non-Slavic Cyrillic-based alphabets, such as Chechen, Ingush, and various Dagestanian languages like Tabasaran, the digraph ⟨аь⟩ is introduced to represent the sounds /æ/ or /a/. This combination of the letter "а" and the soft sign "ь" denotes a specific vowel sound. Similarly, the digraph ⟨оь⟩ is used for /œ/ or /ø/, and ⟨уь⟩ for /y/. Additional iotated forms like ⟨юь⟩ and ⟨яь⟩ are used as needed. This usage of the soft sign is similar to the trailing "e" in German when umlauts are unavailable.

This approach allows for the representation of specific vowel sounds in these non-Slavic languages using the available Cyrillic characters. The soft sign ⟨ь⟩, combined with other letters, creates digraphs to represent distinct phonemes that cannot be expressed by the bare letters alone.

There have also been proposals to use the ⟨аь⟩ digraph in Turkic languages as a replacement for Cyrillic schwa (Ә), which represents the sound /ə/ or /æ/. Only Nogai as a Turkic language uses this digraph. Unlike schwa, which may not be present in all Cyrillic character repertoires, both ⟨а⟩ and ⟨ь⟩ are commonly available letters in the basic modern Russian alphabet.

In addition to its use with vowels, the soft sign, like the hard sign and the palochka, is employed in many languages as digraphs to represent consonant sounds that are phonetically similar but distinct from the bare letter. For example, while the letter "г" represents the sound /g/, the combination "гь" represents /ɣ/ in Crimean Tatar, /ɦ/ in Archi, and /h/ in Avar and Tabasaran.

== Representations ==
Under normal orthographic rules, it has no uppercase form, as no word begins with the letter. However, Cyrillic type fonts normally provide an uppercase form for setting type in all caps or for using it as an element of various serial numbers (like series of Soviet banknotes) and indices (for example, there was once a model of old Russian steam locomotives marked "Ь" – ru:Паровоз Ь).

In the romanization of Cyrillic, the soft sign is typically transliterated with U+02B9 ʹ MODIFIER LETTER PRIME. Sometimes U+02BC ʼ MODIFIER LETTER APOSTROPHE is used, or the soft sign may be ignored if it is in a position that it does not denote iotation, for example: Тверь=Tver, Обь=Ob. It can also be transcribed "y" or "i" if preceding a vowel.

In Belarusian it is romanized as a combining acute, e.g., зь ⟨ź⟩, ць ⟨ć⟩, нь ⟨ń⟩, ль ⟨ĺ⟩.

== Name of letter ==
- Belarusian: мяккі знак, romanized: miakki znak, lit. 'soft sign', IPA: [ˈmʲakʲːi ˈznak]
- Bulgarian: ер малък, romanized: er malǎk, lit. 'small yer', IPA: [ɛr ˈmalɐk]; the hard sign ⟨ъ⟩ being named ер голям, er golyam, 'big yer'
- Russian Buryat: зөөлэн тэмдэг, romanized: zöölen temdeg, [zœːˈlɛn ˈtɛmdək]
- Church Slavonic: єрь, romanized: yerʹ
  - Old Church Slavonic: ѥрь, romanized: yerĭ, with unknown meaning
- Kalmyk: җөөлн темдг, romanized: cööln temdg, [d͡ʒœːˈlən tɛmˈdək]
- Kazakh: жіңішкелік белгісі, romanized: jıñışkelık belgısı, lit. 'sign of softness', IPA: [ʑɪŋɪɕkjɪlɪk bjɪlɡɪsɪ]
- Kyrgyz: ичкертүү белгиси, romanized: içkertüü belgisi
- Mongolian: зөөлний тэмдэг, romanized: zöölnii temdeg, IPA: [ˈt͡soːɮniː ˈtʰemteɡ]
- Romanian: семнул моале, romanized: semnul moale, lit. 'soft sign', IPA: [ˈsemnul ˈmo̯a.le]
- Russian: мягкий знак, romanized: myagkiy znak, lit. 'soft sign', IPA: [ˈmʲæxʲkʲɪj ˈznak]; or (archaic, mostly pre-1917 name) ерь, yer', IPA: [jerʲ]
- Serbian: танко јер, romanized: tanko jer, lit. 'thin yer'; or simply јер, jer, 'yer'; the hard sign ⟨ъ⟩ being named дебело јер, debelo jer, 'thick yer', or јор, jor, 'yor'
- Ukrainian: м’який знак, romanized: miakyi znak, lit. 'soft sign', IPA: [mjɐˈkɪj ˈznɑk]
- Uzbek: юмшатиш белгиси, yumshatish belgisi, IPA: [jʉmʃatɨʃ belɡisɨ]

== Related letters and other similar characters ==
- Latin letter B, which lowercase letter is nearly identical
- Ъ ъ : Cyrillic letter Hard sign
- Ҍ ҍ : Cyrillic letter Semisoft sign
- Ѣ ѣ : Cyrillic letter Yat
- Ы ы : Cyrillic letter Yery
- Љ љ : Cyrillic letter Lje
- Њ њ : Cyrillic letter Nje
- Ᲊ ᲊ : Cyrillic letter Tje
- , : I with bowl

== Computing codes ==
Character information
Preview	Ь		ь	
Unicode name	CYRILLIC CAPITAL LETTER SOFT SIGN		CYRILLIC SMALL LETTER SOFT SIGN	
Encodings	decimal	hex	dec	hex
Unicode	1068	U+042C	1100	U+044C
UTF-8	208 172	D0 AC	209 140	D1 8C
Numeric character reference	&#1068;	&#x42C;	&#1100;	&#x44C;
Named character reference	&SOFTcy;		&softcy;	
KOI8-R and KOI8-U	248	F8	216	D8
Code page 855	238	EE	237	ED
Code page 866	156	9C	236	EC
Windows-1251	220	DC	252	FC
ISO-8859-5	204	CC	236	EC
Macintosh Cyrillic	156	9C	252	FC

== See also ==
- Ğ
