= Belarusian alphabet =

Alphabet that uses letters from the Cyrillic script

- Script type: Alphabet
- Period: 10th century to present (Old East Slavic); modern orthography: since 1918
- Languages: Belarusian

Related scripts
- Parent systems: Egyptian hieroglyphs: Phoenician alphabet; Greek alphabet (partly Glagolitic alphabet); Early Cyrillic alphabet; Belarusian alphabet
- Sister systems: Belarusian Latin; Belarusian Arabic; Russian; Ukrainian

ISO 15924
- ISO 15924: Cyrl (220), Cyrillic

Unicode
- Unicode alias: Cyrillic
- Unicode range: subset of Cyrillic (U+0400...U+04FF)

The Belarusian alphabet is based on the Cyrillic script and is derived from the alphabet of Old Church Slavonic. It has existed in its modern form since 1918 and has 32 letters. See also Belarusian Latin alphabet and Belarusian Arabic alphabet.

== Letters ==
Belarusian Alphabet
Capital	Name	IPA	Unicode
А а	а [a]	/a/	U+0410 / U+0430
Б б	бэ [bɛ]	/b/	U+0411 / U+0431
В в	вэ [vɛ]	/v/	U+0412 / U+0432
Г г	гэ [ɣɛ]	/ɣ/	U+0413 / U+0433
Д д	дэ [dɛ]	/d/	U+0414 / U+0434
Е е	е [jɛ]	/jɛ/, /ʲɛ/	U+0415 / U+0435
Ё ё	ё [jɔ]	/jɔ/, /ʲɔ/	U+0401 / U+0451
Ж ж	жэ [ʐɛ]	/ʐ/	U+0416 / U+0436
З з	зэ [zɛ]	/z/	U+0417 / U+0437
І і	i, і дзесяцярычнае (decimal 'i')	/i/, /ʲi/, /ji/	U+0406 / U+0456
Й й	і нескладовае [i nʲɛsklaˈdɔvajɛ] (nonsyllabic 'i')	/j/	U+0419 / U+0439
К к	ка [ka]	/k/	U+041A / U+043A
Л л	эл [ɛl]	/l/	U+041B / U+043B
М м	эм [ɛm]	/m/	U+041C / U+043C
Н н	эн [ɛn]	/n/	U+041D / U+043D
О о	о [ɔ]	/ɔ/	U+041E / U+043E
П п	пэ [pɛ]	/p/	U+041F / U+043F
Р р	эр [ɛr]	/r/	U+0420 / U+0440
С с	эс [ɛs]	/s/	U+0421 / U+0441
Т т	тэ [tɛ]	/t/	U+0422 / U+0442
У у	у [u]	/u/	U+0423 / U+0443
Ў ў	у нескладовае [w nʲɛsklaˈdɔvajɛ] (nonsyllabic 'u') у кароткае [u kaˈrɔtkajɛ] (short 'u')	/w/	U+040E / U+045E
Ф ф	эф [ɛf]	/f/	U+0424 / U+0444
Х х	ха [xa]	/x/	U+0425 / U+0445
Ц ц	цэ [t͡sɛ]	/t͡s/	U+0426 / U+0446
Ч ч	чэ [t͡ʂɛ]	/t͡ʂ/	U+0427 / U+0447
Ш ш	ша [ʂa]	/ʂ/	U+0428 / U+0448
Ы ы	ы [ɨ]	/ɨ/	U+042B / U+044B
Ь ь	мяккі знак [ˈmʲakʲːi znak] (soft sign)	/ʲ/	U+042C / U+044C
Э э	э [ɛ]	/ɛ/	U+042D / U+044D
Ю ю	ю [ju]	/ju/, /ʲu/	U+042E / U+044E
Я я	я [ja]	/ja/, /ʲa/	U+042F / U+044F
’	апостраф [aˈpɔstraf]	–	U+0027, U+2019, or (rarely) U+02BC

== Details ==
Officially, the ⟨г⟩ represents both /ɣ/ and /ɡ/, but the latter occurs only in borrowings and mimesis. The ⟨ґ⟩ is used by some for the latter sound but, with the exception of Taraškievica, has not been standard.

A ⟨д⟩ followed by ⟨ж⟩ or ⟨з⟩ may denote either two distinct respective sounds (in some prefix-root combinations: пад-земны, ад-жыць) or the Belarusian affricates ⟨дж⟩ and ⟨дз⟩ (for example, падзея, джала). In some representations of the alphabet, the affricates are included in parentheses after the letter ⟨д⟩ to emphasize their special status: ⟨… Дд (ДЖдж ДЗдз) Ее …⟩.

⟨Ў⟩ is not a distinct phoneme but the neutralization of /v/ and /l/ when there is no following vowel, like before a consonant or at the end of a word.

Palatalization of consonants is usually indicated through choice of vowel letter, as illustrated here with /s/ and /sʲ/, both written with the letter ⟨с⟩:

Palatalization
Position	/s/	/sʲ/
Final	с	сь
Before /a/	са	ся
Before /ɛ/	сэ	се
Before /i/	сы	сі
Before /ɔ/	со	сё
Before /u/	су	сю

When a consonant is not palatalized and precedes /j/, the apostrophe ⟨'⟩ is used to separate the iotated vowel: ⟨с'я с'е с'і с'ё с'ю⟩ /sja sjɛ sji sjɔ sju/. (⟨і⟩ is the palatalizing version of ⟨ы⟩, and arguably, they represent a single phoneme). The apostrophe is not considered a letter and so is not taken into account for alphabetical order. In pre-Second World War printing, the form ⟨‘⟩ was used. When computers are used, the form is frequently substituted by ⟨'⟩ (straight apostrophe) or ⟨’⟩ (right single quotation mark).

== History ==
The early Cyrillic alphabet had 43 letters. Later, 15 letters were dropped, the last 4 after the introduction of the first official Belarusian grammar in 1918. Since four new letters were added, there are now 32 letters.

The new letters were:

- The ⟨э⟩ ((CYRILLIC) EH) appeared in Belarusian texts in about the late-15th century.
- The ⟨й⟩ ((CYRILLIC) SHORT I) evolved from ⟨и⟩ ((CYRILLIC) I), combined with a diacritical sign by the end of the 16th century.
- The ⟨ё⟩ ((CYRILLIC) IO) came from the Russian alphabet and introduced by Nikolay Karamzin in 1797.
- The ⟨ў⟩ ((CYRILLIC) SHORT U) was proposed by Russian linguist Pyotr Bezsonov in 1870.

The Belarusian alphabet, in its modern form, has formally existed since the adoption of Branislaw Tarashkyevich's Belarusian grammar, for use in Soviet schools, in 1918 Several slightly different versions had been used informally.

In the 1920s and notably at the Belarusian Academical Conference (1926), miscellaneous changes of the Belarusian alphabet were proposed. Notable were replacing ⟨й⟩ with ⟨ј⟩ ((CYRILLIC) JE), and/or replacing ⟨е⟩, ⟨ё⟩, ⟨ю⟩, ⟨я⟩ with ⟨је⟩ (or else with ⟨јє⟩), ⟨јо⟩, ⟨ју⟩, ⟨ја⟩, respectively (as in the Serbian alphabet), replacing ⟨ы⟩ with ⟨и⟩, introducing ⟨ґ⟩ (see also Ge with upturn; both proposed changes would match the Ukrainian alphabet) and/or introducing special graphemes/ligatures for affricates: ⟨дж⟩, ⟨дз⟩ etc. Even the introduction of the Latin script was contemplated at one moment (as proposed by Zhylunovich at the Belarusian Academical Conference (1926)). Nothing came of it.

Noted Belarusian linguist Yan Stankyevich in his later works suggested a completely different form of the alphabet:

Layout of the Belarusian alphabet (Stankyevich, 1962)
О о	А а	Э э	Б б	Г г	Ґ ґ	Х х
Д д	Е е	Ё ё	Я я	ДЗ дз	ДЖ дж	З з
Ж ж	І і	Й й	К к	Л л	М м	Н н
П п	Р р	С с	Ш ш	Т т	В в	У у
Ў ў	Ф ф	Ь ь	Ц ц	Ч ч	Ы ы	Ю ю

Note that proper names and place names are rendered in BGN/PCGN romanization of Belarusian.

== Keyboard layout ==
The standard Belarusian keyboard layout for personal computers is as follows:

== See also ==
- Belarusian orthography reform of 1933
- Cyrillic script
- Cyrillic alphabets
- Romanization of Belarusian
