= Second Ruthenian Oration on the Birth of Christ =

18th-century Belarusian satirical work

- Author: Anonymous
- Original title: Другая прамова Русіна аб нараджэнні Хрыста; Ulio Concio Ruthena pro Nativate Oni
- Language: Belarusian (in Latin script)
- Genre: Satire, oration
- Publication date: First half of the 18th century
- Publication place: Polish–Lithuanian Commonwealth

The Second Ruthenian Oration on the Birth of Christ (Belarusian: Другая прамова Русіна аб нараджэнні Хрыста; Latin: Ulio Concio Ruthena pro Nativate Oni (Domini)) is an anonymous satirical work of Belarusian literature from the first half of the 18th century. It is contained within a manuscript collection of works in Belarusian, Latin, and Polish (written between 1711 and 1741, partially published in 1965).

== Description ==
The text is written in the Belarusian language using the Latin script, interspersed with citations from religious literature in Latin, as well as Polish and Russian vocabulary. It is structured according to the canons of a church sermon, based on the traditional religious plot of "shepherds – sheep – wolves," but filled with contemporary social content.

The work reflects Enlightenment ideas and paradoxes, as well as the floridity of the Baroque style. It is believed to have been written by the same author as the Ruthenian Oration (Pramova Rusina).

== Literature ==
- Пашкоў, Г. П.; et al., eds. (1998). «Другая прамова Русіна аб нараджэнні Хрыста» ["Second Ruthenian Oration on the Birth of Christ"]. Беларуская энцыклапедыя: У 18 т. Т. 6: Дадаізм — Застава [Belarusian Encyclopedia: In 18 Vol. Vol. 6: Dadaism — Zastava] (in Belarusian). Мінск: БелЭн. p. 576. ISBN 985-11-0106-0.
