= Ruthenian Oration =

18th-century Belarusian satirical work

Concio Ruthena
- Author: Anonymous
- Original title: Прамова Русіна
- Language: Belarusian (in Latin script)
- Genre: Satire, oration
- Publication date: First half of the 18th century
- Publication place: Polish–Lithuanian Commonwealth

Concio Ruthena (Latin for Ruthenian Oration; Belarusian: Прамова Русіна, Pramova Rusina) is an anonymous satirical work of the first half of the 18th century with an anti-religious orientation. It was included in a manuscript collection of works in the Belarusian, Latin, and Polish languages (dated approximately 1711–1741). The text is written in the Belarusian Latin alphabet in the colloquial Belarusian language.

== Content and themes ==
The work is based on a narrative about the structure of the Universe, which the author imagines in the form of millstones (querns), where God "grinds" people. The "Oration" criticizes the reality of that time and the unjust distribution of material goods. It exposes religious dogmas and questions faith in divine justice.

The work is characterized by religious freethinking and uses Baroque allegory. It is believed to have been written by the same author as the "Second Ruthenian Oration on the Birth of Christ" (Druhaya pramova Rusina ab naradzhenni Khrysta).

== Literature ==
- Пашкоў, Г. П., ed. (2001). "«Прамова Русіна»". Беларуская энцыклапедыя: У 18 т. Т. 13: Праміле — Рэлаксін [Belarusian Encyclopedia: In 18 Vol. Vol. 13: Pramile — Relaksin] (in Belarusian). Мінск: БелЭн. p. 576. ISBN 985-11-0216-4.
- Мальдзіс, А. І. (1980). На скрыжаванні славянскіх традыцый [At the Crossroads of Slavic Traditions] (in Belarusian). Мінск: Навука і тэхніка.
- Гісторыя беларускай дакастрычніцкай літаратуры. Том 1 [History of Belarusian Pre-revolutionary Literature. Vol. 1] (in Belarusian). Мінск: Навука і тэхніка. 1968.
- Из истории свободомыслия и атеизма в Белоруссии [From the History of Freethought and Atheism in Belorussia] (in Russian). Мінск: Навука і тэхніка. 1978.
