= Belarusian Latin alphabet =

Latin alphabet for writing the Belarusian language

Biełaruskaja hramatyka dla škoł (Belarusian grammar for schools) (1918)

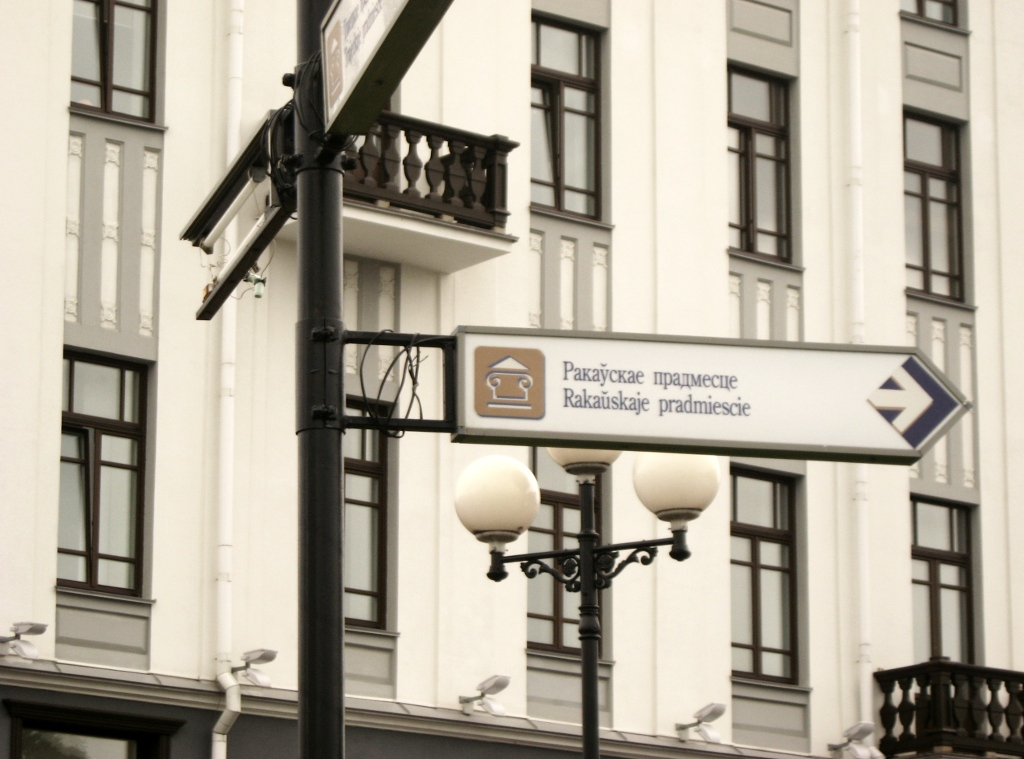
Biscriptal street sign in Minsk, Belarus.

Simultaneous use of the digraphs ''sz/cz'' and their replacement diacritics ''š/č'' in the same text in a Newspaper Jednaść.

The Belarusian Latin alphabet or Łacinka (from Belarusian: лацінка, BGN/PCGN: latsinka, IPA: [laˈt͡sʲinka]) for the Latin script in general is the Latin script as used to write Belarusian. It is similar to the Sorbian alphabet and incorporates features of the Polish and Czech alphabets. Today, Belarusian most commonly uses the Cyrillic alphabet.

== Use ==
The Ruthenian language, from which modern Belarusian originates, was originally written in the Cyrillic script. However, beginning in the 16th century, it came to be written in the Latin script as well, and the same practice was subsequently applied to some early writings in Belarusian. This is the origin of Łacinka. After the annexation of the Belarusian territory by the Russian Empire, Łacinka was completely banned by the Russian authorities during 1859-1905 in order to facilitate the switch to the Cyrillic script and preferably to the Russian language. This ban ended in 1905, resulting in the active concurrent use of both Łacinka and the Belarusian Cyrillic script in numerous books and newspapers until the 1930s. Though during the time of the occupation of the western part of Belarus by the German Empire in 1914-1918, the Łacinka script was the only one allowed to be studied on the "native language" lessons because the Cyrillic script was banned there.

Nowadays Łacinka is used occasionally in its current form by certain authors, groups and promoters in the Naša Niva weekly, the ARCHE journal, and some of the Belarusian diaspora press on the Internet.

The system of romanisation in the Łacinka is phonological rather than orthographical, and thus certain orthographic conventions must be known. For instance, the Łacinka equivalent to Cyrillic е can be je or ie, depending on its position in a word. Also, there is no soft sign in Łacinka; palatalisation is instead represented by a diacritic on the preceding consonant.

Belarusian Latin alphabet (as seen in publications, c.1990s–2000s)

Łacinka	Cyrillic	IPA
A a	А а	/a/
B b	Б б	/b/
C c	Ц ц	/ts/
Ć ć	Ць ць*	/tsʲ/
Č č	Ч ч	/tʂ/
D d	Д д	/d/
Dz dz	Дз дз	/dz/
Dź dź	Дзь дзь*	/dzʲ/
Dž dž	Дж дж	/dʐ/
E e	Э э	/ɛ/
F f	Ф ф	/f/
G g	(Ґ ґ)	/ɡ ~ ɟ/

Łacinka	Cyrillic	IPA
H h	Г г	/ɣ ~ ʝ/
Ch ch	Х х	/x ~ ç/
I i	І і*	/i/, /ʲ/
J j	Й й, ь*	/j/
K k	К к	/k ~ c/
L l	Ль ль*	/lʲ/
Ł ł	Л л	/l/
M m	М м	/m/
N n	Н н	/n/
Ń ń	Нь нь*	/nʲ/
O o	О о	/ɔ/
P p	П п	/p/

Łacinka	Cyrillic	IPA
R r	Р р	/r/
S s	С с	/s/
Ś ś	Сь сь*	/sʲ/
Š š	Ш ш	/ʂ/
T t	Т т	/t/
U u	У у	/u/
Ŭ ŭ	Ў ў	/w/
V v	В в	/v/
Y y	Ы ы	/ɨ/
Z z	З з	/z/
Ź ź	Зь зь*	/zʲ/
Ž ž	Ж ж	/ʐ/

* Cyrillic е, ё, ю, я are equivalent to je, jo, ju, ja initially or after a vowel, to e, o, u, a after the consonant l (ля = la), and to ie, io, iu, ia after other consonants.

* Cyrillic л is generally romanised as ł, but it is transliterated as l if it appears before ь, і, е, ё, ю, я, or another л followed by these letters.

Instruction on transliteration of Belarusian geographical names with letters of Latin script is similar to Łacinka, but transliterates Cyrillic л in different ways: л = ł (Łacinka) = l (geographical), ль = l (Łacinka) = ĺ (geographical), ля = la (Łacinka) = lia (geographical). This may become a source of confusion because, for example, the Łacinka spelling of the word "столь" is indistinguishable from the geographical transliteration of a different word "стол" as they both look like "stol". Whereas the changes of the actual Łacinka were never disruptive or ambiguous during its lifetime, digraphs sz/cz were even sometimes used along with their modernized diacritic š/č replacements in the same text.

== History ==
In the 16th century, the first known Latin renderings of Belarusian Cyrillic text occurred, in quotes of Ruthenian in Polish and Latin texts. The renderings were not standardised, and Polish orthography seems to have been used for Old Belarusian sounds.

In the 17th century, Belarusian Catholics gradually increased their use of the Latin script but still largely in parallel with the Cyrillic. Before the 17th century, the Belarusian Catholics had often used the Cyrillic script.

Cyrillic
а	б	в	г	д	е	ё	ж	з	зь	і	й	к	л	ль	м	н	нь	о	п
р	с	сь	т	у	ў	ф	х	ц	ць	ч	ш	ы	ь	э	ю	я			
c.1840s–c.1920s
Differences from the Polish alphabet: an extra optional letter "short U". But the graphic representation of this new letter wasn't standardized and looked different in the books published by different authors. Dunin-Marcinkievič used the cursive u. Alaksandr Rypinski used ŭ. And there were also variations with ú, û or no special markup at all.; Usage examples: Krótkie zebranie nauki chrzesciańskiey (1835), Hapon (1855), Dudka białaruskaja (1891), Alkahol (1913), newspaper Biełarus from 1913-1914 and a number of other books and newspapers.
a	b	w	h	d	je^{1}	jo^{1}	ż	z	ź	i	j	k	ł	l	m	n	ń	o	p
r	s	ś	t	u	u	f	ch	c	ć	cz	sz	y	–	e	ju^{1}	ja^{1}			
c.1907–c.1937
Differences from the earlier variant: ż=ž, cz=č, sz=š and standardized ŭ.; Usage examples: Kazka ab wadzie (1907), Jak prawilna pisać pa biełarusku (1917), Śledam za Chrystusam (1934), newspaper Krynica from 1917-1937 and many other books and newspapers.; Standards compliance: the original Taraškievica in the form of the Branisłaŭ Taraškievič's "Biełaruskaja hramatyka dla škoł" (1918) used this particular variant of Łacinka.
a	b	w	h	d	je^{1}	jo^{1}	ž	z	ź	i	j	k	ł	l	m	n	ń	o	p
r	s	ś	t	u	ŭ	f	ch	c	ć	č	š	y	–	e	ju^{1}	ja^{1}			
c.1937-now
Differences from the earlier variant: w=v.; Usage examples: "Zasieŭki: biełaruski lemantar dla chatniaha navučańnia" (1937), Biełaruski chryścijanski ruch (1939), newspaper Krynica from 1939-1940, newspaper Naša Niva № 18 from 1993.; Standards compliance: IETF language tag "be-Latn"
a	b	v	h	d	je^{1}	jo^{1}	ž	z	ź	i	j	k	ł	l	m	n	ń	o	p
r	s	ś	t	u	ŭ	f	ch	c	ć	č	š	y	–	e	ju^{1}	ja^{1}			
Notes
1. The variant with "j" was used at the start of words or after vowels, with "i" elsewhere.; The "soft sign" is denoted not by a separate grapheme but by using the "Ll" variant preceding it or by the acute accent over the preceding consonant.; The plosive sounds "g" ([ɡ] or [ɡʲ]), which are not represented in the standard Belarusian alphabet (see also Ge with upturn), has been proposed by some authors, including Jan Stankievič. It is not distinguished in Latin renderings at all, or it can be represented by either "Gg" or "HGhg".; The apostrophe is not used.

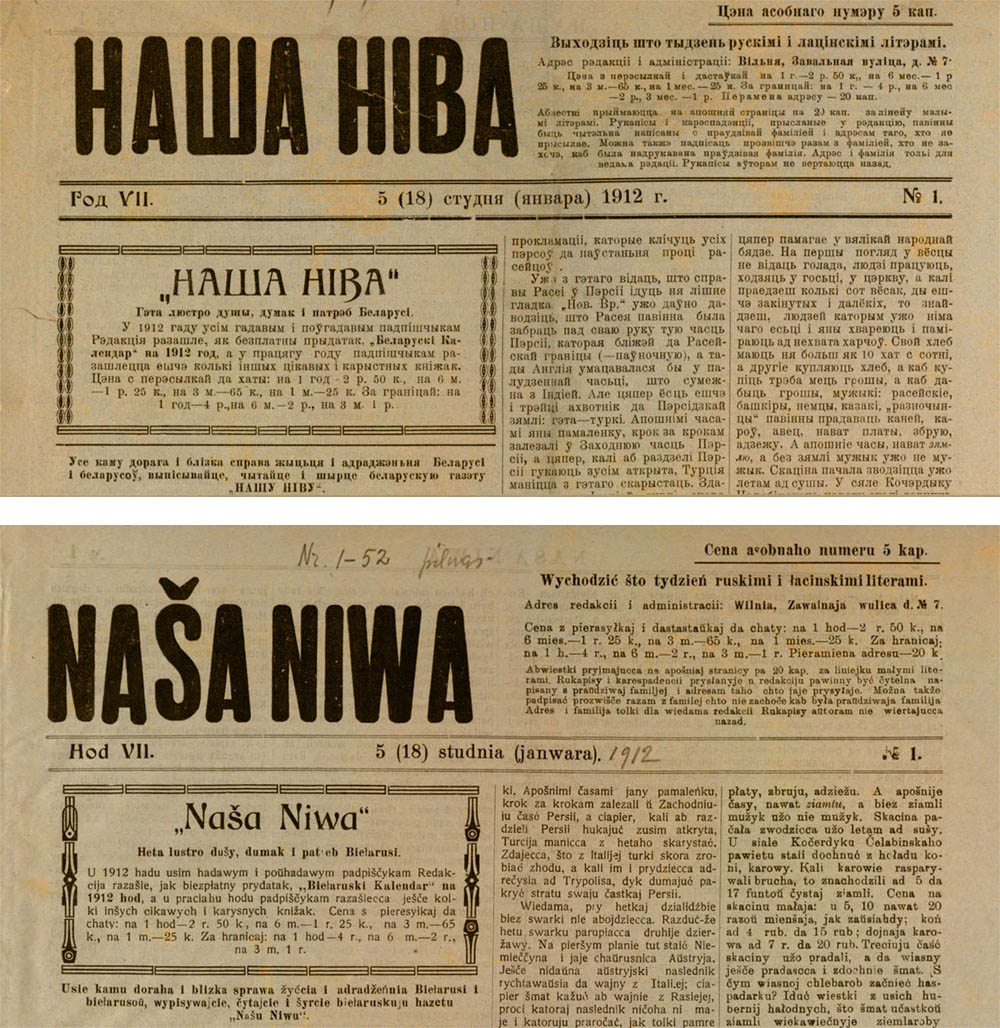
Naša Niva in Cyrillic and Latin scripts

In the 18th century, the Latin script was used, in parallel with Cyrillic, in some literary works, like in drama for contemporary Belarusian.

In the 19th century, some Polish and Belarusian writers of Polish cultural background sometimes or always used the Latin script in their works in Belarusian, notably Jan Čačot, Paŭluk Bahrym, Vincent Dunin-Marcinkievič, Francišak Bahuševič, and Adam Hurynovič. The Revolutionary Democrat Kastuś Kalinoŭski used only the Latin script in his newspaper Peasants’ Truth (Belarusian: Мужыцкая праўда, in Latin script: Mużyckaja prauda, or Mužyckaja praŭda; six issues in 1862–1863).

Such introduction of the Latin script for the language broke with the long Cyrillic tradition and is sometimes explained by the unfamiliarity of the 19th century writers with the history of the language or with the language itself or by the impossibility of acquiring or using the Cyrillic type at the printers that the writers had been using.

The custom of using the Latin script for Belarusian text gradually ceased to be common, but at the beginning of the 20th century, there were still several examples of use of the Latin script in Belarusian printing:

- Newspaper Naša Dola (1906).
- Newspaper Naša Niva (the issues during 10.11.1906 – 31.10.1912) — issues in both Cyrillic and Latin (with the subheading: Printed weekly in Russian and in Polish letters (in Latin script: Wychodzić szto tydzień ruskimi i polskimi literami)).
- Ciotka’s Belarusian Violin (Belarusian: Скрыпка беларуская, Skrypka biełaruskaja), Baptism to Freedom (Belarusian: Хрэст на свабоду, Chrest na swabodu) — books of poetry.
- Ciotka’s First reading for Belarusian children (Belarusian: Першае чытанне для дзетак-беларусаў, Perszaje czytannie dla dzietak-biełarusaŭ) — an attempt at creating a Belarusian elementary reading book.
- Janka Kupała’s Zither Player (Belarusian: Гусляр, Huslar; 1910) — book of poetry.
- rev. Balasłaŭ Pačopka’s Belarusian Grammar (1915, publ. in 1918) — Belarusian grammar, based entirely on Latin script, but is claimed by Belarusian linguists, however, to be prepared unscientifically and breaking the traditions of the Belarusian language. See also Belarusian grammar.

In the 1920s in the Belarusian SSR, like the Belarusian Academic Conference (1926), some suggestions were made to consider a transition of the Belarusian grammar to the Latin script (for example, Źmicier Žyłunovič for "making the Belarusian grammar more progressive"). However, they were rejected by the Belarusian linguists (such as Vacłaŭ Łastoŭski).

From the 1920s to 1939, after the partition of Belarus (1921), the use of a modified Latin script was reintroduced to Belarusian printing in Western Belarus, chiefly for political reasons. The proposed form of the Belarusian Latin alphabet and some grammar rules were introduced for the first time in the 5th (unofficial) edition of Taraškievič's grammar (Vilnia, 1929).

Belarusian Latin alphabet (Taraškievič, 1929)
A a	B b	C c	Ć ć	Č č	D d	E e	F f	G g	H h
I i	J j	K k	L l	Ł ł	M m	N n	Ń ń	O o	P p
R r	S s	Ś ś	Š š	T t	U u	Ŭ ŭ	W w	Y y	Z z
Ź ź	Ž ž								

Belarusian was written in the Latin script in 1941 to 1944 in the German-occupied Belarusian territories and by the Belarusian diaspora in Prague (1920s – c.1945).

After the Second World War, Belarusian was occasionally written in the Latin script by the Belarusian diaspora in Western Europe and the Americas (notably in West Germany and the United States). In 1962, Jan Stankievič proposed a completely new Belarusian Latin alphabet.

Belarusian Latin alphabet (Stankievič, 1962)
O o	A a	E e	B b	C c	Ć ć	Č č	D d	F f	G g
H h	Ch ch	I i	J j	K k	L l	Ł ł	M m	N n	Ń ń
P p	R r	Ś ś	Š š	T t	V v	U u	Ŭ ŭ	Dz dz	Dź dź
Dž dž	Z z	Ź ź	Ž ž						

== Today ==
Nowadays, Łacinka is used rarely apart from some posters and badges. Yet, some books continue to be published in this script. For instance:

- Uładzimir Arłoŭ. 2015. Patria Aeterna. Apaviadańni [Patria Aeterna: Short Stories]. Minsk: A. N. Varaksin. ISBN 9789857128129
- Ričardas Gavelis. 2018. Vilenski pokier [Vilnius Poker] (translated from the Lithuanian by Paŭlina Vituščanka). Vilnius: Logvino literatūros namai and Minsk: Lohvinaŭ. ISBN 9786098213249. NB: The paper book was published in Cyrillic in Taraškievica. Yet, the ebook is available in three orthographically and scriptaly different versions, namely, also in Łacinka and official orthography, apart from the faithful copy of the paper edition.
- Alhierd Bacharevič. 2022. Vieršy Вершы [Poems]. Prague: Vydaviectva Viasna Выдавецтва Вясна.ISBN 9788090735958, 142pp. NB: Each poem is given in Łacinka and Cyrillic.
- Uładzimir Arłoŭ. 2024. Śvieciacca vokny dy nikoha za jimi [Light in the Windows, but No One is There]. Białystok: Fundacja Kamunikat.org. ISBN 9788367937313, 226pp.
- In Vilnius since 1997 the magazine Рунь (Ruń, ISNN 1392-7671) has been published; recent issues of which include articles in both Cyrillic Taraškievica and Łacinka.
- Digital collection of the archives of the Vilnius Belarusian Museum contains a tag for manuscripts and books in Belarusian Latin script

In late 2021 a VK project of the Latin alphabet-based Belarusian Wikipedia, that is, the Biełaruskaja Wikipedyja łacinkaj, commenced.

On the occasion of the International Mother Language Day (February 21) in 2023, a machine-converted website edition of Naša Niva in Łacinka was launched.

== See also ==
- Romanization of Belarusian
- Instruction on transliteration of Belarusian geographical names with letters of Latin script
- Russian Latin alphabet
- Ukrainian Latin alphabet
