= Belarusian grammar =

Grammatical rules of the Belarusian language

The grammar of the Belarusian language is mostly synthetic and partly analytic, and norms of the modern language were adopted in 1959. Belarusian orthography is mainly based on the Belarusian folk dialects of the Minsk-Vilnius region, such as they were at the beginning of the 20th century. Initially, Belarusian grammar was formalised by notable Belarusian linguist Branislaw Tarashkyevich and first printed in Vil'nya (1918). Historically, there had existed several other alternative Belarusian grammars.

See also: Belarusian alphabet, Belarusian phonology, History of the Belarusian language.

== Features ==
A speaker of Belarusian language

=== Grammatical system ===
The main means of representation of the grammatical meanings in the Belarusian language are:

- affixes — "стол – стала", "кідаць – кінуць";
- suppletivism — "я – мяне", "чалавек – людзі", "браць – узяць";
- intonation — "ён гэта зрабіў – ён гэта зрабіў?";
- function words — "чытаў бы", "будзеш ведаць";
- root combining — "хадзіцьму = хадзіць+іму – маю хадзіць";
- reduplication — "белы-белы";
- order of words — "цікавая кніга – кніга цікавая".

Methods of analytical construction are also present. E.g., the word "лесам", which is the instrumental of "лес" — forest, may grammatically mean:

- circumstance, if used with verbs of motion — "ехаць лесам";
- specification, if together with other verbs — "валодаць лесам".

=== Nouns ===
There are six cases in Belarusian:

- Nominative (Belarusian: назоўны, BGN/PCGN: nazowny)
- Genitive (Belarusian: родны, BGN/PCGN: rodny)
- Dative (Belarusian: давальны, BGN/PCGN: daval'ny)
- Accusative (Belarusian: вінавальны, BGN/PCGN: vinaval'ny)
- Instrumental (Belarusian: творны, BGN/PCGN: tvorny)
- Locative (Belarusian: месны, BGN/PCGN: myesny)

Historically, there also existed a vocative case (Belarusian: клічны, BGN/PCGN: klichny), but it is used only sparingly in modern Belarusian, like Slovene, Slovak and the closely related Russian, generally in literature, and usually is not mentioned in textbooks.

For nouns (Belarusian: назоўнікі, BGN/PCGN: nazowniki) there are several types of declension:

- i-stem – feminine (feminine nouns ending in a hard consonant, soft consonant or ў: печ "stove", косць "bone", кроў "blood")

Case	печ SG	пе́чы PL	косць SG	ко́сці PL	кроў SG
Nominative	печ	пе́чы	косць	ко́сці	кроў
Genitive	пе́чы	пячэ́й	ко́сці	касце́й	крыві́
Dative	пе́чы	пе́чам	ко́сці	касця́м	крыві́
Accusative	печ	пе́чы	косць	ко́сці	кроў
Instrumental	пе́ччу	пе́чамі	ко́сцю	касця́мі	крывёй
Locative	пе́чы	пе́чах	ко́сці	касця́х	крыві́

- a-stem – mostly feminine (subdivided into four subgroups: hard stems, guttural stems, soft stems, hardened stems)
- o-stem – masculine (subdivided into hard stem and soft stem) and neuter (вясло "oar", мора "sea")
- consonantal stem – mostly neuter (ягня "lamb", бярэмя "burden", семя "seed")
- irregular nouns (for example, вока "eye" and вуха "ear")

=== Pronouns ===
There are eight types of pronouns (Belarusian: займеннікі, BGN/PCGN: zaymyenniki) in Belarusian:

- Personal (асабовыя):

	Singular					Plural			Reflexive (зваротны)
	1st	2nd	3rd			1st	2nd	3rd	Reflexive (зваротны)
	1st	2nd	Masc.	Fem.	Neut.	1st	2nd	3rd	Reflexive (зваротны)
(English)	I	you	he	she	it	we	you	they	___self
Nominative	я	ты	ён	яна́	яно́	мы	вы	яны́	
Genitive	мяне́	цябе́	яго́	яе́	яго́	нас	вас	іх	сябе́
Dative	мне	табе́	яму́	ёй	яму́	нам	вам	ім	сабе́
Accusative	мяне́	цябе́	яго́	яе́	яго́	нас	вас	іх	сябе́
Instrumental	мной (мно́ю)	табо́й (табо́ю)	ім	ёю	ім	на́мі	ва́мі	і́мі	сабо́й (сабо́ю)
Prepositional	аба мне	аб табе́	аб ім	аб ёй	аб ім	аб наc	аб вас	аб іх	аб сабе́

- Interrogative-comparative (пытальныя):

хто ('who') and што ('what')
	хто	што
Nominative	хто	што
Genitive	каго́	чаго́
Dative	каму́	чаму́
Accusative	каго́	што
Instrumental	кім	чым
Prepositional	аб кім	аб чым

які (which), каторы (which), чый (whose), колькі (how much)

- Demonstrative (указальныя):

гэты ('this') and той ('that')
	Masc.	Neut.	Fem.	Plur.	Masc.	Neut.	Fem.	Plur.
Nominative	гэ́ты	гэ́та	гэ́тая	гэ́тыя	той	то́е	та́я	ты́я
Genitive	гэ́тага	гэ́тага	гэ́тай (гэ́тае)	гэ́тых	тага́	таго́	той	тых
Dative	гэ́таму	гэ́таму	гэ́тай	гэ́тым	таму́	таму́	той	тым
Accusative	N or G	гэ́та	гэ́тую	N or G	N or G	то́е	ту́ю	N or G
Instrumental	гэ́тым	гэ́тым	гэ́тай	гэ́тымі	тым	тым	тою	ты́мі
Prepositional	аб гэ́тым	аб гэ́тым	аб гэ́тай	аб гэ́тых	аб тым	аб тым	аб той	аб тых

той (that); такі, гэтакі (such, of this kind); столькі, гэтулькі (that much)

- Possessive (прыналежныя):

мой (my, mine) твой (your, yours) for a singular possessor свой (my, mine, your, yours, one's, his, her, its, our, ours, your, yours, their) for a subject possessor
	Masc.	Neut.	Fem.	Plur.	Masc.	Neut.	Fem.	Plur.	Masc.	Neut.	Fem.	Plur.
Nominative	мой	маё	мая́	мае́	твой	тваё	твая́	твае́	свой	сваё	свая́	свае́
Genitive	майго́	майго́	маёй	маі́х	твайго́	твайго́	тваёй	тваі́х	свайго́	свайго́	сваёй	сваі́х
Dative	майму́	майму́	маёй	маі́м	твайму́	твайму́	тваёй	тваі́м	свайму́	свайму́	сваёй	сваі́м
Accusative	N or G	маё	маю́	N or G	N or G	тваё	тваю́	N or G	N or G	сваё	сваю́	N or G
Instrumental	маі́м	маі́м	маёй	маі́мі	тваі́м	тваі́м	тваёй	тваі́мі	сваі́м	сваі́м	сваёй	сваі́мі
Prepositional	аб маі́м	аб маі́м	аб маёй	аб маі́х	аб тваі́м	аб тваім	аб тваёй	аб тваі́х	аб сваі́м	аб сваі́м	аб сваёй	аб сваі́х

наш (our, ours) ваш (your, yours) for a plural possessor
	Masc.	Neut.	Fem.	Plur.	Masc.	Neut.	Fem.	Plur.
Nominative	наш	на́ша	на́ша	на́шы	ваш	ва́ша	ва́ша	ва́шы
Genitive	на́шага	на́шага	на́шай (на́шае)	на́шых	ва́шага	ва́шага	ва́шай (ва́шае)	ва́шых
Dative	на́шаму	на́шаму	на́шай	на́шым	ва́шаму	ва́шаму	ва́шай	ва́шым
Accusative	N or G	на́ша	на́шу	N or G	N or G	ва́ше	ва́шу	N or G
Instrumental	на́шым	на́шым	на́шай	на́шымі	ва́шым	ва́шым	ва́шай	ва́шымі
Prepositional	аб на́шым	аб на́шым	аб на́шай	аб на́шых	аб ва́шым	аб ва́шым	аб ва́шай	аб ва́шых

ягоны/яго (his) ейны/яе (her, hers) іхны/іх (their, theirs)
	Masc.	Neut.	Fem.	Plur.	Masc.	Neut.	Fem.	Plur.	Masc.	Neut.	Fem.	Plur.
Nominative	яго́ны	яго́нае	яго́ная	яго́ныя	е́йны	е́йнае	е́йная	е́йныя	і́хні	і́хняе	і́хняя	і́хнія
Genitive	яго́нага	яго́нага	яго́най (яго́нае)	яго́ных	е́йнага	е́йнага	е́йнай (е́йнае)	е́йных	і́хняга	і́хняга	і́хняй (і́хняе)	і́хніх
Dative	яго́наму	яго́наму	яго́най	яго́ным	е́йнаму	е́йнаму	е́йнай	е́йны́м	і́хняму	і́хняму	і́хняй	і́хнім
Accusative	N or G	яго́нае	яго́ную	N or G	N or G	е́йнае	е́йную	N or G	N or G	і́хняе	і́хнюю	N or G
Instrumental	яго́ным	яго́ным	яго́най	яго́нымі	е́йным	е́йны́м	е́йнай	е́йнымі	і́хнім	і́хнім	і́хняй	і́хнімі
Prepositional	аб яго́ным	аб яго́ным	аб яго́най	аб яго́ных	аб е́йным	аб е́йным	аб е́йнай	аб е́йных	аб і́хнім	аб і́хнім	аб і́хняй	аб і́хніх

- Negative (адмоўныя): ніхто (nobody), нішто (nothing), нічый (nobody's), ніякі (not of any kind), ніводзін, ніводны (no one);
- Definitive (азначальныя): сам (-self); самы (the very, – self); увесь (all, whole); усё (all, everything); усе (all, every, everybody); усякі, усялякі (every, any); кожны (each); іншы (other).
- Indefinite (няпэўныя): нехта, хтосьці (someone, somebody); нешта, штосьці (something); нечы, чыйсьці (someone's, somebody's, a); некаторы (some of); некалькі (a few, some, several); нейкі, якісьці (some, a kind of, something like); хто-небудзь, хто-колечы (anybody); што-небудзь, што-колечы (anything); чый-небудзь (anybody's); абы-што (smth. dickey); абы-чый (a, somebody's (negative)); абы-які (dickey).
- Interrogative-comparative (пытальныя): хто (who), што (what), які (which), каторы (which), чый (whose), колькі (how much);

Note: proper names and places' names are rendered in BGN/PCGN

== Sources ==
- Білоруське мовне та граматичне явище: Мовознавство. — Т. Клименко, О. Ткаченко, В. Марченко, М. Хоменко та ін. — Суми, 2004.
- Білоруська граматика. У 2-х ч. / АН БРСР, Ін-т мовознавства імені Я. Коласа; [Ред. М. В. Бірило, П. П. Шуба]. — Мн.: Наука і техніка, 1985.
- Сучасна білоруська мова: Вступ. Фонетика. Фонологія. Абетка. Графіка. Правопис. Лексикологія. Лексикографія. Фразеологія. Фразеографія: Навч. помічник / Я. М. Комаровський, В. П. Красній, У. М. Лазовський та ін. — 2-е вид., перероб. і дод. — Мн.: Вища школа, 1995. — 334 с. ISBN 978-985-06-0075-2
