= Romanization of Belarusian =

Transliteration of Belarusian from Cyrillic to Latin script

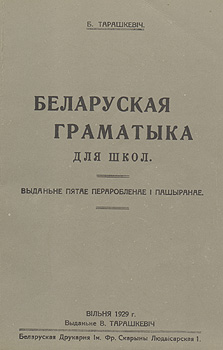
Cover of the fifth edition of Branisłaŭ Taraškievič's Belarusian Orthography for Schools (1929).

Romanization or Latinization of Belarusian is any system for transliterating written Belarusian from Cyrillic to the Latin alphabet.

== Standard systems for romanizing Belarusian ==
Standard systems for romanizing Belarusian include:

- BGN/PCGN romanization of Belarusian, 1979 (United States Board on Geographic Names and Permanent Committee on Geographical Names for British Official Use), which is the US and Great Britain prevailing system for romanising of geographical information
- British Standard 2979 : 1958
- Scientific transliteration, or the International Scholarly System for linguistics
- ALA-LC romanization, 1997 (American Library Association and Library of Congress)
- ISO 9:1995, which is also Belarusian state standard GOST 7.79–2000 for non-geographical information
- Instruction on transliteration of Belarusian geographical names with letters of Latin script, which was an official standard for geographical names, adopted by the Committee on Land Resources, Geodesy and Cartography of Belarus (2000), and recommended for use by the Working Group on Romanization Systems of the United Nations Group of Experts on Geographical Names (UNGEGN). It was significantly revised in 2007, then replaced with a new system in 2023.

Comparative table of some standard romanisations of the Belarusian letters
Cyrillic	Scholarly	ALA-LC	British	BGN/PCGN	ISO 9	National 2000	National 2007	National 2023
А а	a	a	a	a	a	a	a	a
Б б	b	b	b	b	b	b	b	b
В в	v	v	v	v	v	v	v	v
Г г	h	h	h	h	g	h	h	g
Ґ ґ	g	g	g	g	g̀			
Д д	d	d	d	d	d	d	d	d
Е е	e	e	e	ye	e	je, ie	je, ie	je, ie
Ё ё	ë	i͡o	ë	yo	ë	jo, io	jo, io	jo, io
Ж ж	ž	z͡h	zh	zh	ž	ž	ž	zh
З з	z	z	z	z	z	z	z	z
І і	i	i	i	i	ì	i	i	i
Й й	j	ĭ	ĭ	y	j	j	j	j
К к	k	k	k	k	k	k	k	k
Л л	l	l	l	l	l	l	l	l
М м	m	m	m	m	m	m	m	m
Н н	n	n	n	n	n	n	n	n
О о	o	o	o	o	o	o	o	o
П п	p	p	p	p	p	p	p	p
Р р	r	r	r	r	r	r	r	r
С с	s	s	s	s	s	s	s	s
Т т	t	t	t	t	t	t	t	t
Тс тс			t-s	t·s				
У у	u	u	u	u	u	u	u	u
Ў ў	ŭ (w)	ŭ	w	w	ǔ	ú	ŭ	w
Ф ф	f	f	f	f	f	f	f	f
Х х	x (ch)	kh	kh	kh	h	ch	ch	h
Ц ц	c	ts	ts	ts	c	c	c	c
Ч ч	č	ch	ch	ch	č	č	č	ch
Ш ш	š	sh	sh	sh	š	š	š	sh
ʼ	-	-	ˮ, "	ʺ	ʼ	-	-	-
Ы ы	y	y	ȳ	y	y	y	y	y
Ь ь	ʹ	ʹ	ʼ, '	ʹ	ʹ	ʹ	combining acute	-
Э э	è	ė	é	e	è	e	e	e
Ю ю	ju	i͡u	yu	yu	û	ju, iu	ju, iu	ju, iu
Я я	ja	i͡a	ya	ya	â	ja, ia	ja, ia	ja, ia
Historical letters
И и		ī						
Щ щ		shch						
Ъ ъ		ʺ	ˮ, "					
Ѣ ѣ		ě	ê					

== Examples ==
Transliteration of some common words
Cyrillic	Беларусь	Лукашэнка	Магілёў	сям’я
Łacinka	Biełaruś	Łukašenka	Mahiloŭ	siamja
BGN/PCGN	Byelarus′	Lukashenka	Mahilyow	syamʹʹya
Scholarly	Belarus′	Lukašènka	Mahilëŭ	sjamja
ALA-LC	Belarusʹ	Lukashėnka	Mahili͡oŭ	si͡ami͡a
British	Belarus’	Lukashénka	Mahilëw	syam”ya
ISO 9	Belarus′	Lukašènka	Magìlëǔ	sâm’â
National 2000	Bielarus’	Lukašenka	Mahilioú	siamja
National 2007	Bielaruś	Lukašenka	Mahilioŭ	siamja
National 2023	Bielarus	Lukashenka	Magiliow	siamja

== See also ==
- Belarusian alphabet
- Belarusian Latin alphabet (Łacinka / лацінка)
- Scientific transliteration of Cyrillic
- Cyrillic alphabets
- Wikipedia:Naming conventions (Cyrillic)#Belarusian (WP:BELARUSIANNAMES)
- Wikipedia:Romanization of Belarusian (essay; WP:BLR)
