= Jan Stankievič =

Belarusian politician and linguist

- Ян Станкевіч
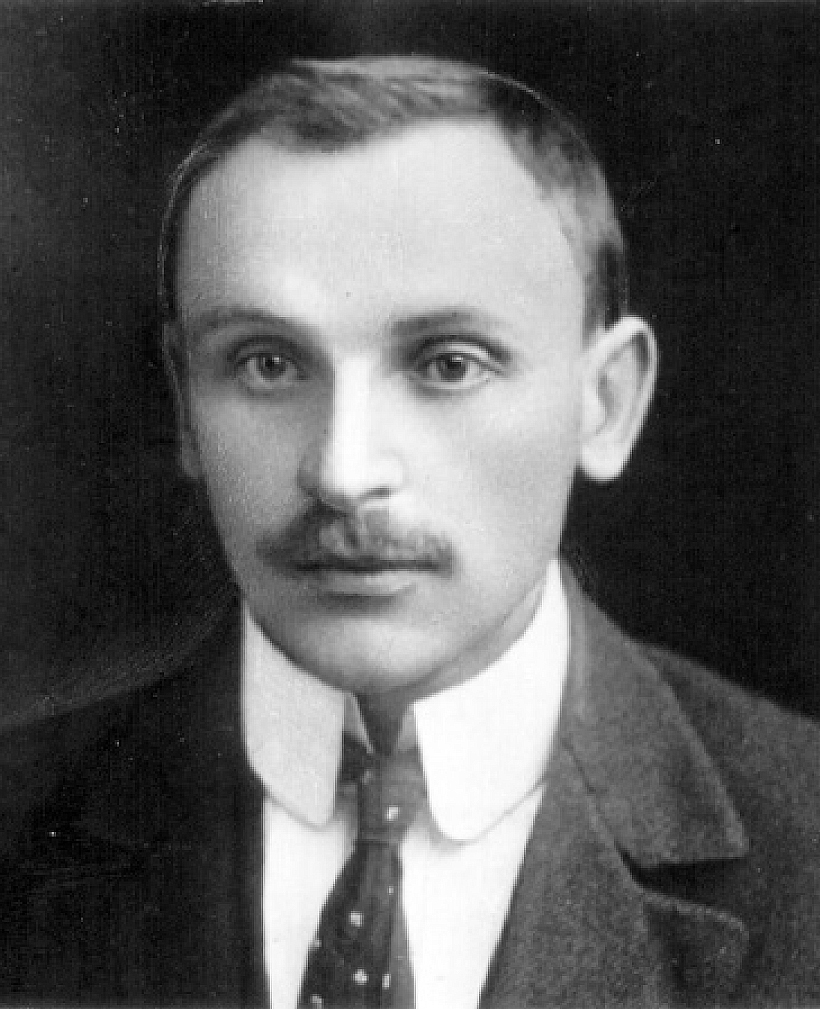
- Born: 26 November 1891; Ashmyany, Vilna Governorate, Russian Empire (present-day Belarus)
- Died: 16 July 1976 (aged 84); Hawthorne, New Jersey, U.S.
- Occupations: Politician, linguist, and historian

Jan Stankievič (Note: Belarusian: Ян Станкевіч, romanized: Yan Stankyevich, polonized: Jan Stankievič, anglicized: Ian Stankevich and John Stankevich; Polish: Jan Stankiewicz) (26 November 1891 – 16 July 1976, known by the diminutive Janka) (Note: Belarusian: Янка, romanized: Yanka, polonized: Janka) was a Belarusian politician, linguist, and historian.

== Biography ==
Jan Stankievič was born in the village Arlianiaty near Ashmyany. During World War I, Stankievič was drafted into the army of the Russian Empire. Starting in 1917–1918, he began to actively participate in activities of Belarusian national organizations.

Jan Stankievič graduated from the Vilnia Belarusian Gymnasium in 1921 and the Charles University in Prague in 1926, and became a Doctor of Slavonic Philology and History. At this time he also married Czech-born Mary Novak in Vilnius at a ceremony officiated by his Arlianiaty cousin, the Roman Catholic priest, Adam Stankievič. Between 1928 and 1932 he worked as a Belarusian language professor at the University of Warsaw, and from 1927 to 1938 at the University of Vilnius.

Between 1928 and 1930, Stankievič was a member of the Sialanskaja (Farmers') party in the Polish Sejm, representing the majority-Belarusian Lida district. As a politician, Stankievič advocated for the reintroduction of the Belarusian language in local education. In 1930 the Sejm was disbanded by General Józef Piłsudski, and Jan continued teaching Belarusian at Warsaw University.

He later rejoined his growing family in Vilnius and continued teaching while also publishing a number of books and other publications on the Belarusian language. In 1938 he was dismissed from his position at Vilnia University by the Polish authorities due to his Belarusian activism. To support his family, he then acquired and ran a bookstore in Vilnia until the Soviet occupation of the city in late September 1939.

To escape the advancing Soviet troops, who he had reason to believe would arrest him due to his Belarusian political activities, Jan crossed the nearby border to Lithuania until the events of 1940. The city of Vilnius returned to Lithuania shortly before the country was occupied by the Soviet Union, Jan Stankievič then left for East Prussia and made his way to German-occupied Warsaw which was becoming a magnet for a variety of refugees from other Soviet-occupied lands.

While in Warsaw Jan Stankievič joined the newly formed Party of Belarusian Nationalists. Convinced of the eventual defeat of the Nazi regime, they made connections with the Polish underground and its exiled government in London to influence the post-war outcome in Eastern Europe. During this time, Jan Stankievič's wife and 3 young sons moved to Prague in the now German-occupied Protectorate of Bohemia and Moravia to rejoin her extended family.

After the Germans launched a quickly successful surprise attack on their former ally, the Soviet Union, in June 1941, many of the refugees in Warsaw from formerly Soviet-occupied areas such as Vilnius and Minsk returned home, including Jan Stankievič. In 1942, Jan moved to Minsk where he wrote Belarusian textbooks to be used in Minsk schools.

In 1943, Jan Stankievič, unwilling to include Nazi propaganda in his textbooks and therefore displeasing his Volksdeutsche supervisor, left Minsk to rejoin his family in Prague. In addition, Prague had become home to a sizable Belarusian emigre community during the war into which Jan quickly established himself. However, by 1944, news of the approaching Soviet army caused Stankievič to leave Prague for the American zone of occupation in the west where he eventually settled in Munich, Germany.

In 1945, after a visit from the Soviet NKVD looking for Jan Stankievič, Jan's wife and children left Prague the next day for American-occupied Plzeň, eventually rejoining him in Regensburg, Bavaria. In Regensburg, Jan Stankievič became the first administrator of the Belarusian section of the Regensburg Displaced Persons camp. In this role, Jan Stankievič continued to promote Belarusian language and history by also teaching the Belarusian language in the camp school, while his Vassar-educated wife, Mary, taught English.

In May 1949, Jan Stankievič and his family, along with many other Eastern European refugees travelled on returning US troop ships to the United States. where he lived for the remainder of his life. Jan Stankievič was an active member of the Belarusian diaspora in the United States. His first apartment in the Spanish Harlem section of New York City was the location of the founding meeting of the Belarusian American Association.

In the years that followed, he also established the Francis Skaryna Publishing Society to publish books and other materials relating to Belarusian culture and history until his death in July 1976. During this period, Jan Stankievič worked with the ancient Hebrew and Greek scholar Dr. M. Gitlin (who was also familiar with various Slavic languages) to complete a Belarusian translation of the Bible from original Hebrew and Greek sources. Jan Stankievič considered this translation to be the work of his lifetime.

Jan Stankievič is buried at the Belarusian Autocephalic Orthodox Cemetery in East Brunswick, New Jersey.

== Works ==
- Крыўя-Беларусь у мінуласьці
- Курс гісторыі Крывіі-Беларусі
- Этнаграфічныя й гістарычныя тэрыторыі й граніцы Беларусі
- Повесьці й апавяданьні беларускіх (крывіцкіх) летапісцаў
- Беларускія плямёны
