= BGN/PCGN romanization of Belarusian =

System for romanization of Belarusian-language texts

The BGN/PCGN romanization system for Belarusian is a method for romanization of Cyrillic Belarusian texts, that is, their transliteration into the Latin alphabet.

There are a number of systems for romanization of Belarusian, but the BGN/PCGN system is relatively intuitive for anglophones to pronounce. It is part of the larger set of BGN/PCGN romanizations, which includes methods for 29 different languages. It was developed by the United States Board on Geographic Names and by the Permanent Committee on Geographical Names for British Official Use. The portion of the system pertaining to the Belarusian language was jointly adopted by BGN and PCGN in 1979.

This romanization of Belarusian can be rendered by using only the basic letters and punctuation found on English-language keyboards: no diacritics or unusual letters are required, but the interpunct character (·) is optionally used to avoid some ambiguity.

The following table describes the system and provides examples.

Belarusian letter	Romanization	Special provision	Examples
А (а)	A (a)	None	Антон = Anton; Вілейка = Vilyeyka
Б (б)	B (b)	None	Брэст = Brest; Дубна = Dubna
В (в)	V (v)	None	Віцебск = Vitsyebsk; Асіповічы = Asipovichy
Г (г)	H (h)	None	Гродна = Hrodna; Брагін = Brahin
Д (д)	D (d)	None	Добруш = Dobrush; Ліда = Lida
Е (е)	Ye (ye)	None	Гомель = Homyel’ Беліца = Byelitsa
Ё (ё)	Yo (yo)	None	Ёдкавічы = Yodkavichy; Нёман = Nyoman
Ж (ж)	Zh (zh)	None	Жлобін = Zhlobin; Ружаны = Ruzhany
З (з)	Z (z)	None	Зоя = Zoya князь = knyaz’
І (і)	I (i)	None	Ігнат = Ihnat; Мінск = Minsk
Й (й)	Y (y)	Belarusian names do not normally begin with this letter. This may happen in Belarusian renderings of foreign names, though.	Йосель = Yosyel’ Койданава = Koydanava
К (к)	K (k)	None	Крапіўна = Krapiwna; Менск = Myensk
Л (л)	L (l)	None	Лаўна = Lawna; Лёсік = Lyosik; Купала = Kupala; Вілейка = Vilyeyka; Міхал = Mikhal; Вільня = Vil’nya; Лепель = Lyepyel’
М (м)	M (m)	None	Магілёў = Mahilyow; Няміга = Nyamiha
Н (н)	N (n)	None	Наваградак = Navahradak; Баранавічы = Baranavichy
О (о)	O (o)	None	Орша = Orsha; Востраў = Vostraw
П (п)	P (p)	None	Пінск = Pinsk; Дняпро = Dnyapro
Р (р)	R (r)	None	Рагачоў = Rahachow; Сураж = Surazh
С (с)	S (s)	None	Смаляны = Smalyany; Арэса = Aresa; Рось = Ros’
Т (т)	T (t)	None	Талочын = Talochyn; Масты = Masty
У (у)	U (u)	None	Уладзімір = Uladzimir; Бабруйск = Babruysk
Ў (ў)	W (w)	None	Быхаў = Bykhaw; Воўпа = Vowpa; Іўе = Iwye
Ф (ф)	F (f)	None	Фолюш = Folyush фортка = fortka
Х (х)	Kh (kh)	None	Хатынь = Khatyn’ Быхаў = Bykhaw
Ц (ц)	Ts (ts)	None	Ганцавічы = Hantsavichy; Стоўбцы = Stowbtsy цьмяны = ts’myany мясцовы = myastsovy Астравец = Astravyets; Прыпяць = Prypyats’
Ч (ч)	Ch (ch)	None	Чэрыкаў = Cherykaw; Шчара = Shchara; Нарач = Narach
Ш (ш)	Sh (sh)	None	Шклоў = Shklow; Ашмяны = Ashmyany
Ы (ы)	Y (y)	Belarusian names do not normally begin with this letter. It may happen in Belarusian renderings of foreign names.	Ыттык-Кёль = Yttyk-Kyol’ Кобрын = Kobryn; Солы = Soly
Ь (ь)	’	This character does not occur in the beginning of a word.	Копысь = Kopys’ рунь = run’
Э (э)	E (e)	None	Эйсманты = Eysmanty; Крэва = Kreva
Ю (ю)	Yu (yu)	None	Юры = Yury уюн = uyun
Я (я)	Ya (ya)	None	Язэп = Yazep; Івянец = Ivyanyets
’	’’	This symbol denotes the absence of palatalization and is not a part of the standard alphabet.	з’езд = z’’yezd
Зг (зг)	Z∙h (z∙h)	The use of this digraph is optional.	
Кг (кг)	K∙h (k∙h)	The use of this digraph is optional.	
Сг (сг)	S∙h (s∙h)	The use of this digraph is optional.	
Тс (тс)	T∙s (t∙s)	The use of this digraph is optional.	
Цг (цг)	ts∙h (ts∙h)	The use of this digraph is optional.	
Ґ (ґ)	G (g)	This character is obsolete.	

== See also ==
- Belarusian language
- Belarusian Latin alphabet
- Romanization of Belarusian
- List of cities in Belarus
