= Instruction on transliteration of Belarusian geographical names with letters of Latin script =

System for romanization of Belarusian-language texts

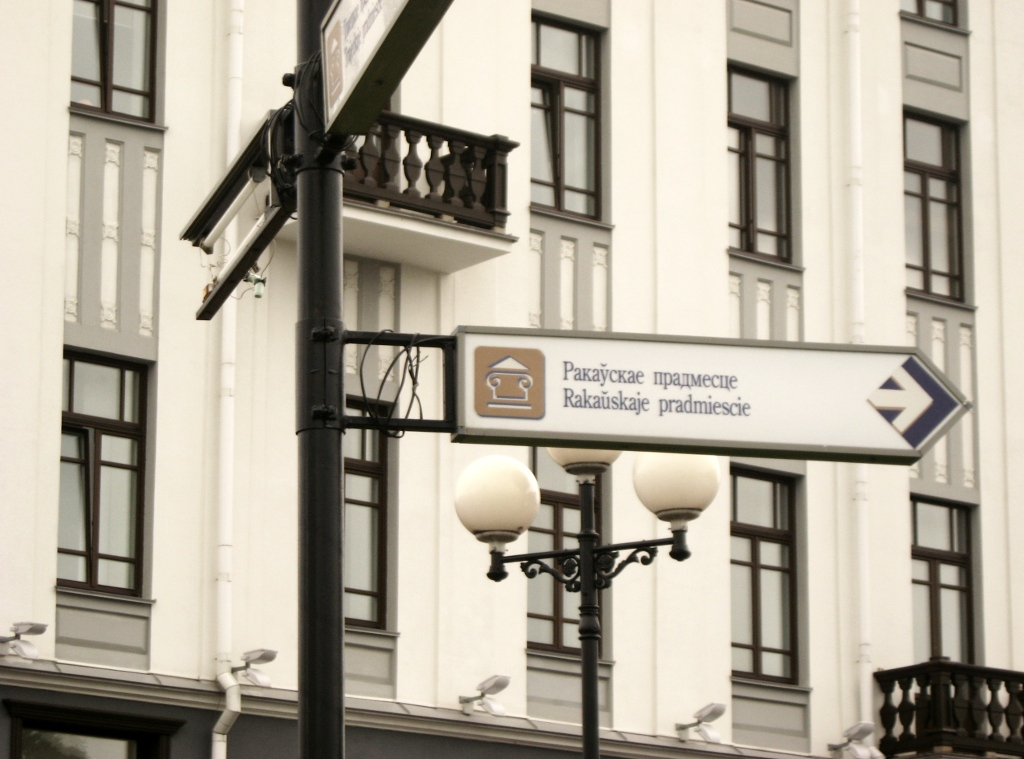
Signpost in Minsk done according to the Instruction on Transliteration

The Instruction on the Transliteration of Belarusian Geographical Names with Letters of the Latin Script was an official standard of the romanization of Belarusian geographical names.

== Status ==
The instruction was adopted by a decree of the Belarusian State Committee on Land Resources, Geodetics and Cartography (2000-11-23). The official name of the document is, in Russian: «Инструкция по транслитерации географических названий Республики Беларусь буквами латинского алфавита». It was published in the National Registry of Legal Acts of the Republic of Belarus (issue №3, 2001-01-11).

It was reported in the press that since October 2006 this instruction had been recommended for use by the Working Group on Romanization Systems of the United Nations Group of Experts on Geographical Names (UNGEGN). The final decision of the UN was planned for a 2007 conference.

The system was modified again on 11 June 2007, mainly in order to conform with the recommendations of the UN WGRS, which advise avoiding the use of digraphs if possible, and adopted by the UN in version 3.0 of their romanization report, 17 March 2008. This transliteration standard was based on the traditional Belarusian Latin alphabet (Łacinka).

In February 2013, the system was recommended for adoption as the international system for the romanization of Belarusian geographical names.

The instruction replaced the previous equivalent regulations and set up the rules for rendering Belarusian geographical names, which were mandatory within the territory of the Republic of Belarus when producing cartographic and other goods intended for international use.

A new romanization system was adopted in 2023 for both Belarusian and Russian within the country, effectively abandoning the use of Łacinka-based transliteration.

== Romanization guidelines (2007) ==
Three diacritical signs were used:

- caron ( ˇ ), U+030C, combined only with Cc, Ss, Zz.
- acute accent ( ´ ), U+0301, combined only with Cc, Ll, Nn, Ss, Zz.
- breve ( ˘ ), U+0306, combined only with Uu.

Table describing Instruction on transliteration (2007) with examples
Cyrillic	Romanization	Special provision	Examples
А а	A а	-	Аршанскi - Aršanski
Б б	B b	-	Бешанковiчы - Biešankovičy
В в	V v	-	Вiцебск - Viciebsk
Г г	H h	-	Гомель - Homieĺ, Гаўя - Наŭjа
Д д	D d	-	Добруш - Dobruš
Е е	Je je	At the beginning of the word, after vowels or the apostrophe or the separating soft sign or Ўў/Ŭŭ.	Ельск - Jеĺsk, Бабаедава - Babajedava
Е е	iе	After the consonants.	Лепель - Liepieĺ
Ё ё	Jo jo	At the beginning of the word, after vowels or the apostrophe or the separating soft sign or Ўў/Ŭŭ.	Ёды - Jody, Вераб’ёвiчы - Vierabjovičy
Ё ё	io	After the consonants.	Мёры - Miory
Ж ж	Ž ž	-	Жодзiшкi - Žodziški
З з	Z z	-	Зэльва - Zeĺva
І і	I i	-	Iванава - Ivanava, Iўе - Iŭje
Й й	J j	-	Лагойск - Lahojsk
К к	K k	-	Круглае - Kruhlaje
Л л	L l	-	Любань - Liubań
М м	M m	-	Магiлёў - Mahilioŭ
Н н	N n	-	Нясвiж - Niasviž
О о	O o	-	Орша - Orša
П п	P p	-	Паставы - Pastavy
Р р	R r	-	Рагачоў - Rahačoŭ
С с	S s	-	Светлагорск - Svietlahorsk
Т т	T t	-	Талачын - Talačyn
У у	U u	-	Узда - Uzda
Ў ў	Ŭ ŭ	-	Шаркаўшчына - Šarkaŭščyna
Ф ф	F f	-	Фанiпаль - Fanipaĺ
Х х	Ch ch	-	Хоцiмск - Chocimsk
Ц ц	C c	-	Цёмны Лес - Ciоmny Lies
Ч ч	Č č	-	Чавусы - Čavusy
Ш ш	Š š	-	Шумiлiна - Šumilina
’(apostrophe)	-	Not transliterated.	Раз’езд - Razjezd
Ы ы	Y y	-	Чыгiрынка - Čyhirynka
Ь ь	´ (acute accent)	Combining acute.	дзь = dź, зь = ź, ль = ĺ, нь = ń, сь = ś, ць = ć. Example: Чэрвень - Červień
Э э	E e	-	Чачэрск - Čačersk
Ю ю	Ju ju	At the beginning of the word, after vowels or the apostrophe or the separating soft sign or Ўў/Ŭŭ.	Юхнаўка - Juchnaŭka, Гаюцiна - Hajucina
Ю ю	iu	After the consonants.	Любонiчы - Liuboničy
Я я	Ja ja	At the beginning of the word, after vowels or the apostrophe or the separating soft sign or Ўў/Ŭŭ.	Ямнае - Jamnaje, Баяры - Bajary
Я я	iа	After the consonants.	Вязынка - Viazynka, Bаляр’яны - Valiarjany

Note: The initial 2000 version differed from the above: ў = ú, ь = ’ (apostrophe; e.g., дзь = dz’, зь = z’, ль = l’, нь = n’, сь = s’, ць = c’).

== See also ==
- Romanization of Belarusian
- Belarusian Latin alphabet
- DSTU 9112:2021 – State Standard of Ukraine for the transliteration of Cyrillic texts to Latin and vice versa
