= Belarusian language =

East Slavic language

Belarusian
- беларуская мова
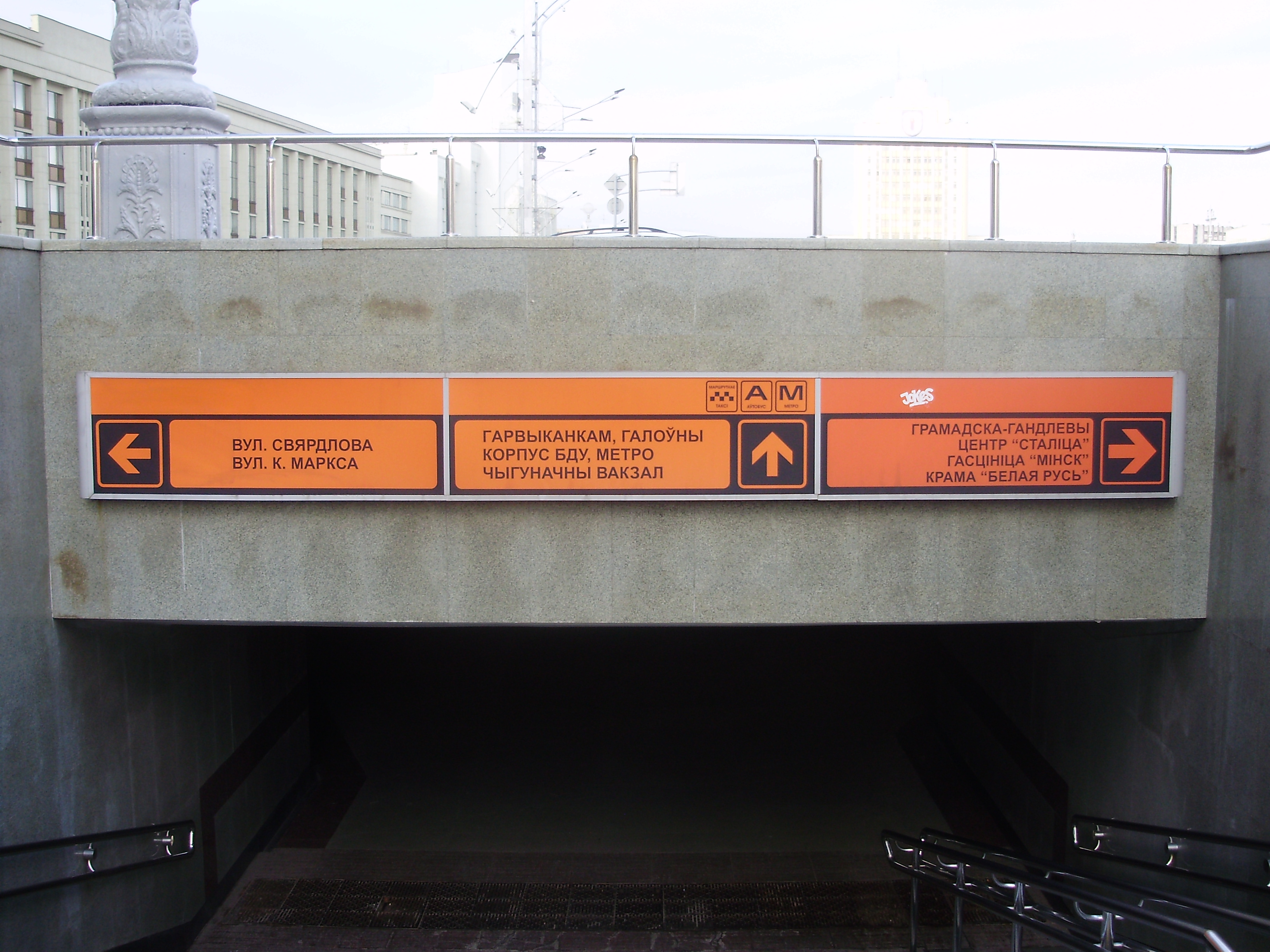
- Monolingually Belarusian sign by the Minsk metro.
- Pronunciation: [bʲe̞ɫɐˈruskɐjɐ ˈmo̞vɐ]
- Native to: Belarus
- Ethnicity: Belarusians
- Native speakers: 5.094 million (2019 census); 1.3 million L2 speakers (2009 census)
- Language family: Indo-European: Balto-Slavic; Slavic; East Slavic; Ruthenian; Belarusian
- Early forms: Proto-Indo-European: Proto-Balto-Slavic; Proto-Slavic; Old East Slavic; Ruthenian (Old Belarusian)
- Writing system: Cyrillic script (Belarusian alphabet); Latin script (Belarusian Latin alphabet); Braille (Belarusian Braille); Perso-Arabic script (Belarusian Arabic alphabet)

Official status
- Official language in: Belarus; 5 bilingual municipalities in Poland
- Recognised minority language in: Poland; Czech Republic; Ukraine
- Regulated by: National Academy of Sciences of Belarus

Language codes
- ISO 639-1: be
- ISO 639-2: bel
- ISO 639-3: bel
- Glottolog: bela1254
- Linguasphere: 53-AAA-eb < 53-AAA-e (varieties: 53-AAA-eba to 53-AAA-ebg) language of minority
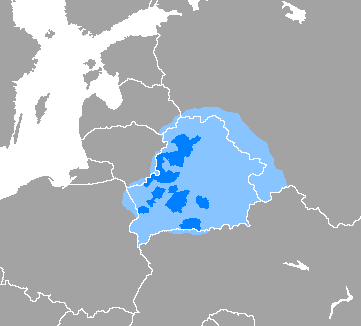
- Belarusian-speaking world Legend: Dark blue – territory where Belarusian is the primary language; Light blue – territory where Belarusian is a minority language

- Belarusian is classified as Vulnerable by the UNESCO Atlas of the World's Languages in Danger (2023).

Belarusian (Note: endonym: беларуская мова, romanized: biełaruskaja mova, pronounced [bʲɛɫaˈruskaja ˈmɔva]) is an East Slavic language. It is one of the two official languages in Belarus, the other being Russian. It is also spoken in parts of Russia, Lithuania, Latvia, Poland (where it is the official language in 5 bilingual municipalities), Ukraine, and the United States by the Belarusian diaspora.

Before Belarus gained independence in 1991, the language was known in English as Byelorussian or Belorussian, or alternatively as White Russian. (Note: While sometimes historically referred to as Byelorussian, Belorussian and White Russian, it is distinct from the Russian language itself.) Following independence, it became known as Belarusian, or alternatively as Belarusan.

As one of the East Slavic languages, Belarusian shares many grammatical and lexical features with other members of the group. To some extent, Russian, Ukrainian, and Belarusian retain a degree of mutual intelligibility. Belarusian descends from a language generally referred to as Ruthenian (13th to 18th centuries), which had, in turn, descended from what is referred to as Old East Slavic (10th to 13th centuries).

In the first Belarusian census in 1999, the Belarusian language was declared a "language spoken at home" by about 3,686,000 Belarusian citizens (36.7% of the population). About 6,984,000 (85.6%) of Belarusians declared it their "mother tongue". Other sources, such as Ethnologue, put the figure at approximately 3.5 million active speakers in Belarus. In Russia, the Belarusian language is declared as a "familiar language" by about 316,000 inhabitants, among them about 248,000 Belarusians, comprising about 30.7% of Belarusians living in Russia. In Ukraine, the Belarusian language is declared as a "native language" by about 55,000 Belarusians, which comprise about 19.7% of Belarusians living in Ukraine. In Poland, the Belarusian language is declared as a "language spoken at home" by about 40,000 inhabitants. According to a study done by the Belarusian government in 2009, 72% of Belarusians speak Russian at home, while Belarusian is actively used by only 11.9% of Belarusians (others speak a mixture of Russian and Belarusian, known as Trasianka). Approximately 29.4% of Belarusians can write, speak, and read Belarusian, while 52.5% can only read and speak it. Nevertheless, there are no Belarusian-language universities in Belarus.

== Names ==
=== Official English-language name ===
- Belarusian (/ˌbɛləˈruːsiən/ or /ˌbɛləˈruːʒən/) – derived from the name of the country "Belarus". It may also be spelled Belarusan (/ˌbɛləˈruːsən, -zən/), a form used officially from 1992 to 1995 including in the United Nations and by diaspora.

=== Historical ===
- Byelorussian (Note: Also spelled Belorussian or Bielorussian) – derived from the Russian-language name of the country "Byelorussia" (Russian: Белоруссия, romanized: Belorussiya, lit. 'White Russia'), used officially (in the Russian language) in the times of the USSR (1922–1991) and, later, in the Russian Federation.
- White Ruthenian, or White Russian, (Note: While sometimes historically referred to as White Russian, it is distinct from the Russian language itself.) (and its equivalents in other languages) – literally, a word-by-word translation of the parts of the composite word Belarusian. The term "White Ruthenian" with reference to language has appeared in English-language texts since at least 1921. The oldest one, Latin term "Albae Russiae, Poloczk dicto" is recorded in 1381.

=== Alternative suggestions ===
- Grand-Lithuanian, or Grand Lithuanian, (Note: вялікалітоўская (мова) / vialikalitoŭskaja (mova)) – proposed and used by Jan Stankievič since the 1960s, referencing chancery language of the Grand Duchy of Lithuania, intended to part with the "diminishing tradition of having the name related to the Muscovite tradition of calling the Belarusian lands" and to pertain to the "great tradition of Belarusian statehood".
- Kryvian (Note: крывіцкая/крывічанская/крыўская (мова) / kryvickaja/kryvičanskaja/kryŭskaja (mova)) – derived from the name of the Slavonic tribe Kryvichs, one of the main tribes in the foundations of the forming of the Belarusian nation. Created and used in the 19th century by Belarusian Polish-speaking writers Jaroszewicz, Narbut, Rogalski, Jan Czeczot. Promoted by Vatslaw Lastowski.

=== Vernacular ===
- Simple, (Note: простая (мова) / prostaja (mova)) or local, (Note: тутэйшая (мова) / tutejšaja (mova)) – used mainly in times preceding the common recognition of the existence of Belarus in general.
- Simple Black Ruthenian (Note: Russian: простой чернорусский, romanized: prostoi chernorusskii) – used in the beginning of the 19th century by the Russian researcher Baranovski and attributed to contemporary vernacular Belarusian.

== Classification and relationship to other languages ==
There is a high degree of mutual intelligibility among the Belarusian, Russian, and Ukrainian languages.

Within East Slavic, the Belarusian language is most closely related to Ukrainian.

== Dialects ==
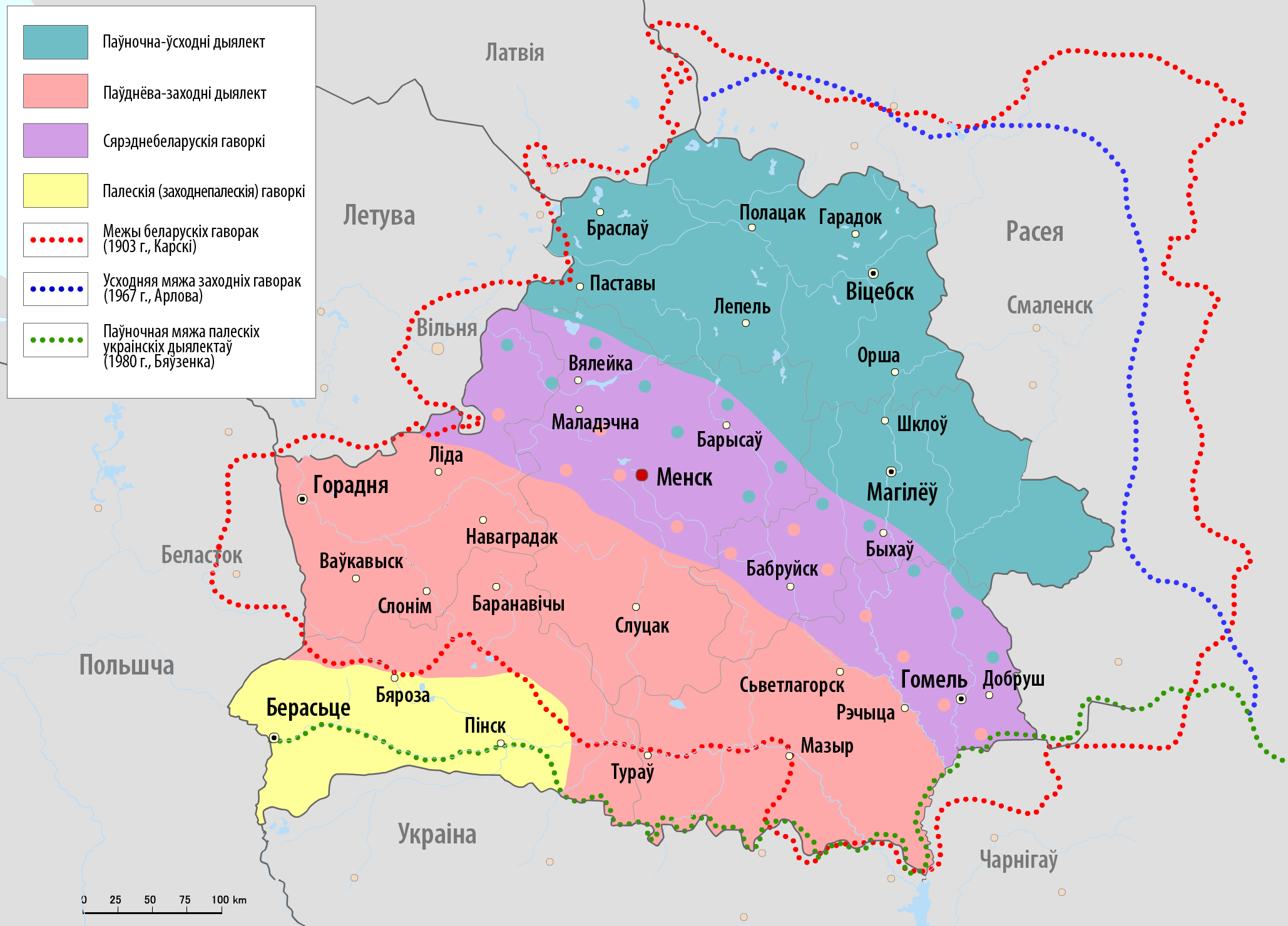
Dialects North-Eastern Middle South-Western West Polesian Lines Area of Belarusian language (1903, Karski) Eastern border of western group of Russian dialects (1967, Zaharova, Orlova) Border between Belarusian and Russian or Ukrainian (1980, Bevzenk)

Besides the standardized lect, there are two main dialects of the Belarusian language: the northeastern dialect and the southwestern dialect. In addition, there is a transitional "Middle Belarusian" dialect group and a separate "West Polesian" dialect group.

The northeastern and southwestern dialects are separated by a hypothetical line (Ashmyany–Minsk–Babruysk–Gomel) with the area of the Middle Belarusian dialect group placed on and along this line.

The northeastern dialect is characterised by the "soft sounding R" (Note: мякка-эравы / miakka-eravy) and "strong akanye"; (Note: моцнае аканне / mocnaje akannie) and the southwestern dialect is characterised by the "hard sounding R" (Note: цвёрда-эравы / cviorda-eravy) and "moderate akanye". (Note: умеранае аканне / umieranaje akannie)

The West Polesian dialect group is separated from the rest of the country by the conventional line Pruzhany–Ivatsevichy–Tsyelyakhany–Luninyets–Stolin.

== History ==
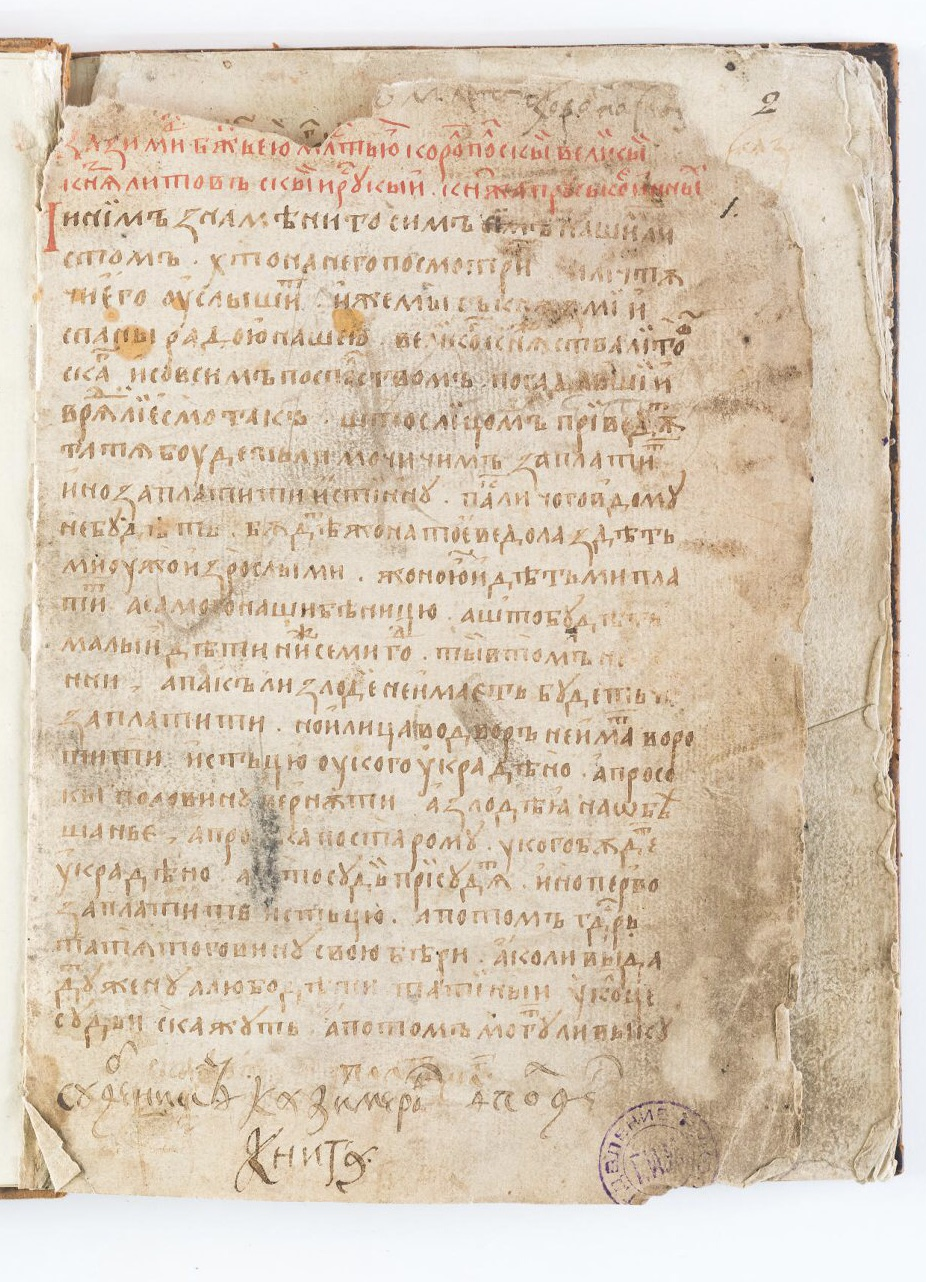
The Casimir's Code of 1468, in Ruthenian

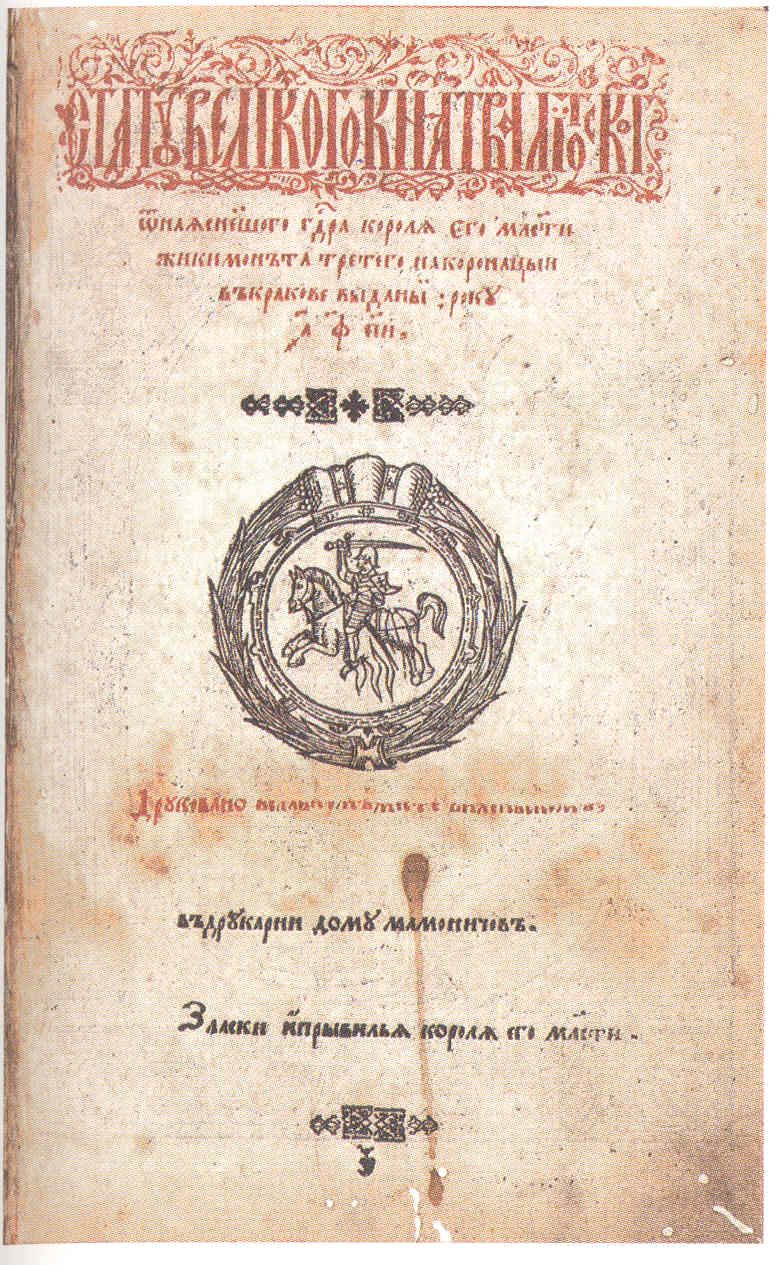
The third Lithuanian statute of 1588, all three written in Ruthenian

The modern Belarusian language was redeveloped on the base of the vernacular spoken remnants of the Ruthenian language, surviving in the ethnic Belarusian territories in the 19th century. The end of the 18th century (the times of the Divisions of Commonwealth) is the usual conventional borderline between the Ruthenian and Modern Belarusian stages of development.

By the end of the 18th century, (Old) Belarusian was still common among the minor nobility in the eastern part, in the territory of present-day Belarus, of the Grand Duchy of Lithuania (hereafter Lithuania). Jan Czeczot in the 1840s had mentioned that even his generation's grandfathers preferred speaking (Old) Belarusian. According to A. N. Pypin, the Belarusian language was spoken in some areas among the minor nobility during the 19th century. In its vernacular form, it was the language of the smaller town dwellers and of the peasantry and it had been the language of oral folklore. Teaching in Belarusian was conducted mainly in schools run by the Basilian order.

The development of Belarusian in the 19th century was strongly influenced by the political conflict in the territories of the former Lithuania, between the Russian Imperial authorities, trying to consolidate their rule over the "joined provinces", and the Polish and Polonized nobility, trying to bring back its pre-Partitions rule

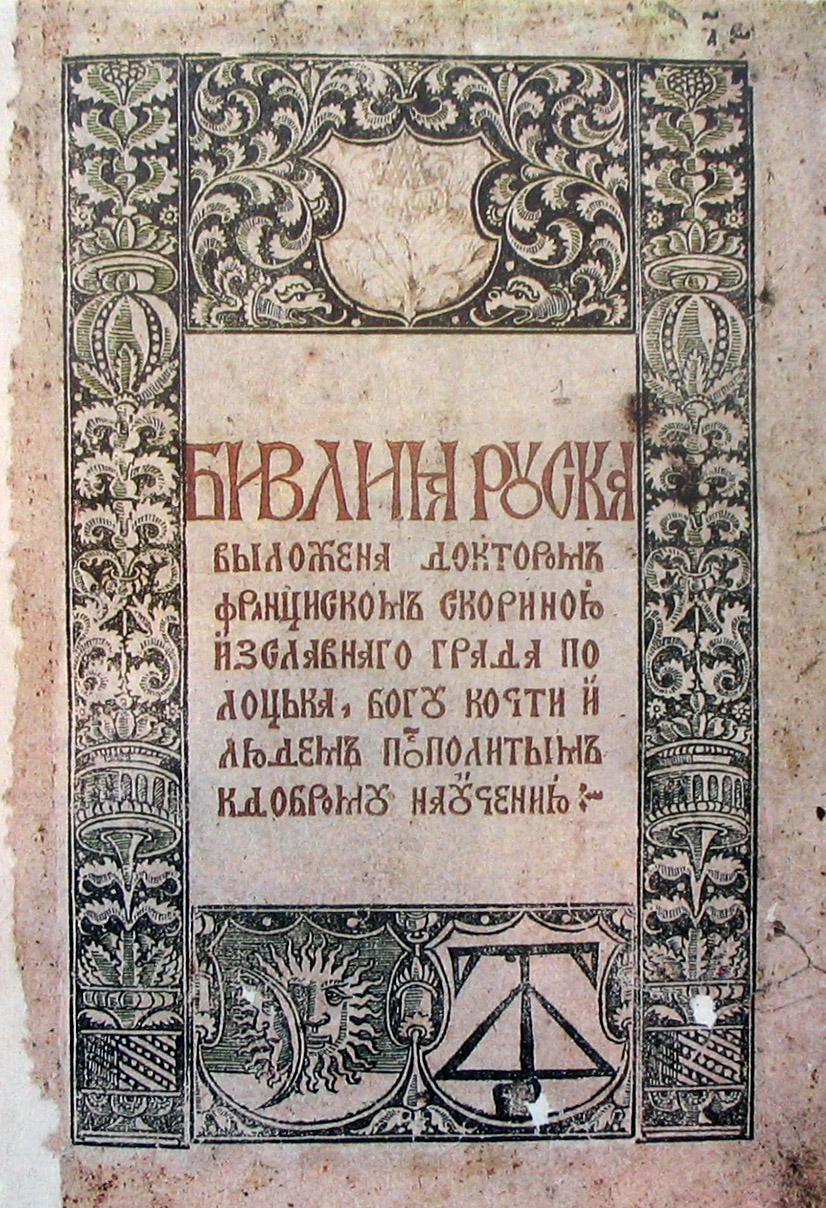
Ruthenian Bible by Francysk Skaryna, 1517, first ever book printed in Eastern Europe

One of the important manifestations of this conflict was the struggle for ideological control over the educational system. The Polish and Russian languages were being introduced and re-introduced, while the general state of the people's education remained poor until the very end of the Russian Empire.

In summary, the first two decades of the 19th century had seen the unprecedented prosperity of Polish culture and language in the former Lithuanian lands, and had prepared the era of such famous Polish writers as Adam Mickiewicz and Władysław Syrokomla. The era had seen the effective completion of the Polonization of the lowest level of the nobility, the further reduction of the area of use of contemporary Belarusian, and the effective folklorization of Belarusian culture. Nevertheless, at the beginning of the 19th century "there began a revival of national pride within the country … and a growth in interest [in Belarusian] from outside".

Due both to the state of the people's education and to the strong positions of Polish and Polonized nobility, it was only after the 1880s–1890s that the educated Belarusian element, still shunned because of "peasant origin", began to appear in state offices.

In 1846, ethnographer Pavel Shpilevskiy prepared a Belarusian grammar (using the Cyrillic alphabet) on the basis of the folk dialects of the Minsk region. However, the Russian Academy of Sciences refused to print his submission, on the basis that it had not been prepared in a sufficiently scientific manner.

From the mid-1830s ethnographic works began to appear, and tentative attempts to study the language were instigated (e.g. Shpilevskiy's grammar). The Belarusian literary tradition began to re-form, based on the folk language, initiated by the works of Vintsent Dunin-Martsinkyevich.

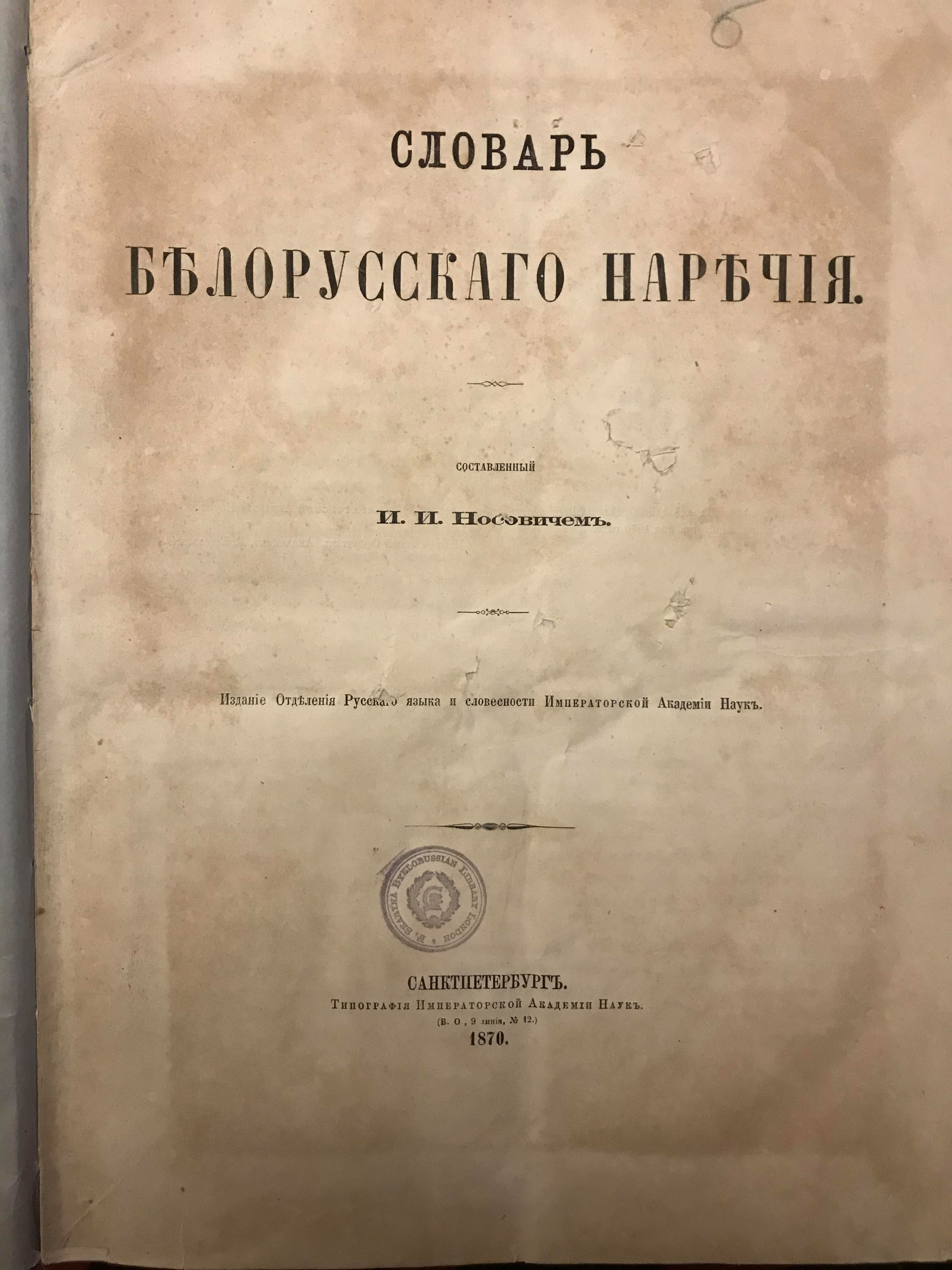
The cover of the copy of The First Belarusian Dictionary by Ivan Nasovič preserved at the Francis Skaryna Belarusian Library and Museum

At the beginning of the 1860s, both the Russian and Polish parties in Belarusian lands had begun to realise that the decisive role in the upcoming conflicts was shifting to the peasantry, overwhelmingly Belarusian. So a large amount of propaganda appeared, targeted at the peasantry and written in Belarusian; notably, the anti-Russian, anti-Tsarist, anti-Eastern Orthodox "Manifesto" and the first newspaper Mužyckaja prauda (lit. 'Peasants' Truth'; 1862–1863) by Konstanty Kalinowski, and anti-Polish, anti-Revolutionary, pro-Orthodox booklets and poems (1862).

The advent of the all-Russian narodniks and Belarusian national movements during the late 1870s and early 1880s renewed interest in the Belarusian language and literary tradition. During these times, Belarusian writer Francišak Bahuševič made his appeal to Belarusians: "Do not forsake our language, lest you pass away". (Note: Belarusian: Не пакідайце ж мовы нашай, каб не ўмёрлі, romanized: Nie pakidajcie ž movy našaj, kab nie ŭmiorli)

The First Belarusian Dictionary by Ivan Nasovič was published in 1870. In the editorial introduction to the dictionary, it is noted that:

The Belarusian local tongue, which dominates a vast area from the Nioman and the Narew to the Upper Volga and from the Western Dvina to the Prypiac and the Ipuc and which is spoken by inhabitants of the North-Western and certain adjacent provinces, or those lands that were in the past settled by the Kryvic tribe, has long attracted the attention of our philologists because of those precious remains of the ancient Ruthenian language that survived in that tongue.

Geographic distribution of Belarusian language in the Russian Empire according to the 1897 census

In 1891, in the preface to the Belarusian Flute, Francišak Bahuševič wrote, "There have been many peoples, which first lost their language... and then they perished entirely. So do not abandon our Belarusian language, lest we perish!"

According to the 1897 Russian Empire census, about 5.89 million people declared themselves speakers of Belarusian (then known as White Russian).

The end of the 19th century, however, still showed that the urban language of Belarusian towns remained either Polish or Russian. The same census showed that towns with a population greater than 50,000 had fewer than a tenth Belarusian speakers. This state of affairs greatly contributed to a perception that Belarusian was a "rural" and "uneducated" language.

However, the census was a major breakthrough for the first steps of the Belarusian national self-awareness and identity, since it clearly showed to the Imperial authorities and the still-strong Polish minority that the population and the language were neither Polish nor Russian.

Excerpt from the Russian Empire Census results
	Total population	Belarusian	Russian	Polish
Vilna	1,591,207	891,903	78,623	130,054
Vitebsk	1,489,246	987,020	198,001	50,377
Grodno	1,603,409	1,141,714	74,143	161,662
Minsk	2,147,621	1,633,091	83,999	64,617
Mogilev	1,686,764	1,389,782	58,155	17,526
Smolensk	1,525,279	100,757	1,397,875	7,314
Chernigov	2,297,854	151,465	495,963	3,302
Privislinsky Krai	9,402,253	29,347	335,337	6,755,503
Russian Empire	125,640,021	5,885,547	55,667,469	7,931,307
^{*} See also: Administrative-territorial division of Belarus and bordering lands in 2nd half 19 cent. (right half-page) and Ethnic composition of Belarus and bordering lands (prep. by Mikola Bich on the basis of 1897 data)

=== 1900s–1910s ===
The rising influence of socialist ideas (e.g., Belarusian Socialist Assembly, Alaiza Pashkevich) further advanced the emancipation of the Belarusian language. The fundamental works of Yefim Karsky marked a turning point in the scientific perception of Belarusian. The ban on publishing books and papers in Belarusian was officially removed on 25 December 1904. The unprecedented surge of national feeling in the 20th century, especially among the workers and peasants, particularly after the events of 1905, gave momentum to the intensive development of Belarusian literature and press (e.g., Nasha Niva, Yanka Kupala, Yakub Kolas).

=== 1914–1917 ===
On 22 December 1915, Paul von Hindenburg issued an order on schooling in German Army-occupied territories in the Russian Empire (Ober Ost), banning schooling in Russian and including the Belarusian language in an exclusive list of four languages made mandatory in the respective native schooling systems (Belarusian, Lithuanian, Polish, Yiddish). School attendance was not made mandatory, though. Passports at this time were bilingual, in German and in one of the "native languages". Also at this time, Belarusian preparatory schools, printing houses, press organs were opened.

=== 1917–1920 ===
In the Belarusian Democratic Republic, Belarusian was used as the only official language (decreed by Belarusian People's Secretariat on 28 April 1918). In the Byelorussian Soviet Socialist Republic (BSSR), Belarusian was decreed by the Central Executive Committee to be one of the four official languages – along with Polish, Russian, and Yiddish – in February 1921.

=== 1920–1930 ===
==== Soviet Belarus ====
A decree of 15 July 1924 confirmed that the Belarusian, Russian, Yiddish and Polish languages had equal status in Soviet Belarus.

In the BSSR, Tarashkyevich's grammar had been officially accepted for use in state schooling after its re-publication in unchanged form, first in 1922 by Yazep Lyosik under his own name as Practical grammar. Part I, then in 1923 by the Belarusian State Publishing House under the title Belarusian language. Grammar. Ed. I. 1923, also by "Ya. Lyosik".

In 1925, Lyosik added two new chapters, addressing the orthography of compound words and partly modifying the orthography of assimilated words. From this point on, Belarusian grammar had been popularized and taught in the educational system in that form. The ambiguous and insufficient development of several components of Tarashkyevich's grammar was perceived to be the cause of some problems in practical usage, and this led to discontent with the grammar.

In 1924 and 1925, Lyosik and his brother Anton prepared and published their project of orthographic reform, proposing a number of radical changes. A fully phonetic orthography was introduced. One of the most distinctive changes brought in was the principle of akanye, (Note: аканне / akannie) wherein unstressed ⟨o⟩ is written as ⟨а⟩.

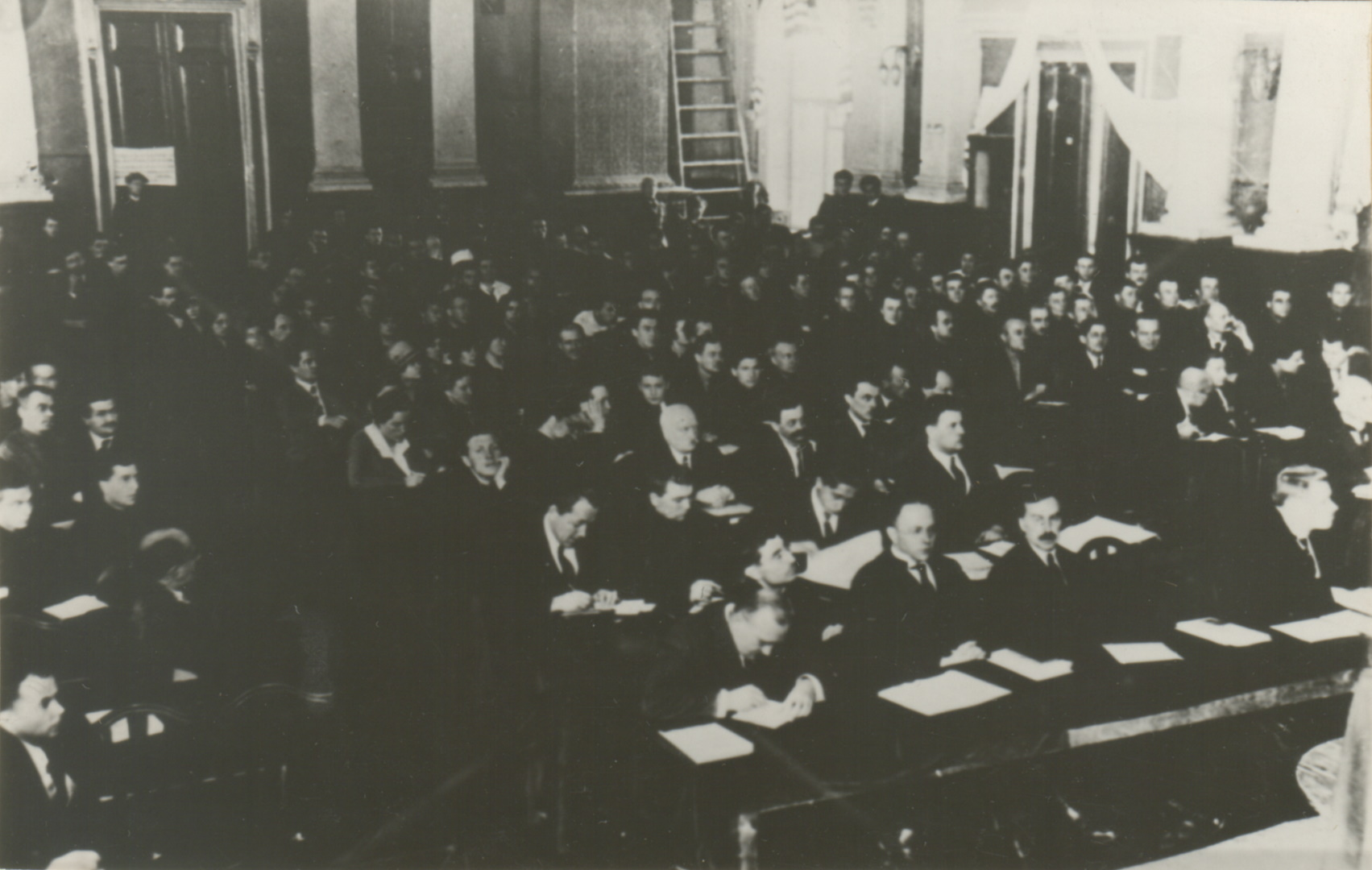
The 1926 Belarusian Academic Conference on Reform of the Orthography and Alphabet in Minsk

The Belarusian Academic Conference on Reform of the Orthography and Alphabet was convened in 1926. After discussions on the project, the Conference made resolutions on some of the problems. However, the Lyosik brothers' project had not addressed all the problematic issues, so the Conference was not able to address all of those.

As the outcome of the conference, the Orthographic Commission was created to prepare the project of the actual reform. This was instigated on 1 October 1927, headed by S. Nyekrashevich, with the following principal guidelines of its work adopted:

- To consider the resolutions of the Belarusian Academic Conference (1926) non-mandatory, although highly competent material.
- To simplify Tarashkyevich's grammar where it was ambiguous or difficult in use, to amend it where it was insufficiently developed (e.g., orthography of assimilated words), and to create new rules if absent (orthography of proper names and geographical names).

During its work between 1927 and 1929, the commission had actually prepared the project for spelling reform. The resulting project had included both completely new rules and existing rules in unchanged and changed forms, some of the changes being the work of the commission itself, and others resulting from the resolutions of the Belarusian Academic Conference (1926), re-approved by the commission.

Notably, the use of the Ь (soft sign) before the combinations "consonant+iotated vowel" ("softened consonants"), which had been previously denounced as highly redundant (e.g., in the proceedings of the Belarusian Academic Conference (1926)), was cancelled. However, the complete resolution of the highly important issue of the orthography of unstressed Е (IE) was not achieved.

Both the resolutions of the Belarusian Academic Conference (1926) and the project of the Orthographic Commission (1930) caused much disagreement in the Belarusian academic environment. Several elements of the project were to be put under appeal in the "higher (political) bodies of power".

==== West Belarus ====
In Western Belorussia, under Polish rule, the Belarusian language was at a disadvantage. Schooling in the Belarusian language was obstructed, and the printing in Belarusian experienced political oppression.

Authors who later emigrated treated homeland as inseparable from the Belarusian language.

Tarashkyevich's grammar was re-published five times in Western Belarus. However, the 5th edition (1929) was the version diverging from the previously published one, which Tarashkyevich had prepared disregarding the Belarusian Academic Conference (1926) resolutions.

=== 1930s ===
==== Soviet Belarus ====
From 1929 to 1930, Soviet authorities of Belarus made a series of drastic crackdowns against the supposed "national-democratic counter-revolution" (informally "nats-dems"). (Note: нац-дэмы / nac-demy) Effectively, entire generations of Socialist Belarusian national activists in the first quarter of the 20th century were wiped out of political, scientific and social existence. Only the most famous cult figures (e.g. Yanka Kupala) were spared.

However, a new power group in Belarusian science quickly formed during these power shifts, under the virtual leadership of the Head of the Philosophy Institute of the Belarusian Academy of Sciences, academician Semyon Volfson. The book published under his editorship, Science in Service of Nats-Dems' Counter-Revolution (1931), represented the new spirit of political life in Soviet Belarus.

==== 1933 reform of Belarusian grammar ====
The Reform of Belarusian Grammar (1933) had been brought out with the project published in the central newspaper of the Belarusian Communist Party (Zviazda) on 28 June 1933, and the decree of the Council of People's Commissars (Council of Ministers) of BSSR issued on 28 August 1933, to gain the status of law on 16 September 1933.

Jan Stankievič in his notable critique of the reform failed to mention the 1930 project, dating the reform project to 1932.

The reform resulted in the grammar officially used with further amendments in the Byelorussian SSR and in modern Belarus.

The officially announced causes for the reform were:

- The pre-1933 grammar was maintaining artificial barriers between the Russian and Belarusian languages.
- The reform was to cancel the influences of the Polonisation corrupting the Belarusian language.
- The reform was to remove the archaisms, neologisms and vulgarisms supposedly introduced by the "national-democrats".
- The reform was to simplify the grammar of the Belarusian language.

The reform had been accompanied by a fervent press campaign directed against the "nats-dems not yet giving up".

The decree had been named On Changing and Simplifying Belarusian Spelling, (Note: «Аб зменах і спрашчэнні беларускага правапісу» / „Ab zmienach i spraščenni biełaruskaha pravapisu“) but the bulk of the changes had been introduced into the grammar. Jan Stankievič, in his critique of the reform talked about 25 changes, with one of them being strictly orthographical and 24 relating to both orthography and grammar.

Many of the changes in the orthography proper ("stronger principle of AH-ing", "no redundant soft sign", "uniform nie and biez") were, in fact, simply implementations of earlier proposals made by people who had subsequently suffered political suppression (e.g., Yazep Lyosik, Lastowski, Nyekrashevich, 1930 project).

The morphological principle in the orthography had been strengthened, which also had been proposed in 1920s.

The "removal of the influences of the Polonisation" had been represented, effectively, by the:

- Reducing the use of the "consonant+non-iotated vowel" in assimilated Latinisms in favour of "consonant+iotated vowel", leaving only Д, Т, Р unexceptionally "hard".
- Changing the method of representing the sound "L" in Latinisms to another variant of the Belarusian sound Л (of 4 variants existing), rendered with succeeding non-iotated vowels instead of iotated.
- Introducing the new preferences of use of the letters Ф over Т for theta, and В over Б for beta, in Hellenisms.

The "removing of the artificial barriers between the Russian and Belarusian languages" (virtually the often-quoted "Russification of Belarusian") had – according to Stankyevich – moved the normative Belarusian morphology and syntax closer to their Russian counterparts, often removing from use the indigenous features of the Belarusian language.

Stankyevich also observed that some components of the reform had moved the Belarusian grammar closer to the grammars of other Slavonic languages, which would hardly be its goal.

==== West Belarus ====
In western Belarus, there had been some voices raised against the reform, chiefly by the non-socialist wing of the Belarusian national scene. Yan Stankyevich was named to the Belarusian Scientific Society, Belarusian National Committee and Society of the Friends of Belarusian Linguistics at Wilno University. Certain political and scientific groups and figures went on using the pre-reform orthography and grammar, however, thus multiplying and differing versions.

=== World War II ===
During the Nazi occupation of Belarus, the Belarusian collaborationists influenced newspapers and schools to use the Belarusian language. This variant did not use any of the post-1933 changes in vocabulary, orthography and grammar. Much publishing in Belarusian Latin script was done. In general, in the publications of the Soviet partisan movement in Belarus, the normative 1934 grammar was used.

=== Post World War II ===
Belarusian Speakers in Belarus, 1970 - 2019
Year	Spoken at home		Mother Tongue		Total
Year	#	%	#	%	Total
1970			6,899,088	76.6	9,002,338
1979			6,657,315	69.8	9,532,516
1989			6,664,156	65.6	10,151,806
1999	3,682,607	36.7	7,404,979	73.7	10,045,237
2009	2,227,175	23.4	5,058,402	53.2	9,503,807
2019	2,447,764	26.0	5,094,928	54.1	9,413,446

After the Second World War, several major factors influenced the development of the Belarusian language. The most important was the implementation of the "rapprochement and unification of Soviet people" policy, which resulted by the 1980s in the Russian language effectively and officially assuming the role of the principal means of communication, with Belarusian relegated to a secondary role. The post-war growth in the number of publications in the Belarusian language in BSSR drastically lagged behind those in Russian. The use of Belarusian as the main language of education was gradually limited to rural schools and humanitarian faculties. The BSSR counterpart of the USSR law "On strengthening of ties between school and real life and on the further development of popular education in the USSR" (1958), adopted in 1959, along with introduction of a mandatory 8-year school education, made it possible for the parents of pupils to opt for non-mandatory studying of the "second language of instruction", which would be Belarusian in a Russian language school and vice versa. However, for example in the 1955–56 school year, there were 95% of schools with Russian as the primary language of instruction, and 5% with Belarusian as the primary language of instruction. The Belarusian was mostly used as a language of instruction in Belarusian rural schools or humanities faculties and was popularly regarded as an "uncultured, rural language of rural people". Consequently, Belarusian cities became Russian-speaking in the 1960s due to the lack of education in the Belarusian language in schools and universities.

That was the source of concern for the nationally minded and caused, for example, the series of publications by Barys Sachanka in 1957–61 and the text named "Letter to a Russian Friend" by Alyaksyey Kawka (1979). The BSSR Communist party leader Kirill Mazurov made some tentative moves to strengthen the role of the Belarusian language in the second half of the 1950s.

After the beginning of Perestroika and the relaxing of political control in the late 1980s, a new campaign in support of the Belarusian language was mounted in BSSR, expressed in the "Letter of 58" and other publications, producing a certain level of popular support and resulting in the BSSR Supreme Soviet ratifying the "Law on Languages" (Note: «Закон аб мовах» / „Zakon ab movach“) of 26 January 1990, requiring the strengthening of the role of Belarusian in state and civic structures.

==== 1959 reform of grammar ====
A discussion on problems in Belarusian orthography and on the further development of the language was held from 1935 to 1941. From 1949 to 1957 this continued, although it was deemed there was a need to amend some unwarranted changes to the 1933 reform. The Orthography Commission, headed by Yakub Kolas, set up the project in about 1951, but it was approved only in 1957, and the normative rules were published in 1959. These rules had been accepted as normative for the Belarusian language since then, receiving minor practical changes in the 1985 edition.

A project to correct parts of the 1959 rules was conducted from 2006 to 2007.

=== Post-1991 ===
The process of government support for "Belarusisation" began even before the breakup of the Soviet Union, with the Supreme Soviet of the BSSR passing a law on languages in 1990 that aimed for the gradual increase in prestige and general use of the Belarusian language over the next 10 years, followed by the creation that same year of a National Language Program to support this endeavor. After Belarus became independent in 1991, support for the cause of the Belarusian language gained prestige and popular interest, with the post-Soviet Belarusian government the continued creation of policies to actively promote the use of the Belarusian language, especially in education. The creation of the 1994 Constitution declared Belarusian to be the sole official language, though Russian was given the status as "language of inter-ethnic communication". However, the implementation of the 1992–94 "Law on Languages" took place in such a way that it provoked public protests and was dubbed "Landslide Belarusization" and "undemocratic" by those opposing it in 1992–94.

After the election of Alexander Lukashenko as the President of Belarus in the 1994 elections, the positions of the Belarusian language in the Belarusian education system worsened as the number of first graders who were taught in Belarusian significantly decreased (e.g. in Minsk from 58.6% in 1994 to just 4.8% in 1998) and by 2001 most of the major Belarusian cities had no schools where its pupils were instructed in Belarusian, however Minsk still had 20 Belarusian-language schools. In 1996, Russian language was given equal status to Belarusian following changes in the Constitution of Belarus and subsequently became Belarus's language of administration, business and education. In 1999, only 17% of pupils attended Belarusian-language elementary schools in Belarus. Moreover, a complete minority (~10.5%) of single-circulation newspapers were printed in Belarusian and the amounts decreases each year.

In a referendum held on 14 May 1995 the Belarusian language lost its exclusive status as the only state language. State support for the Belarusian language and culture in general has dwindled since then, and Russian is dominant in everyday life in today's Belarus. In a 2006 article, Roy Medvedev compared the position of the Belarusian language in Belarus with that of the Irish language in the Republic of Ireland. Adam Maldzis considers that one of typological similarities is the official bilinguism both in Belarus and Ireland, and the low real status of the mother-tongue.

A spelling reform of the official Belarusian language, making the spelling of some words more similar to Taraškievič's system, was decided on 23 July 2008, and went into effect on 1 September 2010.

=== Discrimination against Belarusian speakers ===
"People who speak Belarusian cannot do anything, because nothing great can be expressed in Belarusian. The Belarusian language is a poor language. There are only two great languages in the world: Russian and English."

— Alexander Lukashenko in 2006.

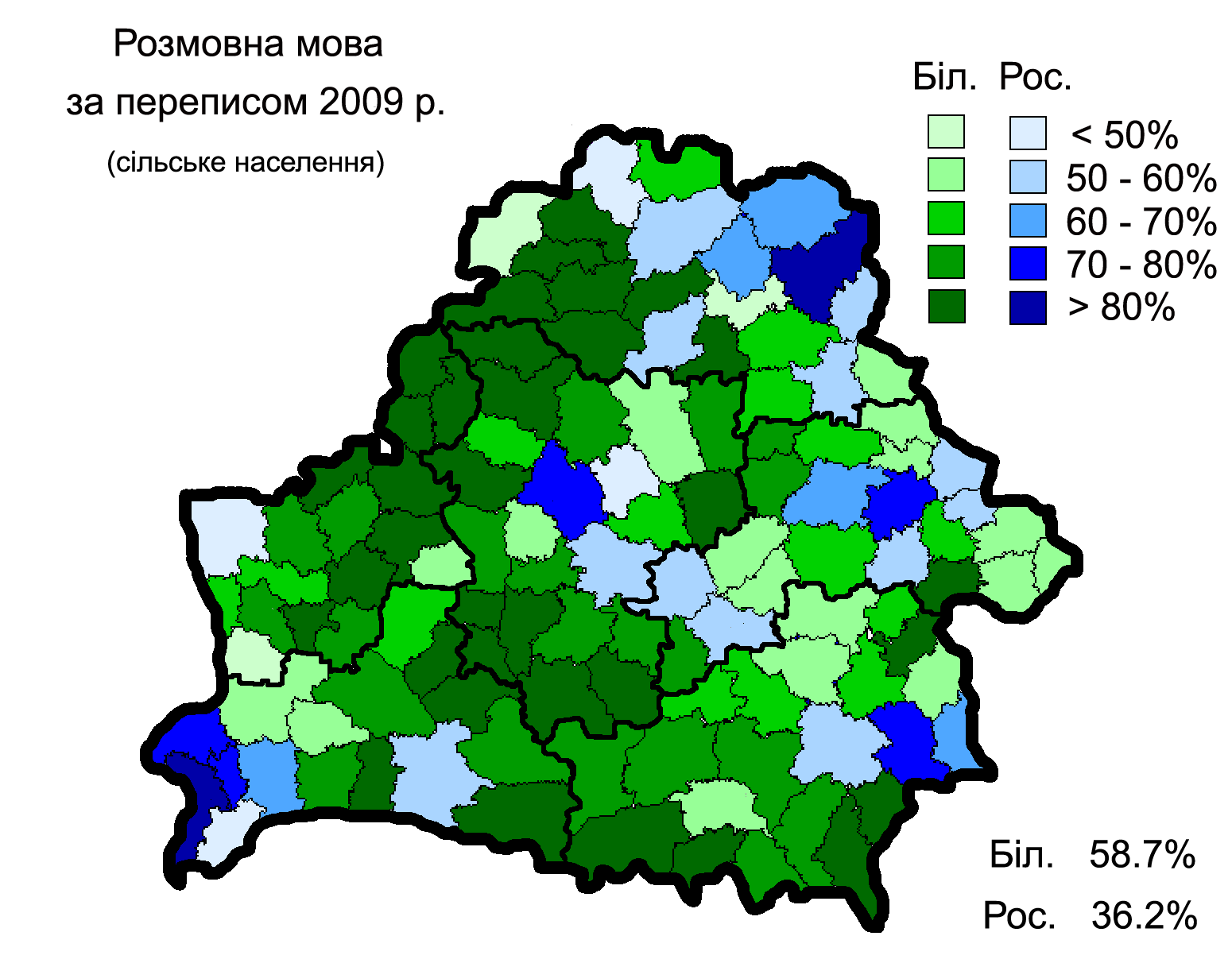
According to the 2009 Belarusian census data, Belarusian (marked in green) was named as the home language by respondees in most of the rural areas of Belarus

Under president Alexander Lukashenko, Belarusian speaking people in Belarus have complained about the discrimination against the Belarusian language in Belarus. Despite a formally equal status of Russian and Belarusian, Russian is primarily used by the Belarusian government, and cases of discrimination against the Belarusian language are not rare, even though the discrimination is not institutionalized. Authorities occasionally make minor concessions to demands for a widening of the usage of the Belarusian language.

Organisations promoting the Belarusian language such as the Francišak Skaryna Belarusian Language Society were reported as being the object of attacks by Belarus-based Russian neo-Nazi groups in the 1990s and 2000s.

The Frantsishak Skaryna Society has reported about the following categories of violations against the rights of Belarusian speakers in Belarus:

- The right to receive public and private services in the Belarusian language;
- The right to access legislation in the Belarusian language;
- The right to receive education in the Belarusian language;
- The right to an equitable presence of the Belarusian language in the media;
- The right to receive full oral and written information in the Belarusian language on the products and services proposed by commercial companies.

Belarusian speakers are facing numerous obstacles when trying to arrange Belarusian language education for their children. As of 2016 there are no Belarusian-language universities in the country.

In its 2016 report on human rights in Belarus, the US State Department also stated that there was "discrimination against … those who sought to use the Belarusian language." "Because the government viewed many proponents of the Belarusian language as political opponents, authorities continued to harass and intimidate academic and cultural groups that sought to promote Belarusian and routinely rejected proposals to widen use of the language".

In 2026, the United Nations Special Rapporteur on the situation of human rights in Belarus noted that "in practice the Belarusian language is subjected to systematic marginalization" and "that violations against Belarusian-language users have increased since August 2020, as authorities increasingly treat the use of Belarusian as a sign of political disloyalty and target both public figures and the general public". "Marginalization of the Belarusian language and discrimination against those who use it are systemic across State institutions, including in the public administration, courts, detention settings, education, media and official communication", according to UN Special Rapporteur. The UN Special Rapporteur notes that the combination of both discrimination tolerated or enabled by state authorities and lack of protection "creates an environment where the use of Belarusian is discouraged and may lead to negative consequences from government officials, administrative pressure or punitive measures against individuals who insist on exercising their linguistic rights".

=== 2010s–2020s ===
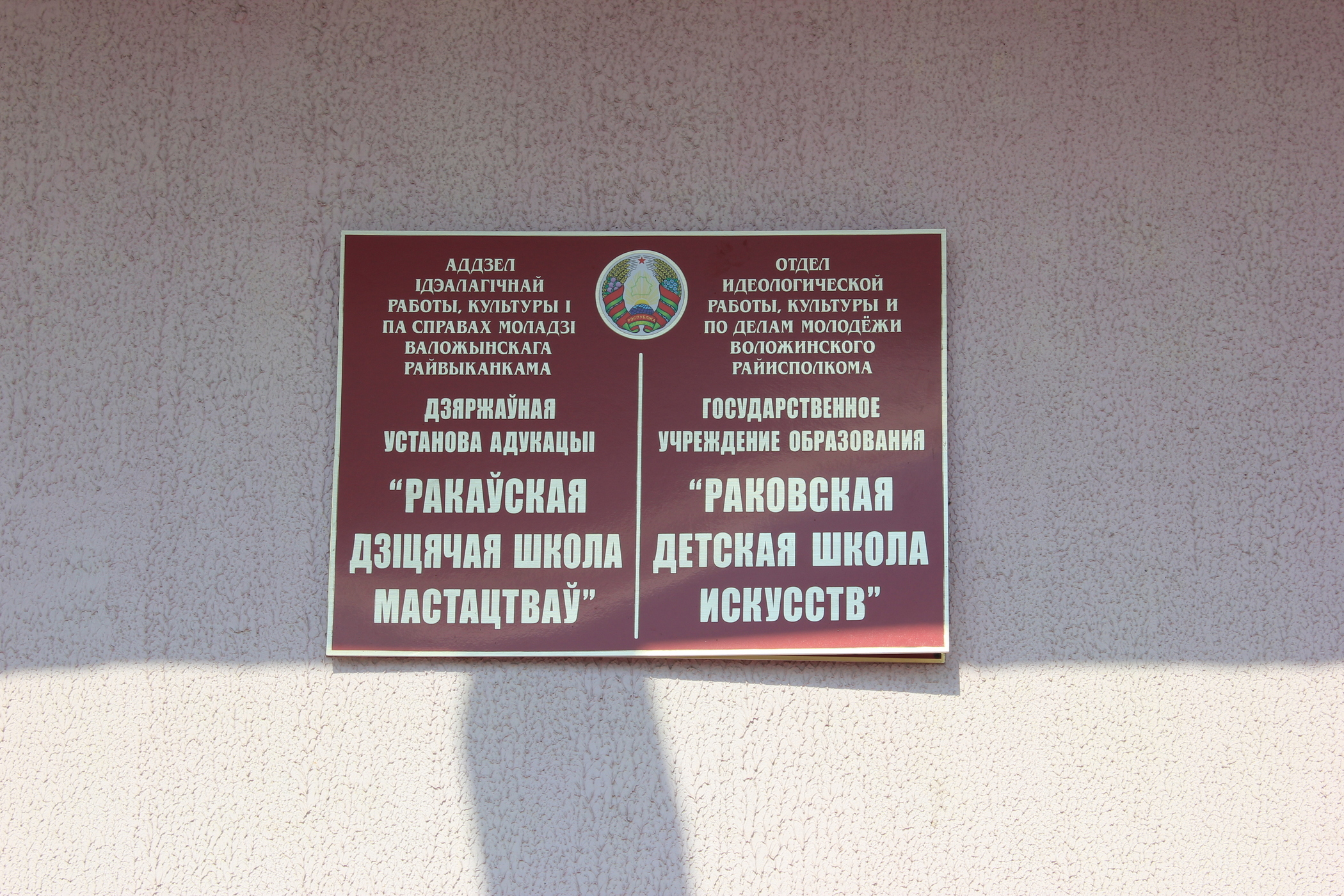
Bilingual Belarusian–Russian sign in Belarusian town Rakaw in 2014

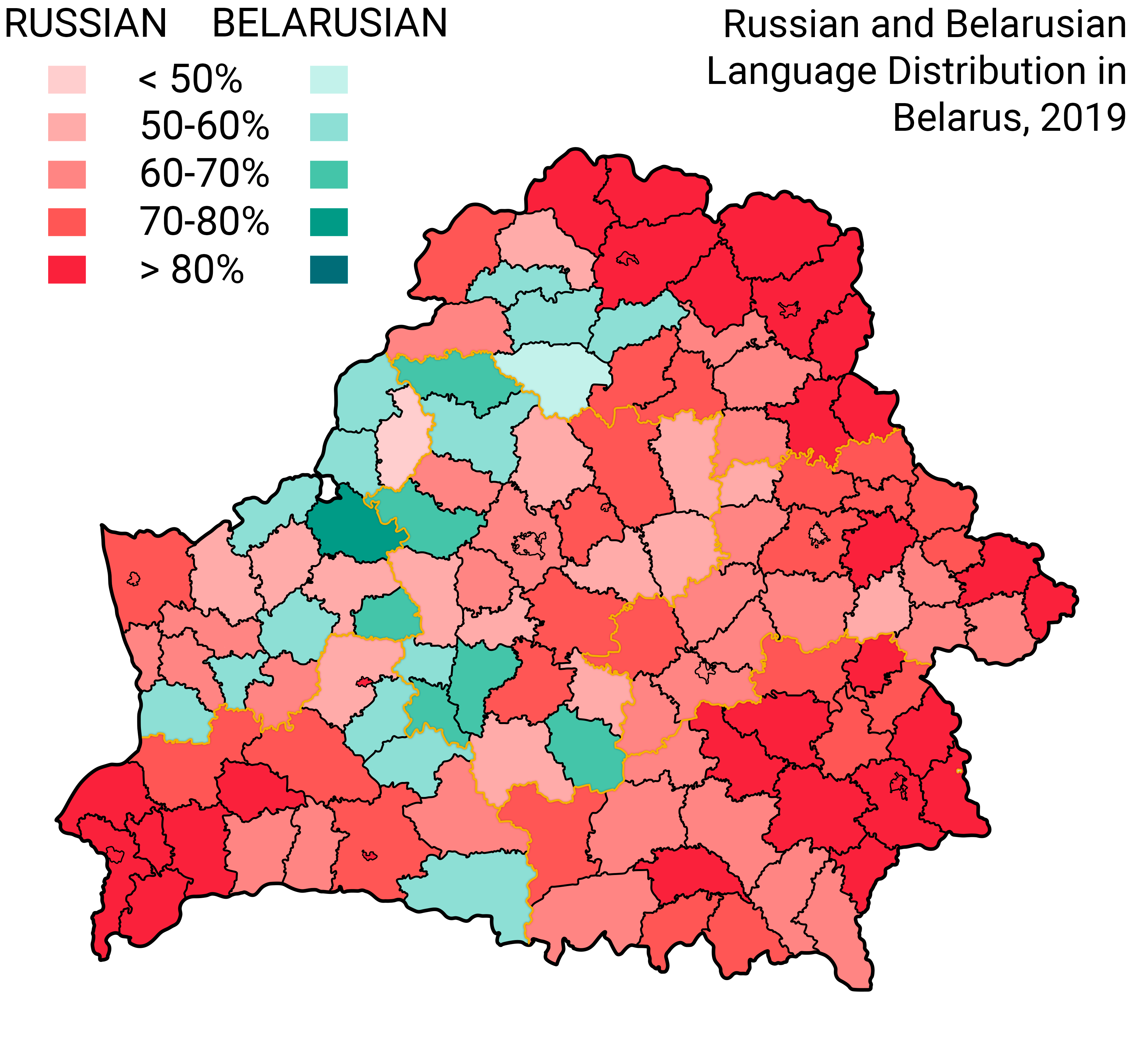
Map showing the distribution of Russian and Belarusian speakers in Belarus, based on 2019 census data

In the 2010s, the situation of Belarusian has started to change slightly due to the efforts of language-advocacy institutions, of individual representatives of such educational, cultural, scientific and linguistic organizations as the Francišak Skaryna Belarusian Language Society, the National Academy of Sciences of Belarus, the Union of Belarusian Writers, and in response to the endeavours of pro-Belarusian public figures from the media and communication field, musicians, philosophers, entrepreneurs and benefactors.

Despite the language losing its exclusive position in the wake of the 1995 Belarusian referendum, new signs of the spread of Belarusian have appeared, trickling down into Belarusian society—with advertising campaigns supporting the cause (outdoor billboards promoting and acquainting people with the Belarusian language, branding campaigns for the leading telecommunication providers like Velcom, etc.), the simplified version of the Belarusian Latin alphabet on the metro map being introduced into the messages of the transport network, dedicated advertising festivals like AD!NAK upholding marketing communication in Belarusian, and informal language-courses (such as Mova Nanova, Mova ci kava, Movavedy) having sprung up in Minsk and around Belarus and spurring further interest of people, especially of young people, in developing good Belarusian communication skills in everyday life.

President Lukashenko, in his 2014 State of the Nation address, emphasized that losing the ability to speak Belarusian will be losing a part of the country's history.

A speaker of Belarusian

The 2019 Belarusian census demonstrated that the Belarusian language is perceived as a native language of Belarus by ~60% of its population, however only ~25% use it in their everyday life. The Belarusian language has marginalized status in terms of usage in Belarus, despite being officially recognized as its state language (along with Russian). The usage of Belarusian in major Belarusian cities is rare. Approximately 95% of Belarusian state operates in the Russian language and the Belarusian language is mostly absent in Belarusian education, state media and government affairs where the main information is provided in Russian. For example, in 2011 Russian-language broadcasts on the Belarusian "state package" TV channels accounted for 35,302 hours of air time and highly overshadowed 626 hours of air time in Belarusian-language (only 1.7% of all air time). None of the universities in Belarus are providing a Belarusian-language education and Belarusian language lessons in schools are declining. In 2016, only 13% of pupils in Belarus attended elementary schools where the language of instruction was Belarusian. The Belarusian language is still partly used in some cultural, traditional and folklore activities. According to Belarusian poet Valzhyna Mort, who grew up in Belarus, the Belarusian language is mocked for its "rural sound" and is considered "useless" in Belarus. According to Belarusian poet Julija Cimafiejeva, the majority of the books sold in Belarus were imported from Russia in 2019 and in comparison to Russian books the Belarusian language books are not common and mostly are related with educational purposes. The annual circulation of Belarusian language literature significantly decreased from 1990 to 2020: magazines (from 312 mil to 39.6 mil), books and brochures (from 9.3 mil to 3.1 mil).

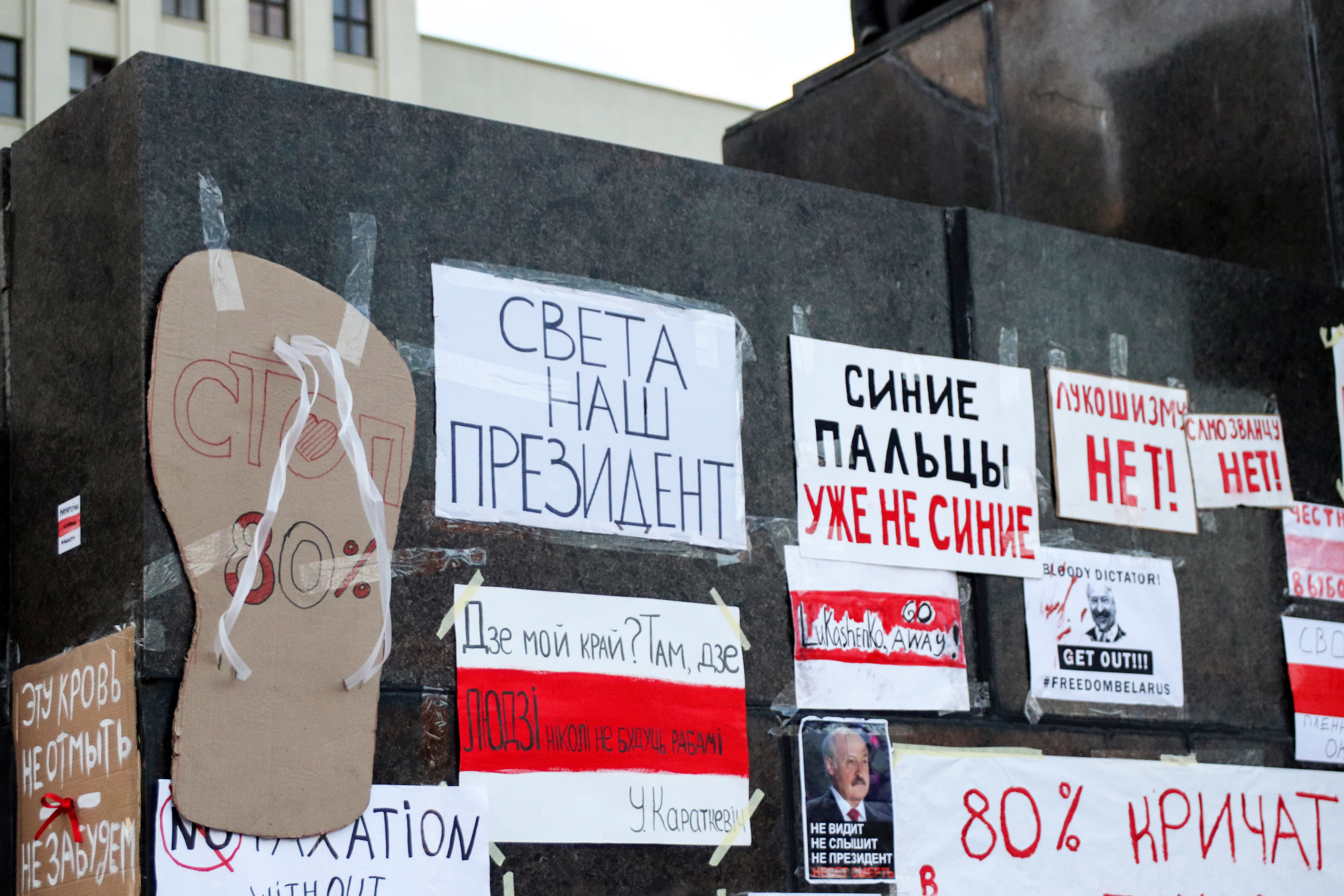
Trilingual Belarusian-English-Russian signs during the 2020–2021 Belarusian protests in Minsk

Belarusian speakers in Belarus are viewed as those who are against the Lukashenko's government and politically motivated charges were applied to them. In 2020, following the beginning of the 2020–2021 Belarusian protests, many Belarusian writers and artists were repressed in Belarus. In August 2021, Belarusian PEN Centre, Union of Belarusian Writers and the Belarusian Association of Journalists were liquidated and the Ministry of Justice of Belarus applied for liquidation of the Francišak Skaryna Belarusian Language Society in the Supreme Court of Belarus.

=== Taraškievica ===
There exists an alternative literary norm of the Belarusian language, named Taraškievica (Tarashkevica). Its promoters and users prevalently refer to it as Kłasyčny pravapis ('Classic orthography'). Generally Taraškievica favours Polish-inspired pronunciations (плян, plan; філязофія, filazofija), while regular Belarusian follows Russian-inspired pronunciations (план, płan; філасофія, fiłasofija). Taraškievica also features a more phonetic spelling system, particularly using a separate letter for the [g] sound, which is argued to be an allophone of /ɣ/ rather than a separate phoneme.

== Phonology ==
Although closely related to other East Slavic languages, Belarusian phonology is distinct in a number of ways. The phonemic inventory of the modern Belarusian language consists of 45 to 54 phonemes: 6 vowels and 39 to 48 consonants, depending on how they are counted. When the nine geminate consonants are excluded as mere variations, there are 39 consonants, and excluding rare consonants further decreases the count. The number 48 includes all consonant sounds, including variations and rare sounds, which may be phonetically distinct in modern Belarusian.

== Alphabet ==
The Belarusian alphabet is a variant of the Cyrillic script, which was first used as an alphabet for the Old Church Slavonic language. The modern Belarusian form was defined in 1918, and consists of thirty-two letters. Before that, Belarusian had also been written in the Belarusian Latin alphabet (Лацінка / Łacinka), the Belarusian Arabic alphabet (by Lipka Tatars), and the Hebrew alphabet (by Belarusian Jews).

== Grammar ==
Standardized Belarusian grammar in its modern form was adopted in 1959, with minor amendments in 1985 and 2008. It was developed from the initial form set down by Branislaw Tarashkyevich (first printed in Vilnius, 1918), and it is mainly based on the Belarusian folk dialects of Minsk-Vilnius region. Historically, there have been several other alternative standardized forms of Belarusian grammar.

Belarusian grammar is mostly synthetic and partly analytic, and overall quite similar to Russian grammar. Belarusian orthography, however, differs significantly from Russian orthography in some respects, due to the fact that it is a phonemic orthography that closely represents the surface phonology, whereas Russian orthography represents the underlying morphophonology.

The most significant instance of this is found in the representation of vowel reduction, and in particular akanje, the merger of unstressed /a/ and /o/, which exists in both Russian and Belarusian. Belarusian always spells this merged sound as ⟨a⟩, whereas Russian uses either ⟨a⟩ or ⟨o⟩, according to what the "underlying" phoneme is (determined by identifying the related words where the vowel is being stressed or, if no such words exist, by written tradition, mostly but not always conforming to etymology). This means that Belarusian noun and verb paradigms, in their written form, have numerous instances of alternations between written ⟨a⟩ and ⟨o⟩, whereas no such alternations exist in the corresponding written paradigms in Russian. This can significantly complicate the foreign speakers' task of learning these paradigms; on the other hand, though, it makes spelling easier for native speakers.

An example illustrating the contrast between the treatment of akanje in Russian and Belarusian orthography is the spelling of the word for "products; food":

- In Ukrainian: продукти (pronounced "produkty", IPA: [pro'duktɪ])
- In Russian: продукты (pronounced "pradukty", IPA: [prɐˈduktɨ])
- In Belarusian: прадукты (pronounced "pradukty", IPA: [pra'duktɨ])

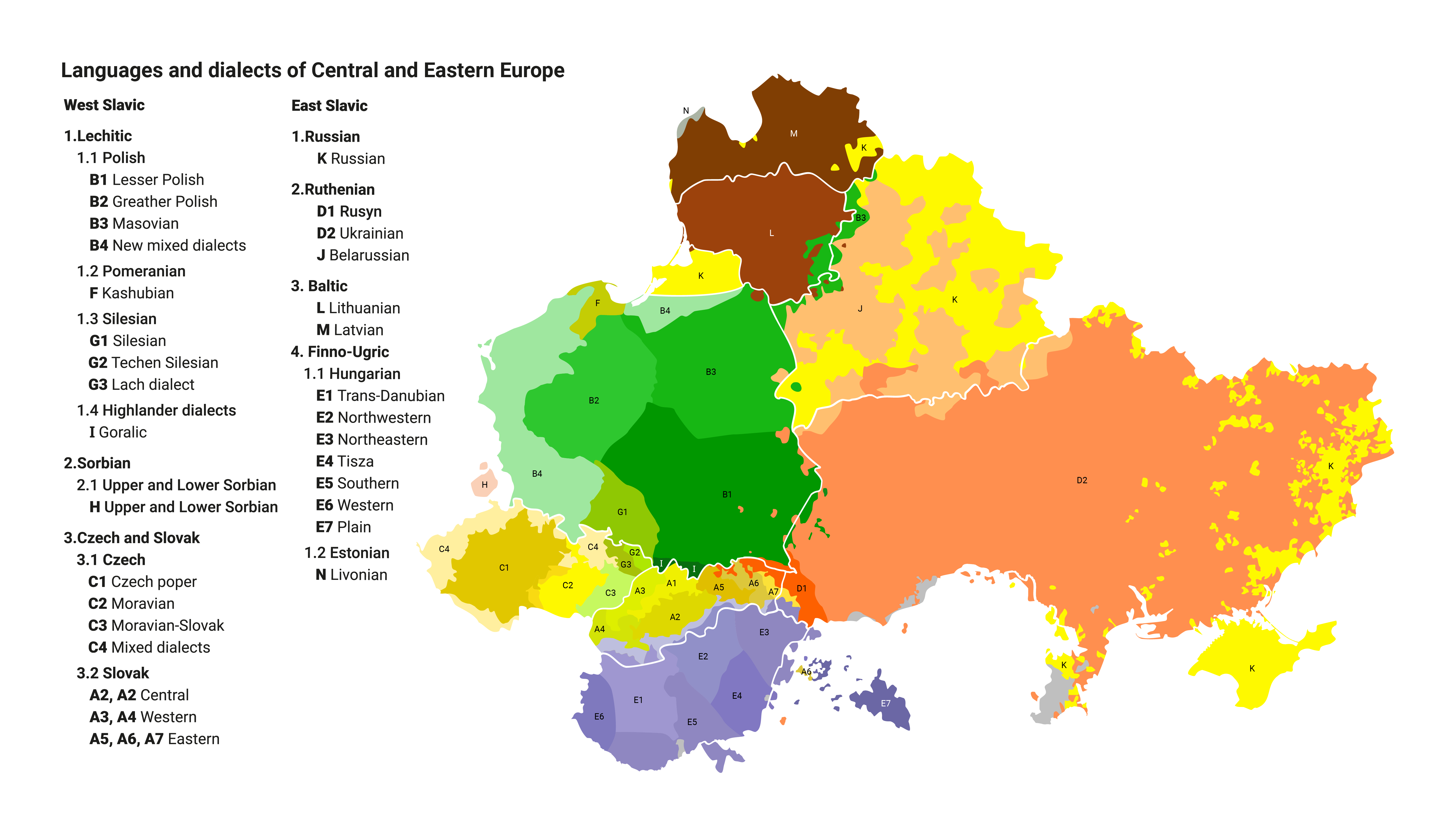
Map of languages and dialects of Central and Eastern Europe

== Computer representation ==
Belarusian is represented by the ISO 639 code be or bel, or more specifically by IETF language tags be-1959acad (so-called "Academic" ["governmental"] variant of Belarusian as codified in 1959) or be-tarask (Belarusian in Taraskievica orthography).

== Sample text ==
Article 1 of the Universal Declaration of Human Rights in Belarusian (be-1959acad):

Усе людзі нараджаюцца свабоднымі і роўнымі ў сваёй годнасці і правах. Яны надзелены розумам і сумленнем і павінны ставіцца адзін да аднаго ў духу брацтва.

The same text using the Taraškievica orthography (be-tarask):

Усе людзі нараджаюцца свабоднымі й роўнымі ў сваёй годнасьці й правох. Яны надзеленыя розумам і сумленьнем і павінны ставіцца адзін да аднаго ў духу брацтва.

The romanization of the text into Latin alphabet:

Usie ludzi naradžajucca svabodnymi j roŭnymi ŭ svajoj hodnaści j pravoch. Jany nadzielenyja rozumam i sumleńniem i pavinny stavicca adzin da adnaho ŭ duchu bractva.

Article 1 of the Universal Declaration of Human Rights in English:

All human beings are born free and equal in dignity and rights. They are endowed with reason and conscience and should act towards one another in a spirit of brotherhood.

== See also ==
- Russification of Belarus
- Trasianka – a blend of the Russian and Belarusian languages spoken by many in Belarus
