= Spread of the Latin script =

Current distribution of the Latin script. Countries where the Latin script is the sole main script Countries where Latin co-exists with other scripts

The spread of the Latin script has a long history, from its archaic beginnings in Latium to its rise as the dominant writing system in modernity. The ancestors of Latin letters are found in the Phoenician, Greek, and Etruscan alphabets. As the Roman Empire expanded in classical antiquity, the Latin script and language spread along with its conquests, and remained in use in Italy, Iberia, and Western Europe after the Western Roman Empire's disappearance. During the early and high Middle Ages, the script was spread by Christian missionaries and rulers, replacing the indigenous writing systems of Central Europe, Northern Europe, and the British Isles.

In the Age of Discovery, the first wave of European colonization saw the adoption of Latin alphabets primarily in the Americas and Australia, whereas sub-Saharan Africa, maritime Southeast Asia, and the Pacific were Latinised in the period of New Imperialism. Realizing that Latin was now the most widely used script on Earth, the Bolsheviks made efforts to develop and establish Latin alphabets for all languages in the lands they controlled in Eastern Europe, North and Central Asia. However, after the Soviet Union's first three decades, these were gradually abandoned in the 1930s in favour of Cyrillic. Some post-Soviet Turkic-majority states decided to reintroduce the Latin script in the 1990s, following the 1928 example of Turkey. In the early 21st century, non-Latin writing systems were only still prevalent in most parts of the Middle East and North Africa, the post-Soviet states, Asia, and some Balkan countries.

== Protohistory ==
The Marsiliana tablet (c. 700 BCE), containing the earliest known Etruscan abecedarium.

The Latin script originated in archaic antiquity in the Latium region in central Italy. It is generally held that the Latins, one of many ancient Italic tribes, adopted the western variant of the Greek alphabet in the 7th century BCE from Cumae, a Greek colony in southern Italy – making the early Latin alphabet one among several Old Italic scripts emerging at the time. The early Latin script was heavily influenced by the then regionally dominant Etruscan civilization; the Latins ultimately adopted 22 of the original 26 Etruscan letters, which derived from Western Greek as well. It is highly probable that the Latins received their alphabet via the Etruscans rather than directly from the Greek colonists.

== Antiquity ==
=== Latinisation of Italy ===
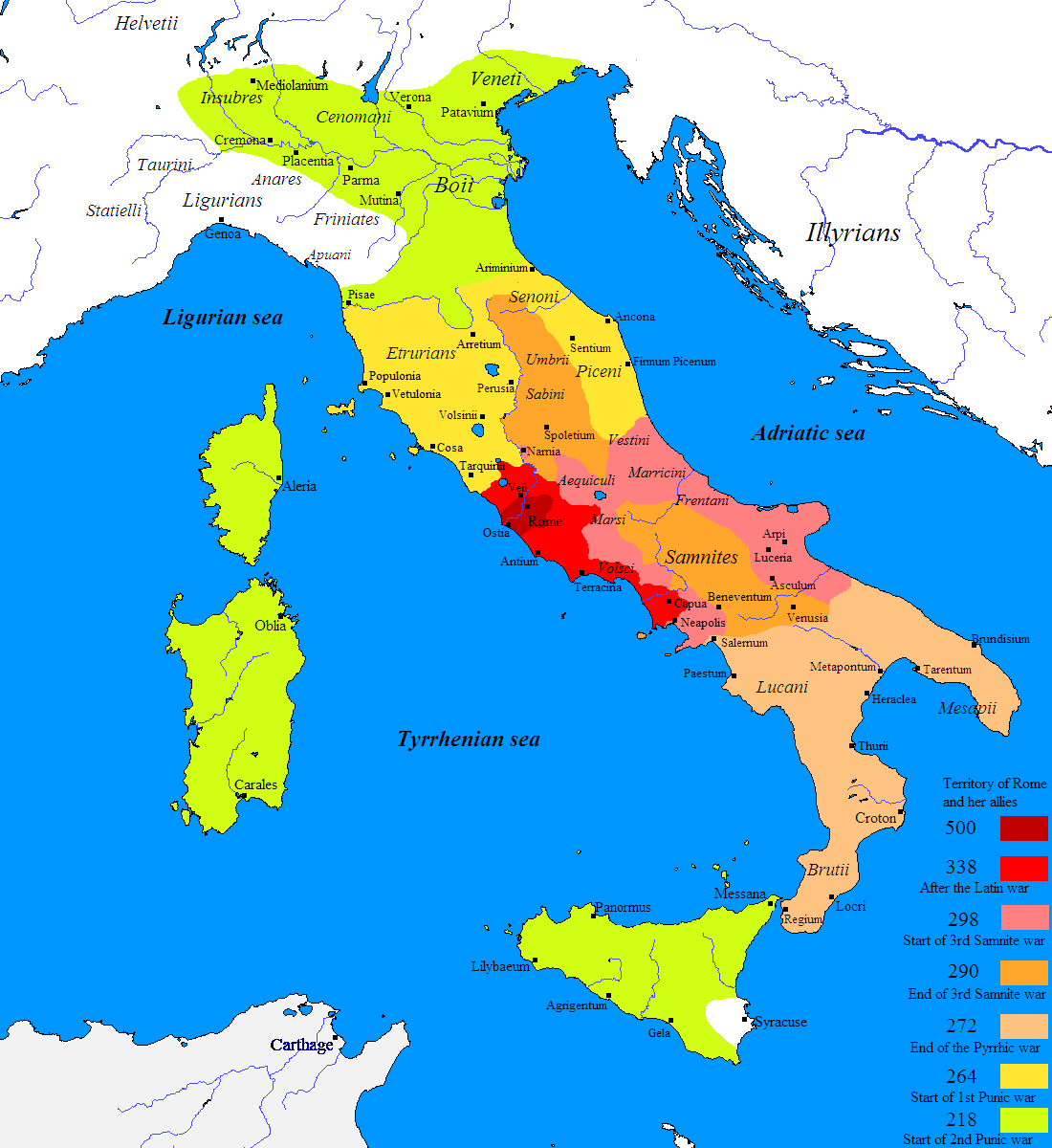
Roman expansion in Italy from 500 BC to 218 BC through the Latin War (light red), Samnite Wars (pink/orange), Pyrrhic War (beige), and First and Second Punic War (yellow and green). Cisalpine Gaul (238-146 BC) and Alpine valleys (16-7 BC) were later added. The Roman Republic in 500 BC is marked with dark red. Roman expansion in Italy spread the Latin script

Along with the Latin language, the Latin writing system first spread over the Italian Peninsula with the rise of the Roman Republic from the 4th to the 1st century BCE. By the 4th century, the Latin alphabet had been standardised by the city of Rome and begun to dominate Latium. Other local alphabets in Latium fell into disuse, particularly after the Latin War (340–338 BCE). There is evidence for a phase of bilingualism and digraphia in the late 4th and 3rd centuries in Etruria, Campania, Umbria, and most other Central Italian regions that were conquered by the Romans (primarily during the Samnite Wars of 343–290 BCE), or maintained frequent contact with the Romans and other Latins, who set up numerous coloniae in annexed and allied territories. The participation of Italic peoples in the Roman army accelerated the Romanisation and Latinisation process.

Umbria seems to have switched from its own script in the 2nd century BCE to Latin in the 1st. After the subjugation of Southern Italy in the Pyrrhic War (280–275 BCE), Messapic (using a Greek-derived alphabet) disappeared completely, and with the exception of the two Griko enclaves that still exist in the 21st century, Latin replaced all Greek in Magna Graecia. Livy reports that the local government of Cumae – the Greek colony that may have originally spread its alphabet to the Latins via the Etruscans – made an unsolicited request in the 2nd century BCE to henceforth use Latin in public affairs. After the First Punic War (264–241 BCE), the Latin script gradually took over written communication on Sardinia from Paleo-Sardinian (also termed "Nuragic"), on Corsica from Paleo-Corsican, and on Sicily from Greek and the local Sicula, Sicani, and Elymian languages. The Roman conquest of Mediolanum (Milan) in 222 BCE commenced the Latinisation of the Po Valley.

The Latinisation of Italy was resisted by various ethnic groups, however, most notably the Samnites, who regarded their Oscan language and script as part of their identity, and employed it in clear opposition to Rome, for example in coinage during the Social War (91–87 BCE). The Veneti, though steadfast allies of the Romans for centuries, retained their own alphabet until the end of the Roman Republic (27 BCE). According to Lomas (2004), the crucial factor in Latinising these remaining groups that resisted full integration was granting them Roman citizenship (most notably by the Lex Iulia de Civitate Latinis et Sociis Danda in 90 BCE), thereby leading them to participate in Roman–Latin society and gradually abandon their Italic, Etruscan, Celtic etc. cultural independence.

=== Western Mediterranean and Gaul ===
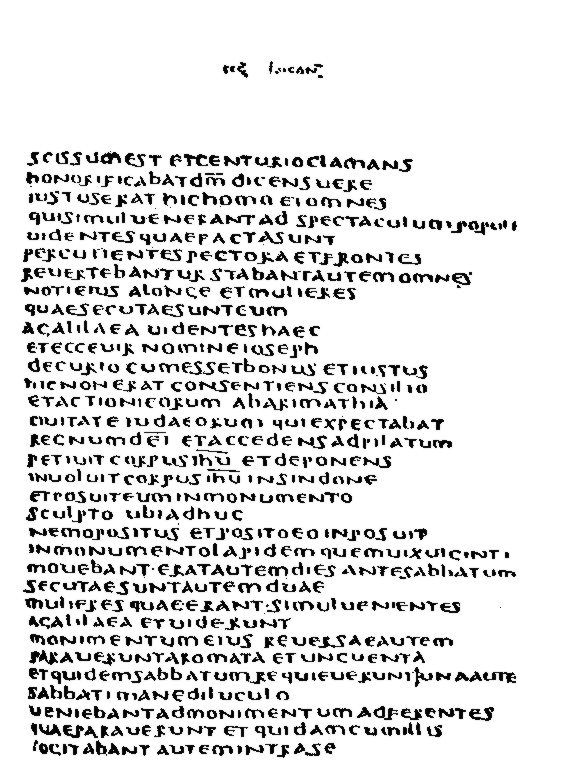
Latin uncial sample of the Codex Bezae (6th century CE), a New Testament copy from Gaul or Italy

The Roman conquest of the Iberian Peninsula (206–19 BCE) drove all indigenous writing systems such as the Iberian scripts extinct. Likewise, Caesar's conquest of Gaul (58–50 BCE) sealed the fate of the Greek-derived alphabets used by various Gallic tribes. According to Miles (2013) 'there was a sudden and complete disappearance of Iberian and Gallo-Greek scripts by the mid first century AD.' The Iberian language was spoken until at least the 1st century CE; the Basque language is still spoken in the 21st century, but uses a 27-letter Latin alphabet for writing. The new Gallo-Roman elite used the Latin script to write texts in Celtic languages, and 'Gallo-Latin inscriptions flourished alongside Latin texts'. Gregory of Tours (6th century CE) claimed that Gaulish was still spoken in some countrysides.

After the defeat of Ancient Carthage (Third Punic War 149–146 BCE), the Punic-speaking urban centres of North Africa were Latinised to an extent, while the rural areas remained Berber-speaking. Bilingual inscriptions emerged in the 1st century CE, and Punic inscriptions have been found on public buildings in Africa Proconsularis until the late 2nd century CE. Although the Muslim conquest of the Maghreb (7th–8th centuries CE) led to the eventual Arabisation of North Africa (Arabic being a semitic language like Punic), an account by geographer Muhammad al-Idrisi about 'the African Latin language' spoken by most inhabitants of the Tunisian city of Gafsa (Latin: Capsa) may be evidence that the Latin script was still used there in the 12th century.

There were similar events during the early period of expansion of the Roman Empire (c. 27 BCE – 117 CE) in regions such as Numidia, Rhaetia, Noricum, Belgica, and western Germania. On the other hand, the Roman conquest of Britain (42–87 CE) never led to deep Latinisation of the local population; although most inscriptions found are in Latin, the tribes continued to speak Brittonic dialects.

=== Eastern Mediterranean and the Roman legacy ===
The eastern half of the Empire, including Greece, Macedonia, Asia Minor, the Levant, and Egypt, continued to use Greek as a lingua franca after the Macedonian Wars (214–148 BCE) due to the enduring legacy of Ancient Greek culture; Latin was restricted to administrative and military purposes in the Eastern Mediterranean. Only in the western half was Latin widely spoken and written, and as the western Romance languages evolved out of Latin, they continued to use and adapt the Latin alphabet. There were two major exceptions to this "Greek East and Latin West" rule:

- Illyria, which was annexed as the province of Dalmatia, fully Latinised, and after Rome's fall evolved the Dalmatian language which lasted until 1898.
- After Trajan subdued the lower Danube region in the Dacian Wars (101–106), the Dacian and Thracian languages were abandoned in favour of Latin, out of which developed modern Romanian.

Despite the loss of the Latin-speaking Western provinces in the 5th and 6th centuries, the Byzantine Empire maintained Latin as its legal language, under 6th-century emperor Justinian I producing the vast Corpus Juris Civilis that would have a major impact on Western European legal history from c. 1100 to 1900. The use of Latin as the Byzantine language of administration persisted until the adoption of Middle Greek as the sole official language by Heraclius in the 7th century. Scholarly Latin rapidly fell into disuse among the educated classes, although the language continued to be at least a ceremonial part of the Empire's culture for some time.

== Middle Ages ==
=== Migration Period ===
The Germanic peoples that invaded and gradually settled the Western Roman Empire between the 5th and 8th centuries originally had little written culture to speak of; apart from some runic inscriptions amongst most tribes, there was no written administration or literature, and oral tradition prevailed instead. After the Migration Period (c. 300–800), the Germanic elite not only adopted the Latin script and spread it further, but usually also employed the Latin language for early medieval politics and literature. A slight exception to this is Anglo-Saxon England, where apart from Latin itself, the Latin-derived Insular script gave rise to the Old English Latin alphabet that was also regularly used for writing in the vernacular from the 7th century.

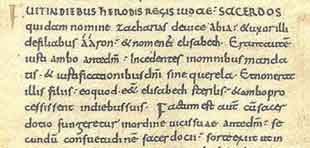
Example of Carolingian minuscule from a 10th-century manuscript

In Western Europe, the Franks were instrumental in spreading and developing the majuscule uncial and half-uncial scripts (used for Greek and Latin texts from the 4th to the 9th centuries), first into the Merovingian script (7th–8th century), later the Carolingian minuscule (9th–12th centuries). Most of this work was done on parchment codices (replacing the earlier papyrus scrolls) by Frankish monks in scriptoria of monasteries, with a focus on preserving classical Greek and Latin texts as well as Biblical books and patristic commentaries through copying.

Many Central European regions south of the limes that were never fully Latinised in Roman times, including modern Austria, Bavaria, Baden-Württemberg, the Rhineland, Alsace (Alsatian and Lorraine Franconian), and Alemannic Switzerland, all (re-)Germanised at different points in late Antiquity due to the large influx of Germanic-speaking groups from the north. While there are a few Germanic runic inscriptions from before the mid-8th century, all Old High German texts are written with the Latin alphabet. However, because it was ill-suited for representing some of the sounds of Old High German, this led to considerable variations in spelling conventions, as individual scribes and scriptoria had to develop their own solutions to these problems.

=== Christianisation ===
The spread of Western Christianity during the early Middle Ages strongly contributed to spreading the Latin script across Europe, especially in areas beyond the old Roman limes that barely had any written culture up to that point, such as Scandinavia and East Central Europe. Western Christian missionaries associated the non-Latin scripts with paganism, and therefore insisted on their abandonment. The European peoples who were gradually converted to Latin Christianity and carved their own alphabets out of it spoke Celtic languages (displacing the Ogham alphabet since the 5th century), Germanic languages (displacing the earlier runic alphabets 'fuþark' and 'fuþorc' since the 8th century), Baltic languages, Uralic languages such as Hungarian, Finnish and Estonian, and Slavic languages. The Carolingian minuscule was extensively used in the Holy Roman Empire from 800 to 1200. The blackletter or Gothic script evolved from it in the 12th and 13th centuries, and was commonplace in Germany as Fraktur from the 16th up to the 20th centuries. In the rest of Latin Christendom, the Gothic script was restricted to the Church, and disappeared centuries earlier.

The Latin script was introduced to Scandinavia in the 9th century, first in Denmark. It reached Norway during the 11th-century Christianisation, but in two different forms: the Anglo-Saxon Insular script in Western Norway and the Carolingian minuscule in Eastern Norway. Scandinavia went through a phase of digraphia between Latin letters and Norse runes before abandoning the latter, with some individuals being proficient in both during this transition. It was not until the early 14th century that the Scandinavian vernaculars developed into fully-fledged written languages, and literature became more dominant than oral culture.

The spread of the Latin and Cyrillic scripts in Eastern Europe was closely connected to the competing missionary efforts of the Catholic Church in Rome and the Eastern Orthodox Church in Constantinople. In areas where both were proselytising to pagan Europeans, such as the Grand Duchy of Lithuania, the Croatian Duchy and the Principality of Serbia, mixtures of languages, scripts and alphabets emerged, and the lines between Latin Catholic (Latinitas) and Cyrillic Orthodox literacy (Slavia Orthodoxa) were blurred. The administrative literacy of Lithuania, for example, was gradually Latinised after it united with the Polish Crown in the late 14th century, but the realm retained the Ruthenian language and Cyrillic script for pragmatic literature, and some local books of terrestrial tribunals used Latin and Cyrillic on the same page.

Generally speaking, the Latin script came into use for writing the West Slavic languages and several South Slavic languages such as Slovene and Croatian, as the people who spoke them adopted Roman Catholicism. The speakers of East Slavic languages generally adopted Cyrillic along with Orthodox Christianity. Modern Serbian, Bosnian and Montenegrin have come to use both scripts, whilst the Eastern South Slavic Bulgarian and Macedonian languages have maintained Cyrillic only.

== Early modern period ==
As late as 1500, the Latin script was limited primarily to the languages spoken in Western, South Western, Northern and Central Europe. The Orthodox Christian Slavs of Eastern and Southeastern Europe mostly used Cyrillic, and Greek speakers around the eastern Mediterranean used the Greek alphabet. The Arabic script was widespread in the Islamic world, among both Arabs and non-Arab nations like the Iranians, Indonesians, Malays, and Turkic peoples, as well as amongst Arab Christians. Most of the rest of Asia used a variety of Brahmic alphabets or the Chinese script.

Since the 15th and especially 16th centuries, European colonisation has spread the Latin script around the world, to the Americas, Oceania, and parts of Asia and Africa (until about 1880 mostly limited to the coastal areas) and the Pacific, along with the Spanish, Portuguese, English, French, and Dutch languages.

=== Americas ===
In an effort to Christianise and 'civilise' the Mayans, the Roman Catholic bishop Diego de Landa of Yucatán ordered the burning of most Maya codices in July 1562, and with it the near destruction of the Mayan hieroglyphic script. He then rewrote the history of the Mayans in Spanish, and the Mayan language was romanised, leading to an enormous loss in culture.

Latin letters served as an inspiration for the forms of the Cherokee syllabary developed by Sequoyah in the late 1810s and early 1820s; however, Latin influence is mainly superficial, with Sequoyah having freely created new syllabograms.

=== South Asia ===
The only South Asian language that has widely adopted the Latin script is Konkani (in the 16th century), spoken on the midwestern Indian coast. Attempts to introduce Latin alphabets instead of Brahmi-derived scripts for other Indian languages have so far been unsuccessful. Nevertheless, British colonialism introduced the widespread use of the Latin-lettered English language in the subcontinent, which has retained and even expanded its prominence in the post-independence era in both India and Pakistan.

=== Southeast Asia and Pacific ===
The Latin script was introduced for many Austronesian languages, including the languages of Indonesia and the Philippines, replacing earlier Arabic and indigenous Brahmic alphabets. The Latin script fits the phonology of Austronesian languages very well, which helped speed up its adoption, as well as helping it to mostly displace the Arabic-based Jawi script in Muslim countries, especially Indonesia. (This is in contrast to other languages in mainland Asia, where Latin script is a much poorer fit and would require heavy use of diacritics, as with Vietnamese, which actually did adopt Latin script.)

During the Dutch rule on Formosa (1624–1662), the island currently known as Taiwan, the Siraya language was given a Sinckan Latin alphabet by the Dutch, which lasted until the 19th century.

== 19th century ==
=== Africa ===
The Scramble for Africa (1881–1914), meaning the rapid occupation, colonisation and annexation of inland Africa by European powers, went hand in hand with the spread of literacy amongst native Africans, as the Latin script was introduced where there were other writing systems or none. Until the early 19th century, the Berber peoples in North Africa had two systems: originally Tifinagh, and, following the spread of Islam, the Arabic script as well. French colonists, particularly missionaries and army linguists, developed a Berber Latin alphabet to make communication easier, especially for the Kabyle people in French Algeria. Since no great body of Berber literature existed, and the colonisers greatly helped improve literacy rates, the romanisation received much support, more so after Algerian independence (1962) when the French-educated Kabyle intelligentsia began to stimulate the transition and especially since the establishment of a standard transcription for Kabylie in 1970. Similar French attempts to Latinise the Arabic language met much more resistance, were unsuccessful and eventually abandoned.

=== Galicia ===
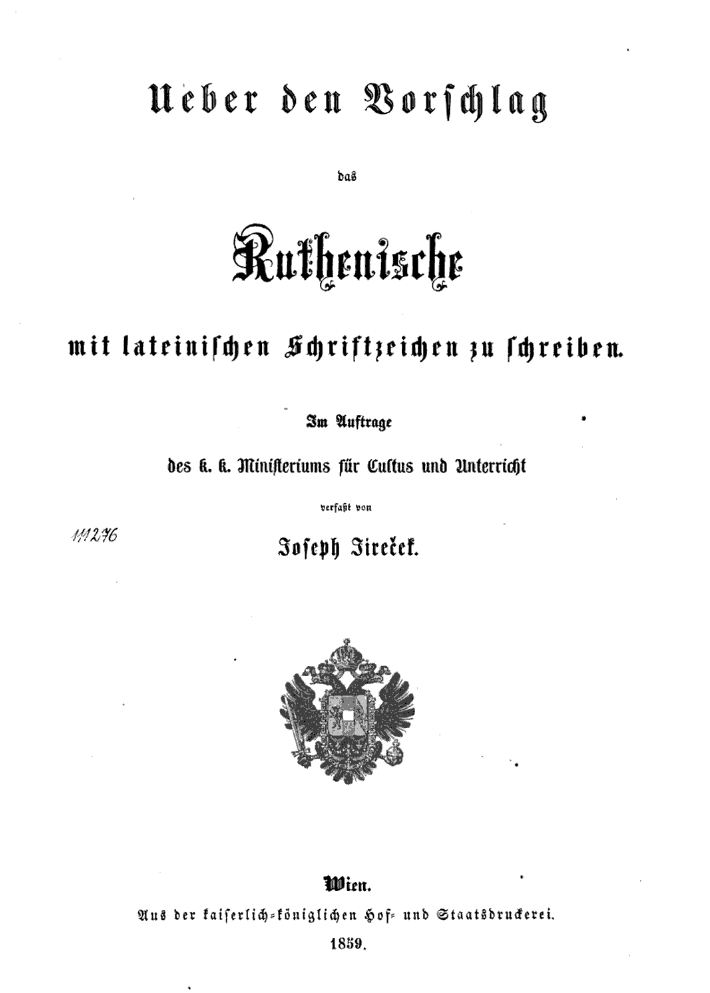
Jireček's "Proposal to Write Ruthenian With Latin Letters", published in 1859 in Vienna

From the 1830s to the 1880s, Ukrainians in Galicia (then divided between the Austrian Empire and Russian Empire) were engaged in a linguistics controversy known as the Alphabetical War. They discussed whether the Ukrainian language (then known as "Ruthenian") was best written in the Latin script (based on the Czech model) against perceived Russification, or in the Cyrillic script against perceived Polonisation. In the end, Cyrillic prevailed.

=== Romanian ===
People speaking Romanian gradually adopted the Latin alphabet in the 19th century, following centuries of usage of the Romanian Cyrillic alphabet. They did so under the influence of nationalism. Some of the earliest to do so were scholars from the late-18th-century Transylvanian School, who modified the Hungarian Latin alphabet for writing Romanian. The linguist Ion Heliade Rădulescu first proposed a simplified version of Cyrillic in 1829, but in 1838, he introduced a mixed alphabet containing 19 Cyrillic and 10 Latin letters, and an [i] and [o] that could be both. This 'transitional orthography' was widely used until the official adoption of a completely Latin Romanian alphabet in Wallachia (1860) and Moldavia (1863), that were gradually united since 1859 to become the Kingdom of Romania in 1881. Romanian intellectuals in Hungary (part of Austria-Hungary), mainly in Transylvania and Banat, and scholars in Wallachia-Moldavia agreed to cleanse the language from all non-Latin elements (Greek, Magyar, Slavic, and Ottoman), and to emulate French wherever needed.

=== Russian Empire ===
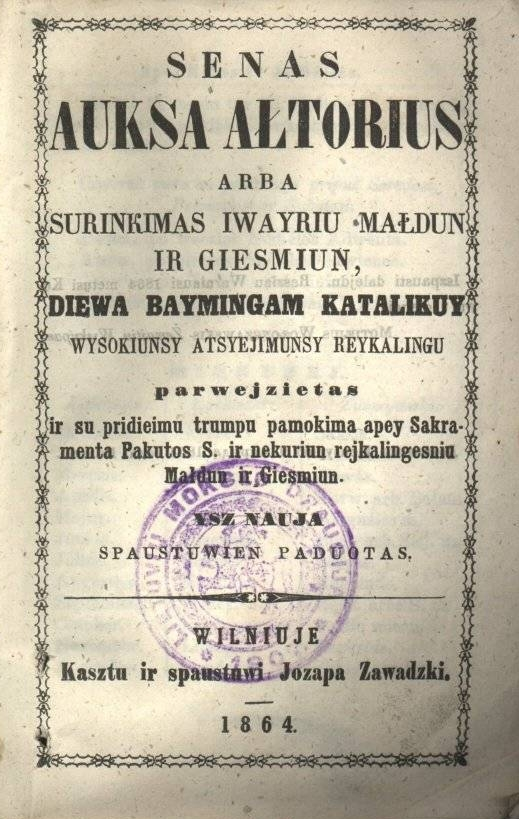
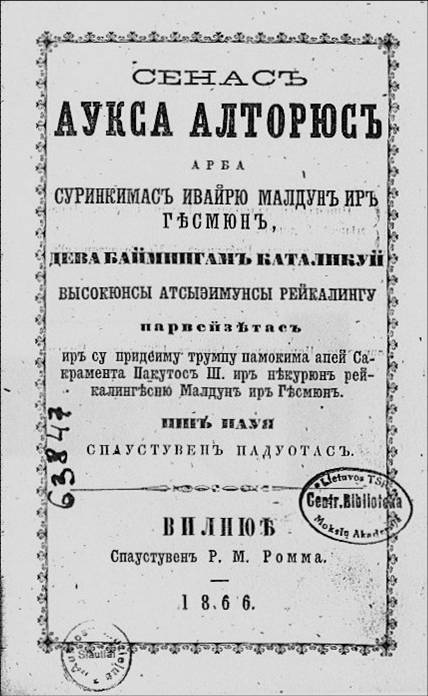
The Lithuanian press ban in action: two issues of the same popular prayer book. The Latin left one was illegal, the right Cyrillic one was legal and paid for by the government.

Russian and Polish are both Slavic languages and have many similarities, thus from the 1840s on, Russia considered introducing the Cyrillic script for spelling the Polish language, with the first school books printed in the 1860s. The idea was quickly abandoned due to Polish being completely substituted by Russian in education as part of Russification process.

The initially successfully enacted Lithuanian press ban (1865–1904) outlawed the use of Latin script, whilst encouraging writing Lithuanian texts in Cyrillic. Resistance grew as time went on: Lithuanian books were smuggled into the country, mainly from Lithuania Minor in East Prussia. Although the Russian authorities tried to seize them, they could not stop the rapid increase in forbidden titles from crossing the border. The Lithuanian ban, lifted in 1904, is widely felt to have stimulated the Lithuanian national movement and embracing the Latin script, rather than discouraging it.

=== Vietnam ===
A romanization of Vietnamese was codified in the 17th century by the French Jesuit missionary Alexandre de Rhodes (1591–1660), based on works of the early 16th-century Portuguese missionaries Gaspar do Amaral and António Barbosa. This Vietnamese alphabet (chữ quốc ngữ or "national script") was gradually expanded from its initial domain in Christian writing to become more popular among the general public, which had previously used Chinese-based characters.

During the French protectorate (1883–1945), colonial rulers made an effort to educate all Vietnamese, and a simpler writing system was found more expedient for teaching and communication with the general population. It was not until the beginning of the 20th century that the romanized script came to predominate written communication. To further the process, Vietnamese written with the alphabet was made obligatory for all public documents in 1910 by issue of a decree by the French Résident Supérieur of the protectorate of Tonkin in northern Vietnam.

== 20th century ==
=== Albanian ===
Albanian had used a variety of writing systems since its first attestation in the 12th century, especially Latin (in the north), Greek (in the south), Ottoman and Arabic (favoured by many Muslims). There were attempts at standardisation throughout the 19th century, from 1879 led by the Society for the Publication of Albanian Writings, culminating in the 1908 Congress of Manastir when a single Latin script, Bashkimi, was chosen for the whole language. Although the newly adopted Albanian Latin alphabet symbolised a break with Ottoman rule, some Islamist Kosovo Albanians objected strongly against it, preferring to maintain the Arabic script that was found in the Quran, which they held sacred. However, nationalists maintained that the Latin alphabet was 'above religion' and therefore also acceptable to non-Islamic and secular Albanians; and they won the argument.

=== China ===
After the establishment of the People's Republic of China in 1949, Mao Zedong initially considered Latinizing written Chinese, but during his first official visit to the Soviet Union in that year Joseph Stalin, who stopped the Latinizing of all languages in the Soviet Union in 1930, convinced Mao to maintain the existing Chinese writing system. Instead Zhou Youguang created the pinyin system and Chinese characters were simplified.

As a remnant of the romanization era, for official writing of the Zhuang language the Latin alphabet was chosen over some form of standardised centuries-old Sawndip script based on Chinese characters. The practical consequences of this are limited though, since most Zhuang speakers still use Sawndip.

The Uyghur language in China used a Latin-derived alphabet created upon Pinyin spelling conventions, but it was abolished in 1982 and the Arabic script was restored.

=== Serbo-Croatian ===
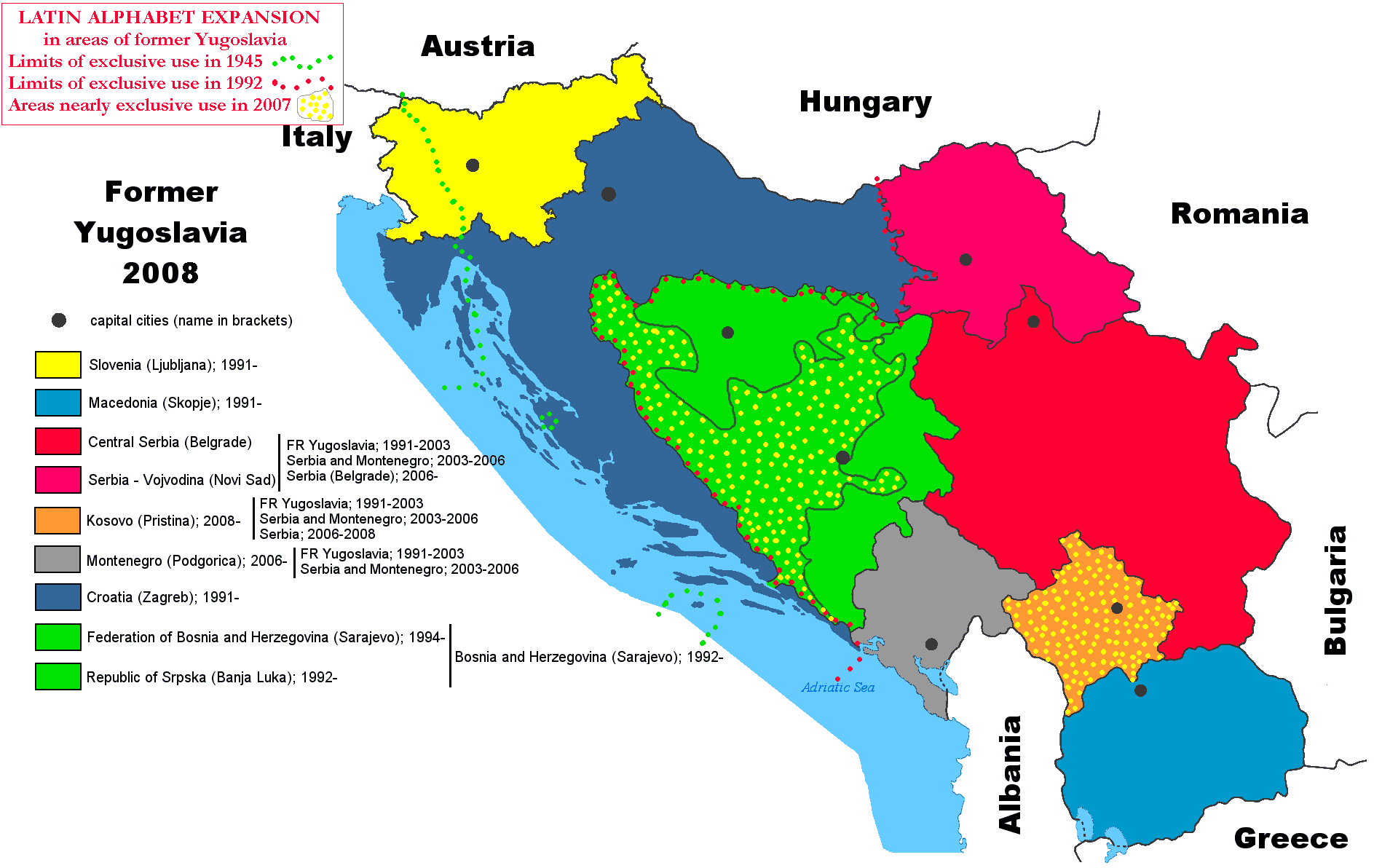
A map showing the expansion of the use of Latin script in areas of former Yugoslavia, primarily amongst Croatians and Slovenes (Roman Catholics), Bosniaks (Bosnian Muslims) and Kosovars (Albanian Muslims). Cyrillic texts are dominant in areas primarily inhabited by Serbs, Montenegrins, and Macedonians (Eastern Orthodox Christians). This cultural boundary has existed since the dichotomy of the Greek East and Latin West.

Croatian linguist Ljudevit Gaj devised a uniform Latin alphabet for Croatian in 1835, while in 1818, Serbian linguist Vuk Karadžić had developed a Serbian Cyrillic alphabet. In the first half of the 19th century, the Illyrian movement to unite all Southern Slavs (Yugoslavs) culturally, and perhaps also politically, was quite strong, and efforts were made to create a unified literary language that would set the standard for all Yugoslav dialects. The Vienna Literary Agreement (March 1850) between writers from Croatia, Serbia and one from Slovenia was the most significant attempt, where some basic rules were agreed upon. In the 1860s, Vuk's orthography gained acceptance in Serbia, while a Yugoslav Academy of Sciences and Arts was founded in 1866 in Zagreb and the first 'Serbo-Croatian' grammar book by Pero Budmani was published in Croatia in 1867. In 1913, Jovan Skerlić proposed a compromise for a single writing system and dialect to create true language unity. After World War I, political unity was realised in the Kingdom of Yugoslavia, but an agreement on scriptural unity for its population was never reached. The post-war Titoist Federal People's Republic of Yugoslavia made another attempt at achieving linguistic unity, but the 1954 Novi Sad Agreement only managed to get equality of Latin and Cyrillic, and an obligation for all citizens to learn both alphabets. With the return of ethnic nationalism in the 1980s, the two again became heavily associated with particular variants of the Serbo-Croatian language and thus with national identities. Exacerbated by the Yugoslav Wars that led to the disintegration of Yugoslavia in the 1990s, nationalists on all sides resumed insisting Croatian, Bosnian, Serbian and Montenegrin were distinct languages in their own right, undermining the project of Serbo-Croatian linguistic unity.

The Bosnian language was originally primarily expressed in the Cyrillic-type Bosančica since the 11th century (originally alongside the older Glagoljica), but it was gradually driven extinct in the 18th century after the Ottoman introduction of the Perso-Arabic script-type Arebica (15th–20th century). Eventually, most Bosnians adopted the Croatian-derived Latinica or Latin script –originally introduced by the Catholic Franciscans– in the course of the 20th century, standardised in the 1990s.

=== Middle East and North Africa ===
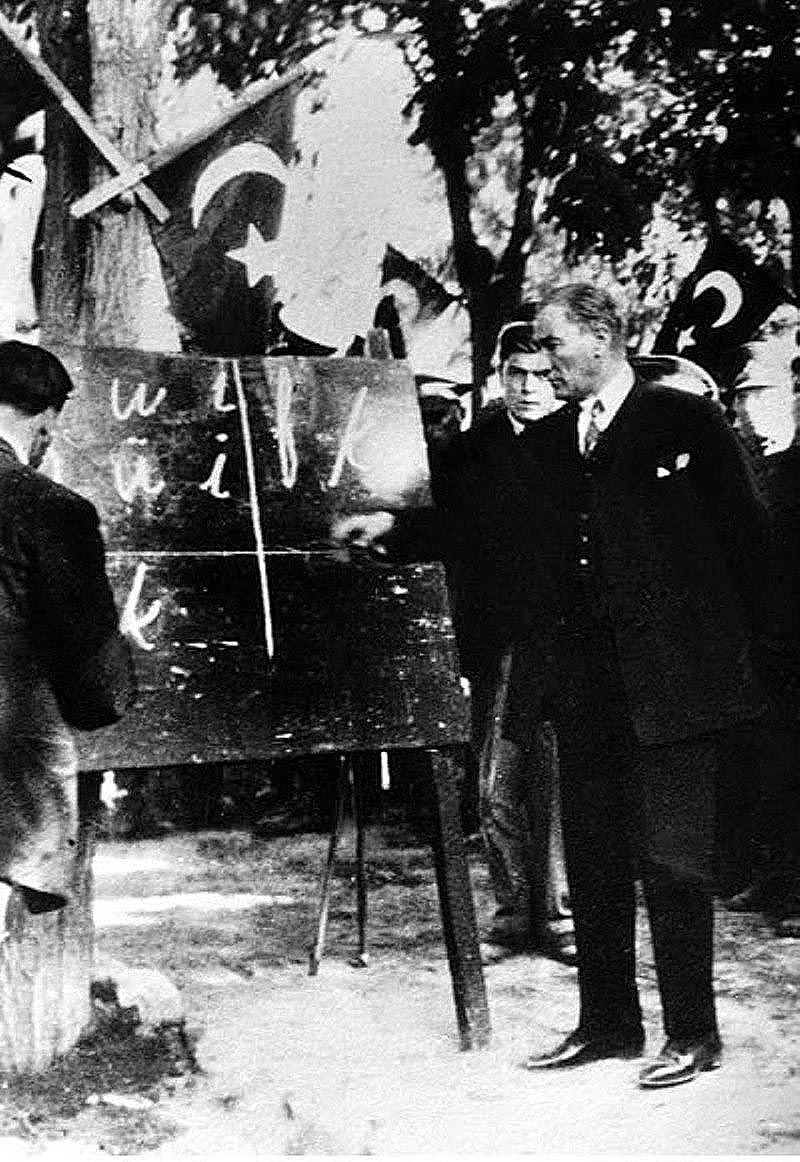
Mustafa Kemal Atatürk introduced the Latin script in Turkey in 1928.

In 1928, as part of Mustafa Kemal Atatürk's reforms, the new Republic of Turkey adopted the Turkish Latin alphabet for the Turkish language, replacing a modified Arabic script.

In the 1930s and 1940s, the majority of Kurds replaced the Arabic script with two Latin alphabets. Although the only official Kurdish government, the Kurdistan Regional Government in northern Iraq, uses an Arabic script for public documents, the Latin Kurdish alphabet remains widely used throughout the region by the majority of Kurdish speakers, especially in Turkey and Syria.

During the late 20th century decolonisation, Pan-Arabism and Arab nationalism expressed themselves in anti-Western tendencies, including hostility towards the Latin script. It was banned in some places such as Libya after Moammar Gaddafi's 1969 coup, in favour of exclusive Arabic script.

=== Soviet Union ===
Since at least 1700, some Russian intellectuals have sought to Latinise the Russian language in their desire for close relations with the West. The Bolsheviks had four goals: to break with Tsarism, to spread socialism to the whole world, to isolate the Muslim inhabitants of the Soviet Union from the Arabic-Islamic world and religion, and eradicate illiteracy through simplification. They concluded the Latin alphabet was the right tool to do so, and after seizing power during the Russian Revolution of 1917, they made plans to realise these ideals.

Although progress was slow at first, in 1926 the Turkic-majority republics of the Soviet Union adopted the Latin script, giving a major boost to reformers in neighbouring Turkey. When Mustafa Kemal Atatürk adopted the new Turkish Latin alphabet in 1928, this in turn encouraged the Soviet leaders to proceed. The commission to romanise the Russian alphabet completed its work in mid-January 1930. But on 25 January 1930, General Secretary Joseph Stalin ordered the stop of the romanisation of Russian. The Latinisation of non-Slavic languages within the USSR continued until the late 1930s, however. Most of the Turkic-speaking peoples of the Soviet Union, including Tatars, Bashkirs, Azerbaijani or Azeri, Kazakh (1929–40), Kyrgyz and others, used the Latin-based Uniform Turkic alphabet in the 1930s; but, in the 1940s, all were replaced by Cyrillic.

=== Post-Soviet states ===
The Russian conquest of Transcaucasia in the 19th century split the Azerbaijani language community across two states, the other being Iran. The Soviet Union promoted development of the language, but set it back considerably with two successive script changes – from the Persian to Latin and then to the Cyrillic script – while Iranian Azerbaijanis continued to use the Persian as they always had. Despite the wide use of Azerbaijani in the Azerbaijan Soviet Socialist Republic, it did not become the official language of Azerbaijan until 1956. After achieving independence from the Soviet Union 1991, the new Republic of Azerbaijan decided to switch back to the Latin script.

Two other newly independent Turkic-speaking republics, Uzbekistan, and Turkmenistan, as well as Romanian-speaking Moldova on 31 August 1989, officially adopted Latin alphabets for their languages. In 1995, Uzbekistan ordered the Uzbek alphabet changed from a Russian-based Cyrillic script to a modified Latin alphabet, and in 1997, Uzbek became the sole language of state administration. However, the government's implementation of the transition to Latin has been rather slow, suffered several setbacks and as of 2017 has not yet been completed. In 2021, the country expressed its ambition to complete the transition process by 2023.

Kazakhstan, Kyrgyzstan, Iranian-speaking Tajikistan, and the breakaway region of Transnistria kept the Cyrillic alphabet, chiefly due to their close ties with Russia. Kazakhstan, however, planned to start a transition process to the Latin alphabet in 2023.

=== Turkmenistan ===
The Turkmen Soviet Socialist Republic employed a Latin alphabet from 1928 to 1940, when it was decreed that all languages in the Soviet Union be written in Cyrillic. After gaining independence in 1991, Turkmenistan was amongst several ex-Soviet states seeking to reintroduce the Latin script. Although totalitarian dictator Saparmurat Niyazov, ruling Turkmenistan from 1985 to his death in 2006, announced a decree on 12 April 1993 that formalised a new Turkmen Latin alphabet, the de facto implementation has been slow and incomplete. The original 1993 alphabet had 30 letters, but missed several sounds and did not fit the Turkmen language, so several amendments were made in 1996. The first book in Latin script was printed in 1995, but Turkmen language and literature manuals were not available until 1999; Cyrillic manuals had been banned before Latin ones were available. Although by 2011 the younger generations were well-versed in the Turkmen Latin alphabet through the education system, adults, including teachers, were not given any official training programme and were expected to learn it by themselves without state support.

== 21st century ==
=== Kazakhstan ===
Unlike its Turkic neighbours, Kazakhstan did not immediately move towards Latinisation after obtaining statehood in 1991. This was motivated by pragmatic reasons: the government was wary to alienate the country's large Russian-speaking minority (who wrote Russian in Cyrillic), and due to the economic crisis in the early 1990s, a transition was considered fiscally unfeasible at the time. It was not until 2017 that Latin became the official script for the Kazakh language in Kazakhstan, replacing Cyrillic.

In 2006, President Nursultan Nazarbayev requested the Ministry of Education and Science to examine the experiences of Turkey, Azerbaijan, Turkmenistan and Uzbekistan, which had all switched to Latin script in the 20th century. The ministry reported in the summer of 2007 that a six-step plan, based primarily on the Uzbekistan model, should be implemented over a 12-to-15-year period at the cost of about $300 million. Aside from integrating Kazakhstan into the global economy, officials have argued it would help the development of a Kazakh national identity separate from Russia. In 2007, Nazarbayev said the transformation of the Kazakh alphabet from Cyrillic to Latin should not be rushed, as he noted: "For 70 years, the Kazakhstanis read and wrote in Cyrillic. More than 100 nationalities live in our state. Thus we need stability and peace. We should be in no hurry in the issue of alphabet transformation".

In 2015, the Kazakh government announced that the Latin script would replace Cyrillic as the writing system for the Kazakh language by 2025. In 2017, Nazarbayev said that "by the end of 2017, after consultation with academics and representatives of the public, a single standard for the new Kazakh alphabet and script should be developed." Education specialists were to be trained to teach the new alphabet and provide textbooks beginning in 2018. The romanisation policy is intended to modernise Kazakhstan and increase international cooperation. On 19 February 2018, president Nazarbayev signed an amendment to the decree of 26 October 2017 No. 569 "On translating the Kazakh alphabet from Cyrillic alphabet to the Latin script." The amended alphabet uses "Sh" and "Ch" for the Kazakh sounds "Ш" and "Ч" and eliminates the use of apostrophes.

=== Canada ===
In October 2019, the organization National Representational Organization for Inuit in Canada (ITK) announced that they will introduce a unified writing system for the Inuit languages in the country. The writing system is based on the Latin alphabet and is modeled after the one used in the Greenlandic language.

=== Oklahoma (United States) ===
From 2006, a new writing system was developed for the Native American Osage language, challenging the dominance of the Latin script for writing that language.

== Debates and proposals ==
Scripts in Europe in the 2010s Latin Cyrillic Latin & Cyrillic Greek Greek & Latin Georgian Armenian

=== Bulgaria ===
In 2001, Austrian slavistics professor Otto Kronsteiner recommended that Bulgaria adopt the Latin script in order to facilitate the country's accession to the European Union. This caused such a scandal that the Veliko Tarnovo University revoked the honorary degree it had previously awarded him (for supporting the Bulgarian viewpoint on the Macedonian language). For many Bulgarians, the Cyrillic alphabet has become an important component of their national identity, and great pride is taken in having introduced Cyrillic into the EU in 2007.

However, in digital communication using computers and writing emails and SMS, the Latin script has been proposed to replace the Cyrillic. A Bulgarian Latin alphabet, the so-called shlyokavitsa (6liokavica), is already often employed for convenience for emails and SMS messages. Ciphers are used to denote Bulgarian sounds that cannot be represented with a single Latin character (for example, a "4" represents a "ч" because they look alike and the Bulgarian word for the cardinal number four, чѐтири čѐtiri, starts with a "ч").

=== Kosovo ===
Despite initial resistance from Islamist Kosovo Albanians (who favoured the Arabic script) against the 1908 Congress of Manastir's resolution to adopt the Latin script to write the Albanian language in, Kosovo Albanians came to accept the Albanian Latin alphabet over the course of the early 20th century. Literacy amongst Kosovo Albanians increased from 26% in 1948 to 96.6% (men) and 87.5% (women) in 2007. The Kosovo Serbs have followed the practice of Cyrillic/Latin digraphia in the Republic of Serbia and continued to use both alphabets after the Kosovo War (1998–99) and the 2008 Kosovo declaration of independence. Article 2 of the 2006 Law on the Use of Languages states that “Albanian and Serbian and their alphabets are official languages of Kosovo and have equal status in Kosovo institutions,” but fails to specify which alphabets these are, as neither Latin nor Cyrillic is mentioned. This has often led the (ethnic Albanian-dominated) Kosovo authorities to exclusively use the Serbo-Croatian Latin alphabet in its communication with the Serb minority, as it does with the country's other five officially recognised minorities, especially the Bosniaks whose language is very similar to Serbian, but more frequently written in Latin. Although Kosovo Serbs may use either or both alphabets in everyday life, some claim they have the right to demand the authorities to communicate with them in their preferred alphabet, and accuse the government of violating the law. The present attitudes of the Kosovar authorities have raised concerns over the Latinisation of the Kosovo Serbs against their will, while the government maintains it respects the legal rights of minorities.

=== Kyrgyzstan ===
Adopting the Latin script for the Kyrgyz language has been the subject of discussions in Kyrgyzstan since attaining independence in the 1990s. However, unlike in the other Turkic-dominated former Soviet republics in Central Asia, the issue did not become prominent until its great neighbour Kazakhstan in September 2015 and April 2017 confirmed its previous announcements to Latinise the closely related Kazakh language. Before then, the largely Russian-speaking elite of the country saw no reason to, nor did it seek to endanger its good-standing political and economic relations with the Russian Federation. Amongst others, deputy Kanybek Imanaliyev advocated a shift to Latin for 'the development of contemporary technology, communication, education and science.' On the other hand, due to financial constraints, he proposed to postpone the transition to the 2030s or even 2040s. Because Russia is still a very important financial supporter of Kyrgyzstan, other experts agreed it would be unwise for Bishkek to make a move that would culturally alienate Moscow. President Almazbek Atambayev stated in October 2017 that the country would not Latinise any time soon. In 2019, the then-Minister of Education and Science Kanybek Isakov expressed support for a switch to the Latin alphabet, which restarted a public debate about the benefits and drawbacks of such a change.

=== Uyghur ===
In western China, an auxiliary alphabet based on the Latin script was developed in 2006 for the Uyghur language, spoken mainly by the Uyghur people.

=== North Macedonia ===
The Macedonian language in its Cyrillic alphabet has been the official language of the Republic of Macedonia throughout the country and in its foreign relations since 1991. However, since the 2001 Albanian insurgency was ended by the Ohrid Agreement, the Constitution of Macedonia has been amended (Amendment V) to mandate the co-official use of the six minority languages and their respective alphabets in municipalities in which more than 20% of an ethnic minority resides. The six minority languages – Albanian, Turkish, Romani, Serbian, Bosnian and Aromanian – are (with the exception of Serbian) always officially written in Latin script in the municipalities where their speakers constitute a significant minority or even majority. In addition, Macedonian is occasionally written in Latin, especially in advertising.

=== Montenegro ===
There is ongoing discussion in Montenegro about how to label the majority language of Montenegro, which is mutually intelligible with the other standardised versions of Serbo-Croatian: Serbian, Croatian and Bosnian. These debates focus on the perceived linguistic differences between Montenegrin and related variants, but also on national and political identification. Montenegro practices digraphia: there are two official Montenegrin alphabets, one Latin and one Cyrillic. In electoral campaigns after 2000, especially the 2006 independence referendum, Latin has come to symbolise closeness to Western countries, including Montenegro's historical ties to Venice, and independence from Serbia; on the other hand, Cyrillic is taken to signify unity with Serbia and closeness to the East.

In general, proponents of calling the language "Montenegrin" – including the DPS-led governments (1990–2020) – tend to favour the Latin script, whereas supporters of "Serbian" prefer Cyrillic. In June 2016, an incident in which top students in primary and secondary schools for the first time since World War II received their "Luca" diplomas – named after Njegoš's poem – printed in the Latin alphabet, sparked political controversy. The opposition Socialist People's Party (SNP) accused Education Minister Predrag Bošković of "persecuting Cyrillic" and discriminating against pupils who use this script. The SNP was unsuccessful in forcing the minister to resign. The annual June reception of Latin-printed pupil's diplomas in schools continued to cause pro-Serbian organisations including new small opposition party True Montenegro to claim Cyrillic users were being 'discriminated' against, while Education Minister Damir Šehović stated that schools are obliged to issue Cyrillic diplomas, but only at the request of pupils’ parents.

=== Serbia ===
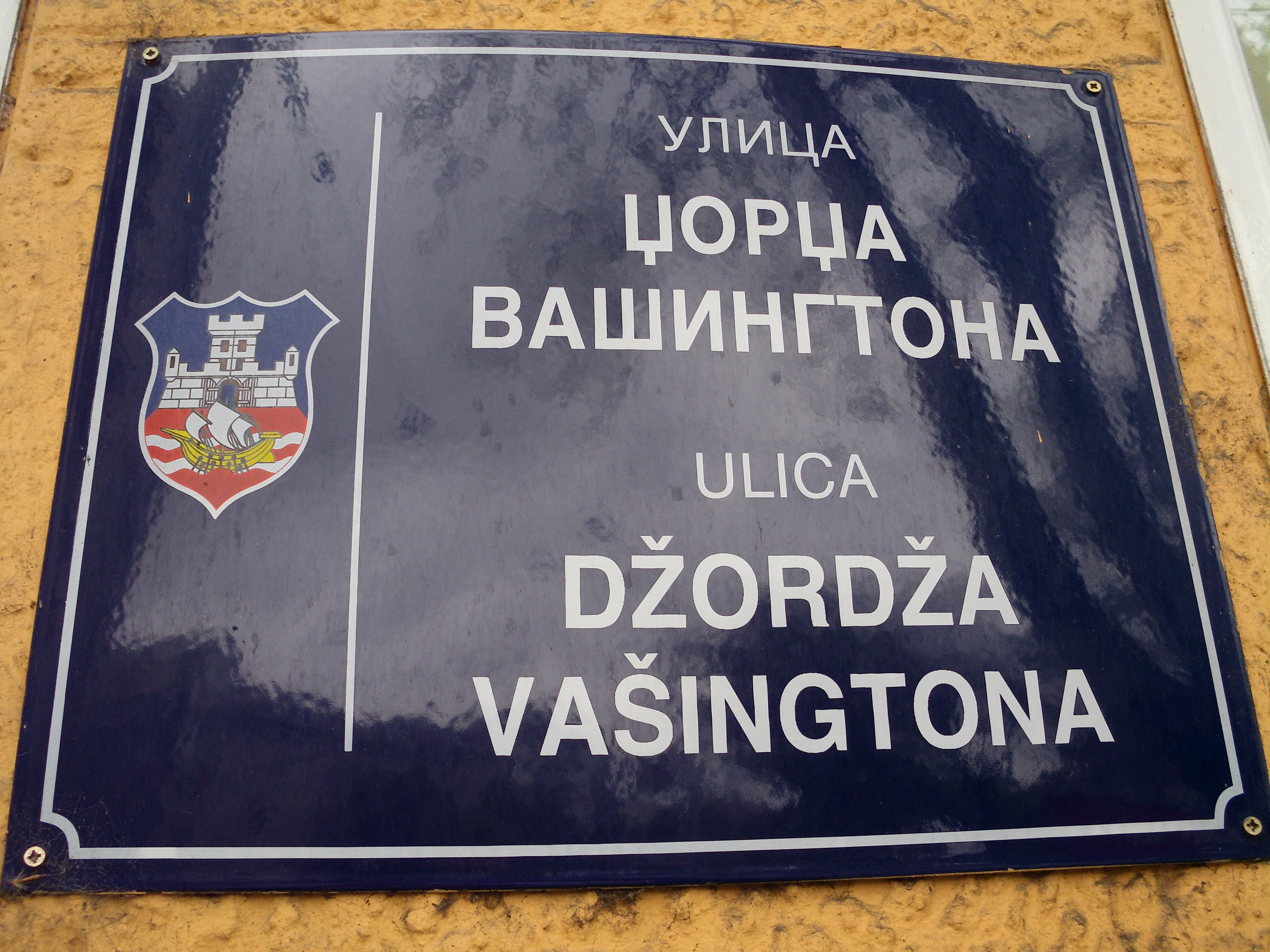
Digraphic 'George Washington Street' sign in Belgrade (2014)

Under the Constitution of Serbia of 2006, Cyrillic script is the only one in official use. Nonetheless, the Latin script is widely used. In May 2017, Minister of Culture and Information Vladan Vukosavljević proposed several measures to better support the Cyrillic script, which was "in danger of falling into disuse". He said there was not any kind of conspiracy going on against the Cyrillic alphabet, but rather that the spirit of the times, historical circumstances and the decades-long process of globalisation had gradually made Latin the world's dominant script. "Especially young people in Serbia are now mostly turning to Latin characters because of the media, the Internet and the logos of world brands." In August 2018, the Ministry of Culture proposed a law to that effect, obliging government institutions to use Cyrillic under the threat of fines, and setting up a Council for the Serbian Language to implement this suggested language policy. The ministry claimed that indifference towards which script to use was not “a culturally responsible position”, and complained that some people had come to “use the Latin script as a symbol of [their] openness and European affiliation”, arguing that Cyrillic was also one of the European Union's official writing systems and that "the EU is a community of peoples with their peculiarities."

=== Tatarstan (Russia) ===
In 1999, the Russian Republic of Tatarstan proposed to convert the Turkic Tatar language to Latin script in order to bring it into the modern world of the Internet. There was opposition from both inside and outside Tatarstan, with Tatars arguing it would threaten their national identity and to sever their ties to the past. The Russian State Duma rejected the proposal. President Vladimir Putin said that a Tatar move from Cyrillic to Latin would 'threaten the unity of the Russian Federation'. In 2002, State Duma enacted a law that made Cyrillic the default script for all languages in all autonomous republics of Russia. Adoption of a different script is possible, but requires a separate law.

On 24 December 2012, a new Tatarstani law clarified that the new Latin alphabet, as specified in 2000, should be used as the official romanization for the Tatar language. It also specified Yaña imlâ as the official system for transliteration into the Arabic script. According to this law, requests to Tatarstani authorities may use the Latin and Arabic scripts, but the authorities' answers would be written in Cyrillic, with an optional transliteration into the other alphabets. As of 2020, Cyrillic remains the only official script in Tatarstan.

=== Ukraine ===
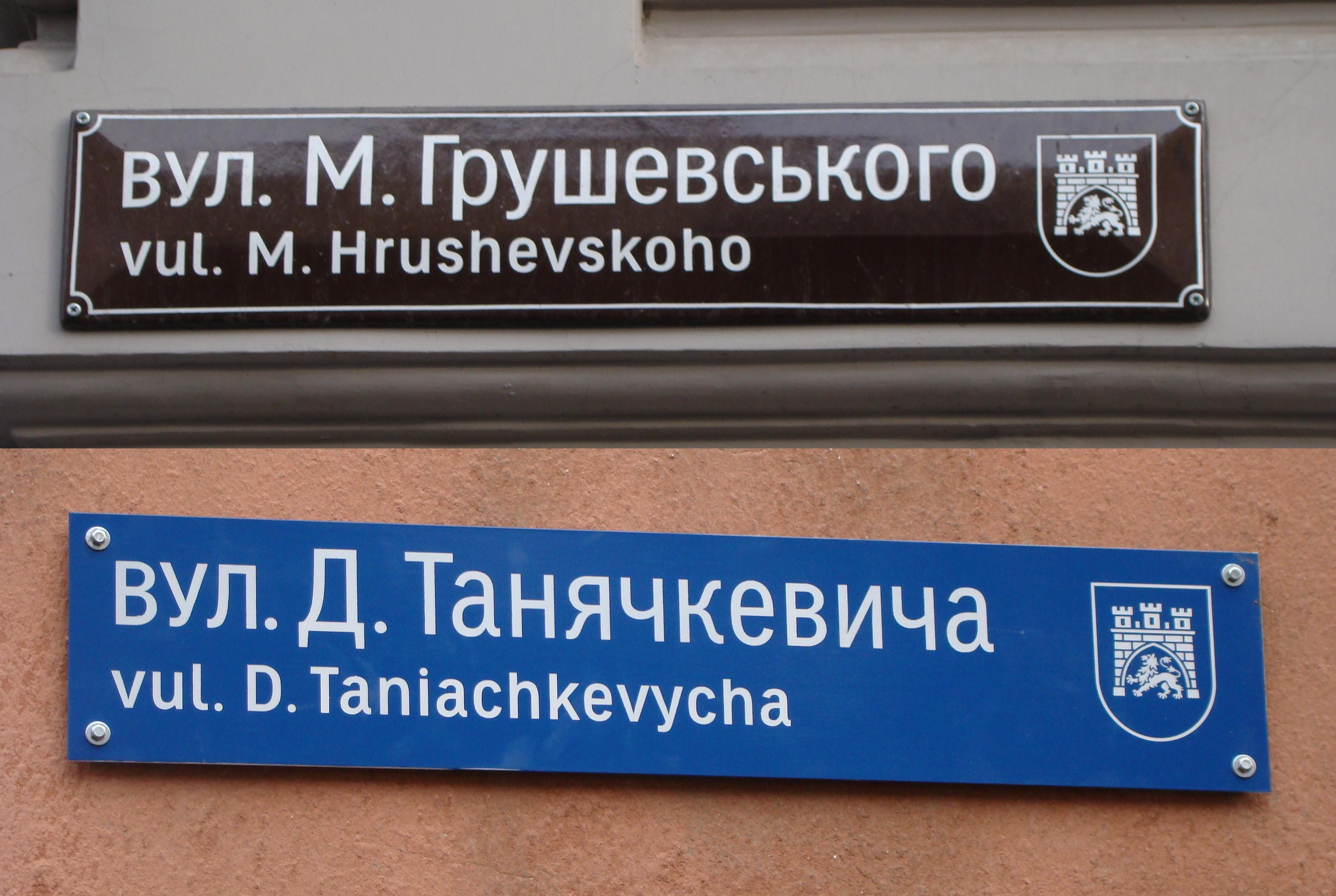
Examples of Lviv street plates written in Cyrillic and governmental standard of latinisation (2012). The upper plate-type above is found in the city centre and the lower one elsewhere.

Ideas about Latinisation of the Ukrainian language can be traced as far back as the 17th century, when Ukrainian lands in the Polish-Lithuanian Commonwealth were under the influence of Polonisation. In the 19th century, the so-called Alphabet War occurred amongst linguists in Austrian Galicia, during which pro-Polish Ukrainophile scholars argued for Latinisation of Ukrainian (then called "Ruthenian"), while anti-Polish Galician Russophiles (or Moscophiles) sought closer cultural attachment to the Russian language and favoured the continued use of Cyrillic. In the 1920s and 1930s, Ukrainian was also part of the Latinisation in the Soviet Union, although this early internationalist Bolshevik policy would be reversed by Joseph Stalin.

In 2014, the city of Lviv in Western Ukraine began promoting transition to the Latin script. In 2017, Kyiv-based journalist Stanislav Rechinsky reinvigorated the topic of Latinisation under the slogan "The more we differ from Russia - the better". In March 2018, Foreign Minister of Ukraine Pavlo Klimkin called for a discussion on the introduction of the Latin alphabet in parallel usage with the traditional Cyrillic one in Ukraine. He did so in response to the suggestion of Polish historian Ziemowit Szczerek. Ukraine's parliamentary committee on science and education responded, with first deputy chair Oleksandr Spivakovsky saying that today in Ukraine there are other, more important issues to work on than a transition to the Latin script. Similarly, philology professor Oleksandr Ponomariv was skeptical whether a full transition to Latin would benefit Ukraine, but did not rule out the parallel use of two alphabets. He pointed to the fact that the Serbian language is also expressed in both a Cyrillic and a Latin alphabet. Ukrainian philologist Oleksandr Polishchuk (2020) said that in the long term, it would be desirable 'to withdraw the Ukrainian language from the Kremlin's cultural space. However, now is not the best time for this.' He pointed to the rapid growth of Ukrainian-language books published in the 2010s, and that a switch to Latin would threaten this nascent and still vulnerable book market, as it 'may take decades for people to get used to the new alphabet.' In 2021, Oleksiy Danilov, the Ukrainian Secretary of the National Security and Defense Council, also called for the country to switch to the Latin alphabet. I.I. Міnkovska (2019) stated: "Currently, in the world there are more than 20 Ukrainian-Latin alphabet transliteration standards that are used to a greater or lesser extent", "but none of them is approved at the Ukrainian official level." She argued that the government-used "Cabinet of Ministers of Ukraine 2010" standard "does not meet the basic principles of transliteration in the best way", and other systems had other flaws.

On 1 April 2022, shortly after the beginning of the ongoing Russian war with Ukraine, the DSTU 9112:2021 "Cyrillic-Latin transliteration and Latin-Cyrillic retransliteration of Ukrainian texts. Writing rules" (ДСТУ 9112:2021) was approved as State Standard of Ukraine. The standard is based on modified ISO 9:1995 standard and was developed by the Technical Committee 144 "Information and Documentation" of the State Scientific and Technical Library of Ukraine. According to the SSTL, it could be used in future cooperation between the European Union and Ukraine, in which "Ukrainian will soon, along with other European languages, take its rightful place in multilingual natural language processing scenarios, including machine translation."

==== Crimean Tatar ====
In September 2021, the Ukrainian Cabinet of Ministers announced that it intends to approve a new alphabet of the Crimean Tatar language which would be based on the Latin script.

== See also ==
- Latinisation of names
- Metrication
- Romanization, conversion of a text in Latin (or Roman) letters
- Spelling reform
