= Ukrainian Latin alphabet =

Latin script versions of the Ukrainian alphabet

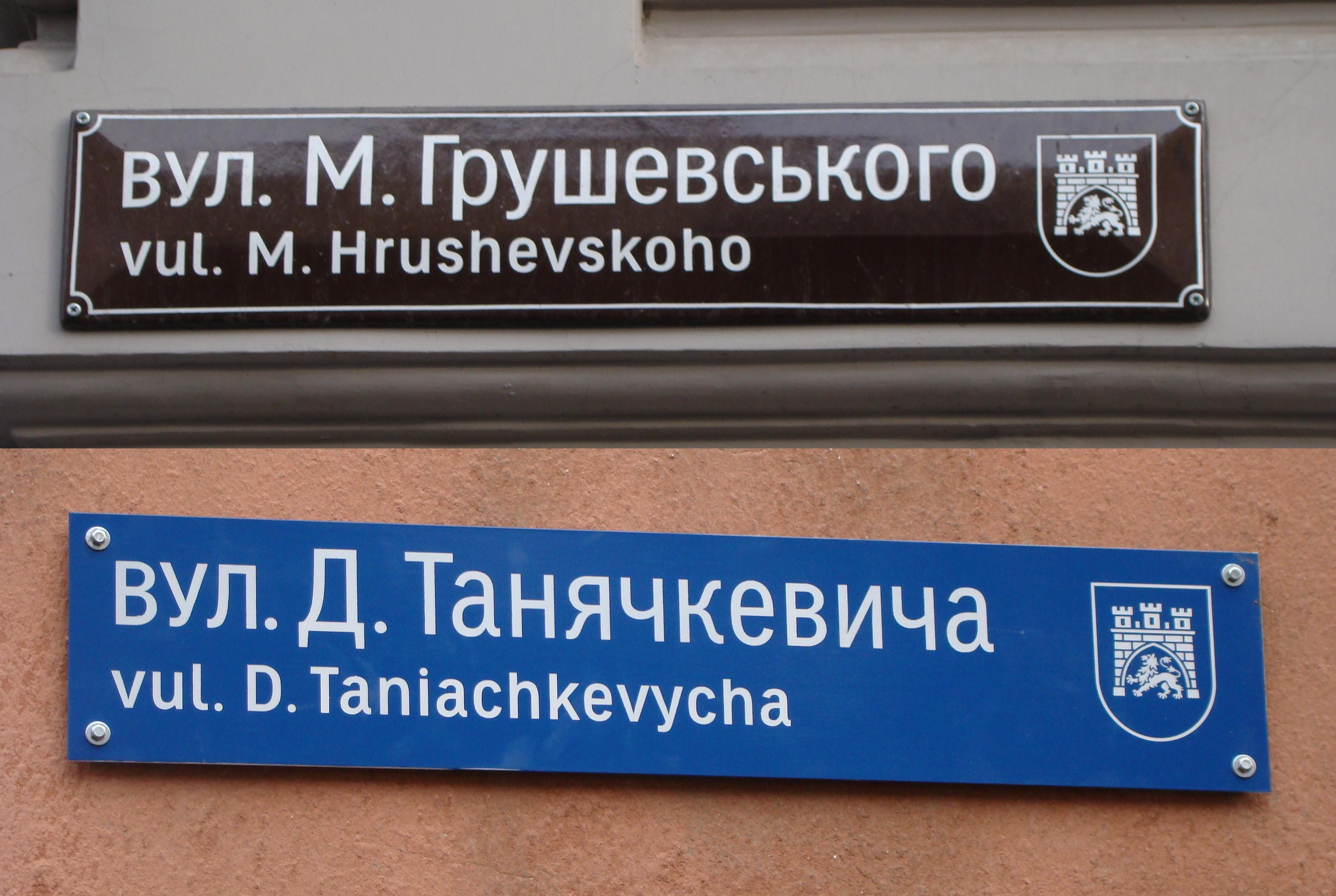
- Examples of Lviv street signs written in Cyrillic and governmental standard of latinisation (2012).
- Script type: Alphabet
- Direction: Left-to-right
- Languages: Ukrainian

Unicode
- Unicode range: Subset of Latin

The Ukrainian Latin alphabet (Note: Ukrainian: Українська латиниця, romanized: Ukrainśka latynycia or Латинка, Latynka) is the form of the Latin script used for writing, transliteration, and retransliteration of Ukrainian.

The Latin alphabet has been proposed or imposed several times in the history in Ukraine, but it has never replaced the dominant Cyrillic Ukrainian alphabet.

== Characteristics ==
Standard Ukrainian has been written with the Cyrillic script in a tradition going back to the introduction of Christianity and Old Church Slavonic to Kievan Rus'. Proposals for Latinization, if not imposed for outright political reasons, have always been politically charged and have never been generally accepted, although some proposals to create an official Latin alphabet for Ukrainian have been expressed lately by national intelligentsia.

While superficially similar to a Latin alphabet, transliteration of Ukrainian from Cyrillic into the Latin script (or romanization) is usually not intended for native speakers, and may be designed for certain academic requirements or technical constraints.

== History ==
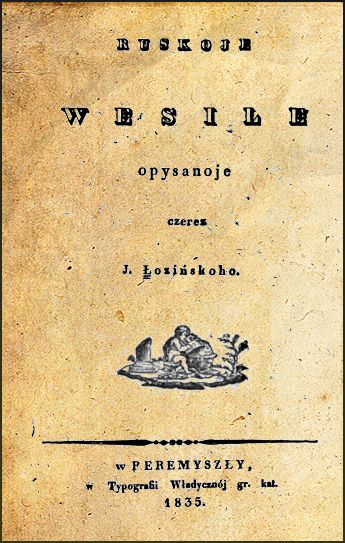
Frontpage of the book "Ruskoje wesile" (Ruthenian wedding, 1835) by Yosyp Lozynskyi which was a presentation of his Latin alphabet for Ruthenian (Ukrainian) language.

=== 19th century ===
In the nineteenth century, there were attempts to introduce the Latin script into Ukrainian writing, by J. Lozinskiy (Polish: Józef Łoziński), a Ukrainian scholar and priest from Lviv (Josyp Łozyński Ivanovyč, Ruskoje wesile, 1834), Tomasz Padura.

The use of the Latin script for Ukrainian was promoted by authorities in Galicia under the Austrian Habsburg Empire. Franz Miklosich developed a Latin alphabet for Ukrainian in 1852, based on the Polish and Czech alphabets (adopting Czech č, š, ž, dž, ď, ť, Polish ś, ź, ć, ń, and ł following the same pattern). Czech politician Josef Jireček took an interest in this concept and managed to gain support for the project in the Imperial Ministry of Interior.

As part of a Polonization campaign in Galicia during the period of neo-absolutist rule after 1849, Viceroy Agenor Gołuchowski attempted to impose this Latin alphabet on Ukrainian publications in 1859. This started a fierce publicly debated Alphabetical War (Ukrainian: Азбучна війна), and in the end the Latin alphabet was rejected.

A Latin alphabet for Ukrainian publications was also imposed in Romanian Bessarabia, Bukovina and Dobrudja, Hungarian Zakarpattia.

In Ukraine under the Russian Empire, Mykhailo Drahomanov promoted a purely phonemic Cyrillic alphabet (the Drahomanivka) including the Latin letter ј in 1876, replacing the digraphs я, є, ю, ї with ја, је, јu, јі, similar to the earlier Karadžić reform of the Serbian alphabet.

=== 20th century ===
In 1922 Ukrainian futurist writer Mykhail Semenko published a magazine called Semafor u Majbutn'e ("Semaphore to the Future"), which included texts in Ukrainian, English, French and German languages, all written in Latin alphabet. One year later, Serhiy Pylypenko published his letter using a version of the Ukrainian Latin alphabet in the magazine Chervonyi Shliakh, an official publication of the People's Commissariat of Education. According to Pylypenko, the unification of alphabets on the base of the Latin script would solve the problem of "international unity". Another supporter of this idea was Ukrainian author and linguist Maik Yohansen.

In 1927 an all-Ukrainian orthographic conference was organized in Kharkiv, then capital of Soviet Ukraine. One of the questions discussed at the conference was the adoption of Latin alphabet for Ukrainian language. However the idea was discarded by a majority vote. The main arguments used by opponents of Latinization at the conference, among them education commissar Mykola Skrypnyk and Lviv professor Kyrylo Studynsky, were the high financial and material costs, as well as possible opposition to that step by Russians and Galician Ukrainians. Instead of a Ukrainian Latin alphabet, a new Cyrillic-based Ukrainian orthography (Skrypnykivka) was officially adopted in 1928.

=== 21st century ===
==== Ukrainian National transliteration ====
This is the official transliteration system of Ukraine, also employed by the United Nations and many countries' foreign services. It is currently widely used to represent Ukrainian geographic names and for personal names in passports. It is based on English orthography, and requires only ASCII characters with no diacritics. It can be considered a variant of the "modified Library of Congress system" but does not simplify the -ий and -ій endings.

The first version of the system was codified in Decision No. 9 of the Ukrainian Committee on Issues of Legal Terminology on 19 April 1996, stating that the system is binding for the transliteration of Ukrainian names in English in legislative and official acts.

The current 2010 version is used for transliterating all proper names was approved as Resolution 55 of the Cabinet of Ministers of Ukraine, on 27 January 2010. This modified earlier laws and brought together a unified system for official documents, publication of cartographic works, signs and indicators of inhabited localities, streets, stops, subway stations, etc.

It has been adopted internationally. The 27th session of the UN Group of Experts on Geographical Names (UNGEGN), held in New York on 30 July and 10 August 2012, approved the Ukrainian system of romanization. The BGN/PCGN jointly adopted the system in 2020.

Official geographic names are romanized directly from the original Ukrainian and not translated. For example, Kyivska oblast not Kyiv Oblast, Pivnichnokrymskyi kanal not North Crimean Canal.

==== DSTU 9112:2021 ====
On 1 April 2022, the "Cyrillic-Latin transliteration and Latin-Cyrillic retransliteration of Ukrainian texts. Writing rules" DSTU 9112:2021 was approved as State Standard of Ukraine. The standard is based on modified ISO 9:1995 standard and was developed by the Technical Committee 144 "Information and Documentation" of the State Scientific and Technical Library of Ukraine. According to the SSTL, it could be used in future cooperation between the European Union and Ukraine, in which "Ukrainian will soon, along with other European languages, take its rightful place in multilingual natural language processing scenarios, including machine translation."

== Variations ==
=== Abecadło ===
Some letters borrowed from Polish were used in the Ukrainian Łatynka as stated above, which also has a close resemblance to the Belarusian Łacinka. Although never broadly accepted, it was used mostly by Ukrainians living in territories near Poland (where it was called Abecadło).

The Ukrainian Latin alphabet: Abecadło (a western Ukrainian publication, c. 1900s)
A a	B b	C c	Ć ć	Cz cz	Ch ch	D d	D́ d́	E e
А а	Б б	Ц ц	Ць ць	Ч ч	Х х	Д д	Дь дь	Е е
F f	G g	H h	I i	J j	K k	L l	Ł ł	M m
Ф ф	Ґ ґ	Г г	І і	Й й	К к	Ль ль	Л л	М м
N n	Ń ń	O o	P p	R r	Ŕ ŕ	S s	Ś ś	Sz sz
Н н	Нь нь	О о	П п	Р р	Рь рь	С с	Сь сь	Ш ш
Szcz szcz	T t	T́ t́	U u	W w	Y y	Z z	Ź ź	Ż ż
Щ щ	Т т	Ть ть	У у	В в	И и	З з	Зь зь	Ж ж

As example, the Introduction of Josyp Łozynśkyj's Ruskoje Wesile ('Ruthenian Wedding', 1834):

Perédmowa
W tym opysi skazuju, jaksia wesile po sełach meży prostym ruskim ludom widprawlaje. Ne mohu jednako utrymowaty, jakoby toj sposób wesile widprawlaty wsiude newidminni był zachowanym; bo hdenekodyj szczoś dodajut, hdeinde szczoś wypuskajut, a znowu hdeinde szczoś widminiajut. Syła w mojej syli było, starał-jemsia w rozmaitych misciach obradki i pisny ruskoho wesila póznaty i pérekonał-jemsia że prynajmni szczo do hołownych obradkiw i pisnéj wsiude tymże samym sposobom wesilesia widprawlaje. I toj sposób opysałjem w nynijszуj knyżoczci dodajuczy jednako hdenekodyj i miscowyi widminy. Moim najperszym i najbohatszym a nawet́ i nihdy newyczerpanym źridłom, z kotorohom tyi widomosty czerpał, było dopytowanie po sełach tych ludej, kotryi czasto na wesilach bywały i wesilnyi uŕady pistowały. Nykotorych obradkiw był jem sam okozritelnym świdkom.

=== Jireček's project ===
Josef Jireček proposed an alphabet based more closely on Czech orthography (except some letters like ć, ń, ś, ź).

Jireček's project
A a	B b	C c	Ć ć	Č č	Ch ch	D d	Ď ď	Dz dz
А а	Б б	Ц ц	Ць ць	Ч ч	Х х	Д д	Дь дь	Дз дз
Dź dź	Dž dž	E e	Ě ě	F f	G g	H h	I i	J j
Дзь дзь	Дж дж	Е е	Є є^{1}	Ф ф	Ґ ґ	Г г	І і	(Й) (й)
K k	L l	Ľ ľ	Ł ł	M m	N n	Ń ń	O o	P p
К к	Л л	Л(ь) л(ь)	Л л^{2}	М м	Н н	Нь нь	О о	П п
Q q	R r	Ŕ ŕ	S s	Ś ś	Š š	Šč šč	T t	Ť ť
Кв кв^{4}	Р р	Рь рь	С с	Сь сь	Ш ш	Щ щ	Т т	Ть ть
U u	Ü ü	V v	W w	X x	Y y	Z z	Ź ź	Ž ž
У у	І і^{3}	В в	В в^{4}	Кс кс^{4}	И и	З з	Зь зь	Ж ж

1. For є which is used in place of Old Church Slavonic ѧ or Polish ę (e.g. sěhnuty, děkovaly, ščěstje, devěť).
2. For л in old Slavic ъl + cons. (e.g. vołk). Jireček mistakenly believed there are three types of L in Ukrainian – hard (hart) l, soft (erweicht) ľ and potentiated hard (potenziert hart) ł.
3. For і, which derives from Old Church Slavonic о (as Jireček distinguished і < о and і < е, ѣ; e.g. кість - küsť, гвіздь - hvüźď).
4. In foreign words only.

=== Comparison ===
Comparison of several romanization systems for Ukrainian and historical versions of Ukrainian Latin alphabet in example of the State Anthem of Ukraine.

==== Official Ukrainian romanization systems ====
Cyrillic	Ukrainian National System (KMU Resolution 55) BGN/PCGN 2019 Agreement	DSTU 9112:2021, System A	DSTU 9112:2021, System B
Ще не вмерла України і слава, і воля, Ще нам, браття молодії, усміхнеться доля. Згинуть наші воріженьки, як роса на сонці. Запануєм і ми, браття, у своїй сторонці. Приспів: Душу й тіло ми положим за нашу свободу, І покажем, що ми, браття, козацького роду.	Shche ne vmerla Ukrainy i slava, i volia. Shche nam, brattia molodii, usmikhnetsia dolia. Zghynut nashi vorizhenky, yak rosa na sontsi, Zapanuiem i my, brattia, u svoii storontsi. Pryspiv: Dushu y tilo my polozhym za nashu svobodu, I pokazhem, shcho my, brattia, kozatskoho rodu.	Ŝe ne vmerla Ukraïny i slava, i volja, Ŝe nam, brattja molodiï, usmixnetjsja dolja. Zǧynutj naši voriženjky, jak rosa na sonci. Zapanujem i my, brattja, u svoïj storonci. Pryspiv: Dušu j tilo my položym za našu svobodu, I pokažem, ŝo my, brattja, kozacjkoǧo rodu.	Shche ne vmerla Ukrajiny i slava, i volja, Shche nam, brattja molodiji, usmikhnetjsja dolja. Zghynutj nashi vorizhenjku, jak rosa na sonci. Zapanujem i my, brattja, u svojij storonci. Pryspiv: Dushu j tilo my polozhym za nashu svobodu, I pokazhem, shcho my, brattja, kozacjkogho rodu.

==== Non-Ukrainian romanization systems ====
ISO 9:1995	Library of Congress (ALA-LC)	BGN/PCGN 1965 (Obsolete)
Ŝe ne vmerla Ukraïni ì slava, ì volâ, Ŝe nam, brattâ molodìï, usmìhnet'sâ dolâ. Zginut' našì vorìžen'ki, âk rosa na soncì. Zapanuêm ì mi, brattâ, u svoïj storoncì. Prispìv: Dušu j tìlo mi položim za našu svobodu, Ì pokažem, ŝo mi, brattâ, kozac'kogo rodu.	Shche ne vmerla Ukraïny i slava, i voli͡a. Shche nam, bratti͡a molodiï, usmikhnet'si͡a doli͡a. Zhynut' nashi vorizhen'ky, i͡ak rosa na sont͡si, Zapanui͡em i my, bratti͡a, u svoïĭ storont͡si. Pryspiv: Dushu ĭ tilo my poloz͡hym za nashu svobodu, I pokaz͡hem, shcho my, bratti͡a, kozat͡s'koho rodu.	Shche ne vmerla Ukrayiny i slava, i volya. Shche nam, brattya molodiyi, usmikhnet'sya dolya. Z·hynut' nashi vorizhen'ky, yak rosa na sontsi, Zapanuyem i my, brattya, u svoyiy storontsi. Pryspiv: Dushu y tilo my polozhym za nashu svobodu, I pokazhem, shcho my, brattya, kozats'koho rodu.

==== Historical Latin Alphabets ====
Łozynśkyj's	Jireček's	Gajica based
Szcze ne wmerła Ukrainy i sława, i wola. Szcze nam, brattia molodii, usmichneťsia dola. Zhynuť naszi woriżeńky, jak rosa na sonci, Zapanujem i my, brattia, u swoij storonci. Pryspiw: Duszu j tiło my położym za naszu swobodu, I pokażem, szczo my, brattia, kozaćkoho rodu.	Šče ne vmerla Ukrajiny i slava, i voľa. Šče nam, bratťa molodiji, usmichnet sě doľa. Zhynut naši vorüžeńky, jak rosa na sonci, Zapanujem i my, bratťa, u svojij storonci. Pryspiv: Dušu j tilo my položym za našu svobodu, I pokažem, ščo my, bratťa, kozaćkoho rodu.	Šče ne vmerla Ukrajiny i slava, i volja. Šče nam, brattja molodiji, usmihnetjsja dolja. Zhynutj naši voriženjky, jak rosa na sonci, Zapanujem i my, brattja, u svojij storonci. Pryspiv: Dušu j tilo my položym za našu svobodu, I pokažem, ščo my, brattja, kozacjkoho rodu.

== Gallery ==
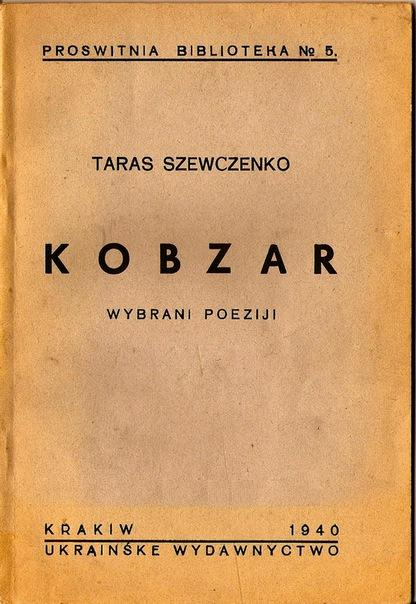
"Kobzar" by Taras Shevchenko, published in 1940 (abecadło)

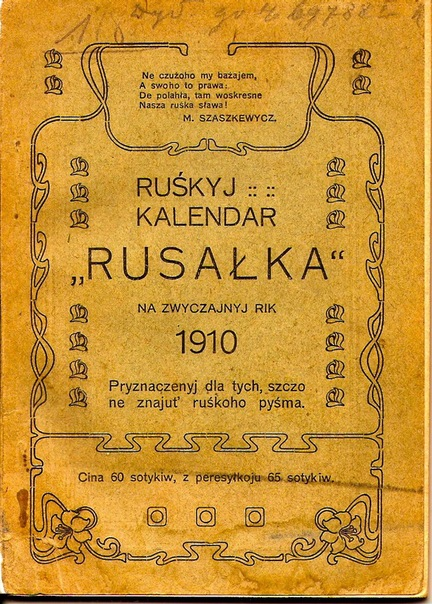
"Ruthenian Calendar" for those who did not understand Cyrillic, 1910 (abecadło)

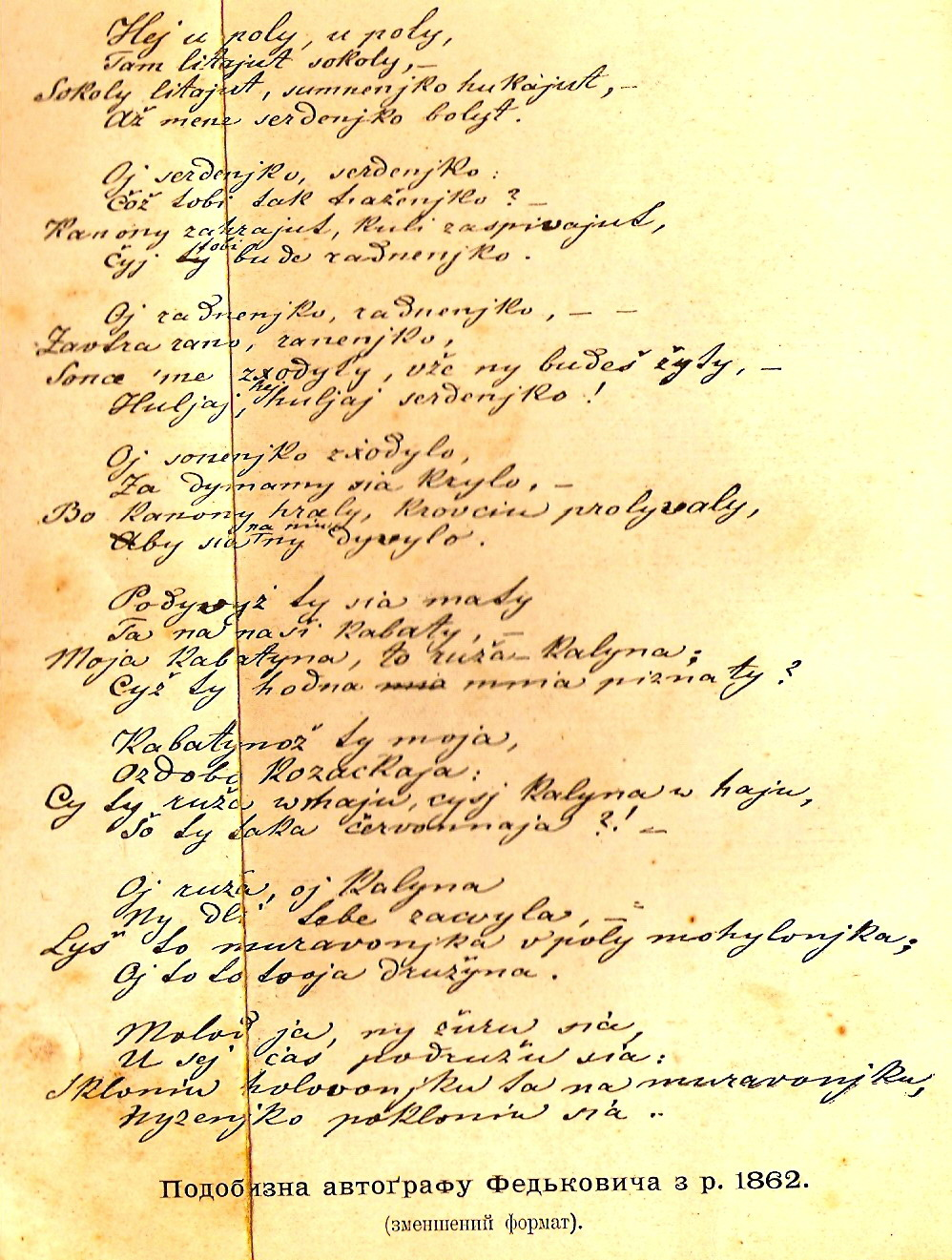
Authograph of a poem by Yuriy Fedkovych (gajica and abecadło)

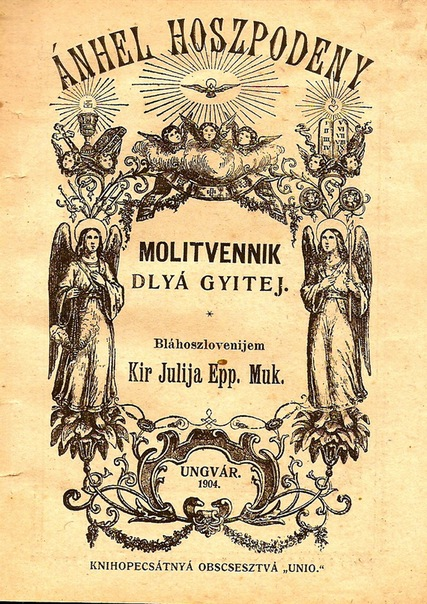
A prayer book for children published in Carpathian Ruthenia, 1904 (Hungarian-based transliteration)

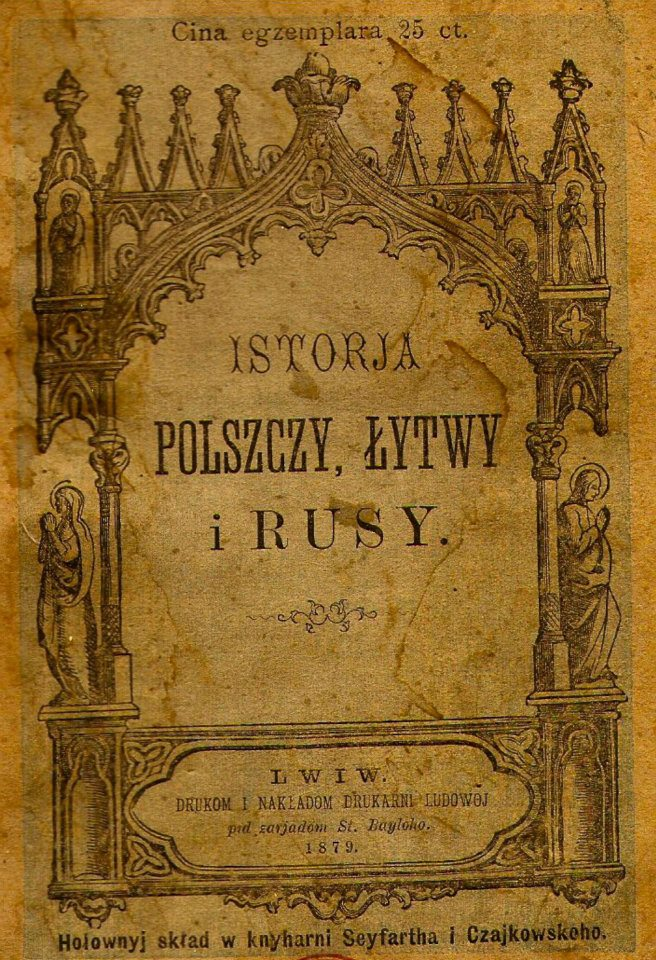
History of Poland, Lithuania and Ruthenia, 1879 (abecadło)

== See also ==
- Romanization of Ukrainian
- Belarusian Latin alphabet
- Russian Latin alphabet
- Latinisation (USSR)
- Polish orthography
- Czech orthography
- Slovak orthography
- Gaj's Latin alphabet
