= Romanization of Ukrainian =

Representation of the Ukrainian language using Latin letters

The romanization of Ukrainian is the representation of the Ukrainian language in the Latin alphabet. Ukrainian is written in its own alphabet, which is based on the Cyrillic script. Romanization may be employed to represent Ukrainian text or pronunciation for non-Ukrainian readers, on computer systems that cannot reproduce Cyrillic characters, or for typists who are not familiar with the Ukrainian keyboard layout. Methods of romanization include transliteration (representing written text) and transcription (representing the spoken word).

In contrast to romanization, there have been several historical proposals for a Ukrainian Latin alphabet, usually based on those used by West Slavic languages, but none have been widely accepted.

== Romanization systems ==
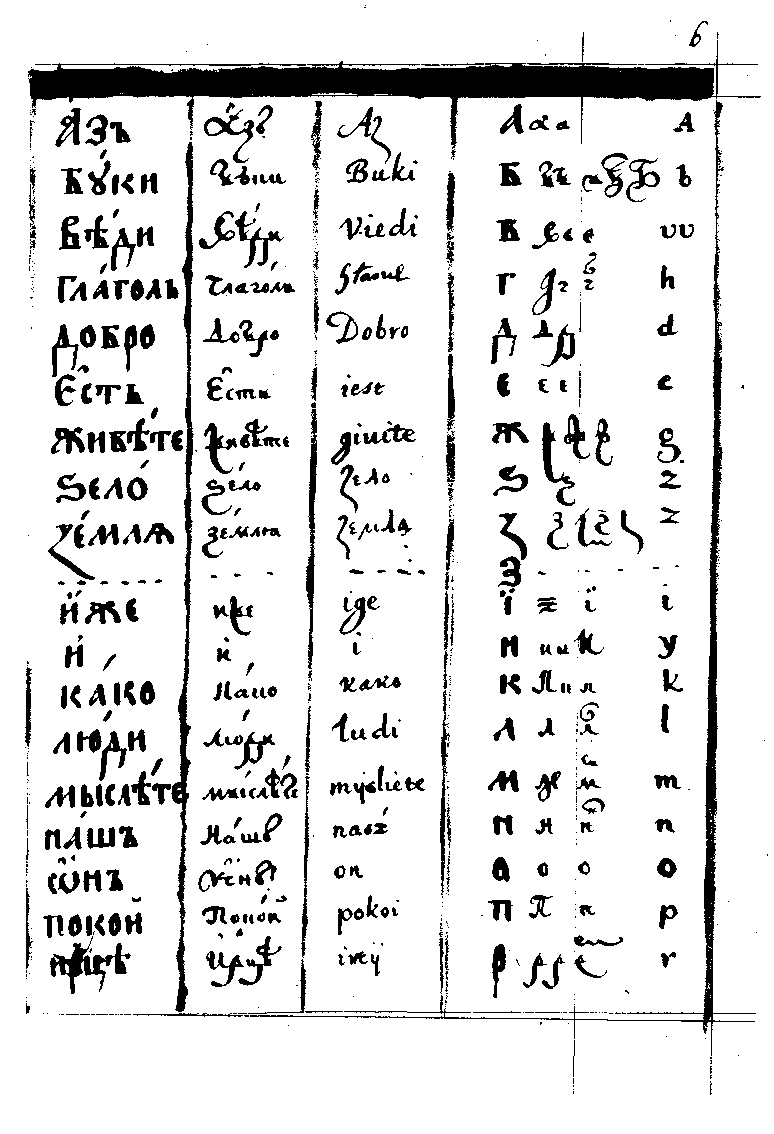
Part of a table of letters of the alphabet for the Ruthenian language, from Ivan Uzhevych's Hrammatyka Slovenskaja (1645). Columns show the letter names printed, in manuscript Cyrillic and Latin, common Cyrillic letterforms, and the Latin transliteration. (Part 2 and part 3.)

=== Transliteration ===
Transliteration is the letter-for-letter representation of text using another writing system. Rudnyckyj classified transliteration systems into scientific transliteration, used in academic and especially linguistic works, and practical systems, used in administration, journalism, in the postal system, in schools, etc. Scientific transliteration, also called the scholarly system, is used internationally, with very little variation, while the various practical methods of transliteration are adapted to the orthographical conventions of other languages, like English, French, German, etc.

Depending on the purpose of the transliteration it may be necessary to be able to reconstruct the original text, or it may be preferable to have a transliteration which sounds like the original language when read aloud.

==== Scientific transliteration ====
Scientific transliteration, also called the academic, linguistic, international, or scholarly system, is most often seen in linguistic publications on Slavic languages. It is purely phonemic, meaning each character represents one meaningful unit of sound, and is based on the Croatian Latin alphabet. Different variations are appropriate to represent the phonology of historical Old Ukrainian (mid 11th–14th centuries) and Middle Ukrainian (15th–18th centuries).

A variation was codified in the 1898 Prussian Instructions for libraries, or Preußische Instruktionen (PI), and widely used in bibliographic cataloguing in Central Europe and Scandinavia. With further modifications it was published by the International Organization for Standardization as recommendation ISO/R 9 in 1954, revised in 1968, and again as an international standard in 1986 and 1995.

Representing all of the necessary diacritics on computers requires Unicode, Latin-2, Latin-4, or Latin-7 encoding. Other Slavic based romanizations occasionally seen are those based on the Slovak alphabet or the Polish alphabet, which include symbols for palatalized consonants.

==== Library of Congress system ====
The ALA-LC Romanization Tables were first discussed by the American Library Association in 1885, and published in 1904 and 1908, including rules for romanizing Church Slavic, the pre-reform Russian alphabet, and Serbo-Croatian. Revised tables including Ukrainian were published in 1941, and remain in use virtually unchanged according to the latest 2011 release. This system is used to represent bibliographic information by US and Canadian libraries, by the British Library since 1975, and in North American publications.

In addition to bibliographic cataloguing, simplified versions of the Library of Congress system are widely used for romanization in the text of academic and general publications. For notes or bibliographical references, some publications use a version without ligatures, which offers sufficient precision but simplifies the typesetting burden and easing readability. For specialist audiences or those familiar with Slavic languages, a version without ligatures and diacritical marks is sometimes used. For broader audiences, a "modified Library of Congress system" is employed for personal, organizational, and place names, omitting all ligatures and diacritics, ignoring the soft sign ь (ʹ), with initial Є- (I͡E-), Й- (Ĭ-), Ю- (I͡U-), and Я- (I͡A-) represented by Ye-, Y-, Yu-, and Ya-, surnames' terminal -ий (-yĭ) and -ій (-iĭ) endings simplified to -y, and sometimes with common first names anglicized, for example, Олександр (Oleksandr) written as Alexander.

Typical use	Variation	Example
Original Cyrillic text	–	Ярослав Рудницький
Library catalogue, standalone bibliography	Strict ALA-LC	I͡Aroslav Rudnyt͡sʹkyĭ
Footnote or bibliography	Without ligatures	Iaroslav Rudnytsʹkyĭ
Academic text	Without ligatures or diacritics	Iaroslav Rudnytskyi
Names in general text	Modified Library of Congress	Yaroslav Rudnytsky
Ukrainian National transliteration	Modified BGN/PCGN	Yaroslav Rudnytskyi

Similar principles were systematically described for Russian by J. Thomas Shaw in 1969, and since widely adopted. Their application for Ukrainian and multilingual text were described in the 1984 English translation of Kubiiovych's Encyclopedia of Ukraine and in the 1997 translation of Hrushevskyi's History of Ukraine-Rusʹ, and other sources have referred to these, for example, historian Serhii Plokhy in several works. However, the details of usage vary, for example, the authors of the Historical Dictionary of Ukraine render the soft sign ь before о with an i, "thus Khvyliovy, not Khvylovy, as in the Encyclopedia of Ukraine".

Requires Unicode for connecting diacritics, but only plain ASCII characters for a simplified version.

==== British Standard ====
British Standard 2979:1958 "Transliteration of Cyrillic and Greek Characters", from BSI, is used by the Oxford University Press. A variation is used by the British Museum and British Library, but since 1975 their new acquisitions have been catalogued using Library of Congress transliteration.

In addition to the "British" system, the standard also includes tables for the "International" system for Cyrillic, corresponding to ISO/R 9:1968 (and ISO's recommendation reciprocally has an alternate system corresponding to BSI's). It also includes tables for romanization of Greek.

==== BGN/PCGN ====
BGN/PCGN romanization is a series of standards approved by the United States Board on Geographic Names and Permanent Committee on Geographical Names for British Official Use. Pronunciation is intuitive for English-speakers. For Ukrainian, the former BGN/PCGN system was adopted in 1965, but superseded there by the Ukrainian National System in 2019. A modified version is also mentioned in the Oxford Style Manual.

Requires only ASCII characters if optional separators are not used.

==== GOST (1971, 1983)/Derzhstandart (1995, 2021) ====
The Soviet Union's GOST, COMECON's SEV, and Ukraine's Derzhstandart are government standards bodies of the former Eurasian communist countries. They published a series of romanization systems for Ukrainian, which were replaced by ISO 9:1995. For details, see GOST 16876-71.

==== DSTU 9112:2021 ====
On 1 April 2022, the "Cyrillic-Latin transliteration and Latin-Cyrillic retransliteration of Ukrainian texts. Writing rules" (ДСТУ 9112:2021) was approved as State Standard of Ukraine. The standard is based on modified ISO 9:1995 standard and was developed by the Technical Committee 144 "Information and Documentation" of the State Scientific and Technical Library of Ukraine. According to the SSTL, it could be used in future cooperation between the European Union and Ukraine, in which "Ukrainian will soon, along with other European languages, take its rightful place in multilingual natural language processing scenarios, including machine translation."

The Derzhstandart 1995 system (invented by Maksym Vakulenko) is also mentioned in the DSTU 9112:2021 standard (approved in 2022) as the "B system"; the new standard also includes an "A system" with diacritical marks and some differences from ISO 9:1995: г=ğ, ґ=g, є=je, и=y, і=i, х=x, ь=j, ю=ju, я=ja.

==== ISO 9 ====
ISO 9 is a series of systems from the International Organization for Standardization. The ISO published editions of its "international system" for romanization of Cyrillic as recommendations (ISO/R 9) in 1954 and 1968, and standards (ISO 9) in 1986 and 1995. This was originally derived from scientific transliteration in 1954 and is meant to be usable by readers of most European languages. The 1968 edition also included an alternative system identical to the British Standard.

The 1995 edition supports most national Cyrillic alphabets in a single transliteration table. It is a pure transliteration system, with each Cyrillic character represented by exactly one unique Latin character, making it reliably reversible, but sacrificing readability and adaptation to individual languages. It considers only graphemes and disregards phonemic differences. So, for example, г (Ukrainian He or Russian Ge) is always represented by the transliteration g; ґ (Ukrainian letter Ge) is represented by g̀.

Representing all of the necessary diacritics on computers requires Unicode, and a few characters are rarely present in computer fonts, for example g-grave: g̀.

==== Ukrainian National transliteration ====
This is the official system of Ukraine, also employed by the United Nations and many countries' foreign services. It is currently widely used to represent Ukrainian geographic names, which were almost exclusively romanized from Russian before Ukraine's independence in 1991, and for personal names in passports. It is based on English orthography, and requires only ASCII characters with no diacritics. It can be considered a variant of the "modified Library of Congress system", but does not simplify the -ий and -ій endings.

Its first version was codified in Decision No. 9 of the Ukrainian Committee on Issues of Legal Terminology on April 19, 1996, stating that the system is binding for the transliteration of Ukrainian names in English in legislative and official acts.

A new official system was introduced for transliteration of Ukrainian personal names in Ukrainian passports in 2007.

An updated 2010 version became the system used for transliterating all proper names and was approved as Resolution 55 of the Cabinet of Ministers of Ukraine, January 27, 2010. This modified earlier laws and brought together a unified system for official documents, publication of cartographic works, signs and indicators of inhabited localities, streets, stops, subway stations, etc.

It has been adopted internationally. The 27th session of the UN Group of Experts on Geographical Names (UNGEGN) held in New York 30 July and 10 August 2012 after a report by the State Agency of Land Resources of Ukraine (now known as Derzhheokadastr: Ukraine State Service of Geodesy, Cartography and Cadastre) experts approved the Ukrainian system of romanization. The BGN/PCGN jointly adopted the system in 2019.

Official geographic names are romanized directly from the original Ukrainian and not translated. For example, Kyivska oblast not Kyiv Oblast, Pivnichnokrymskyi kanal not North Crimean Canal.

==== Romanization for other languages than English ====
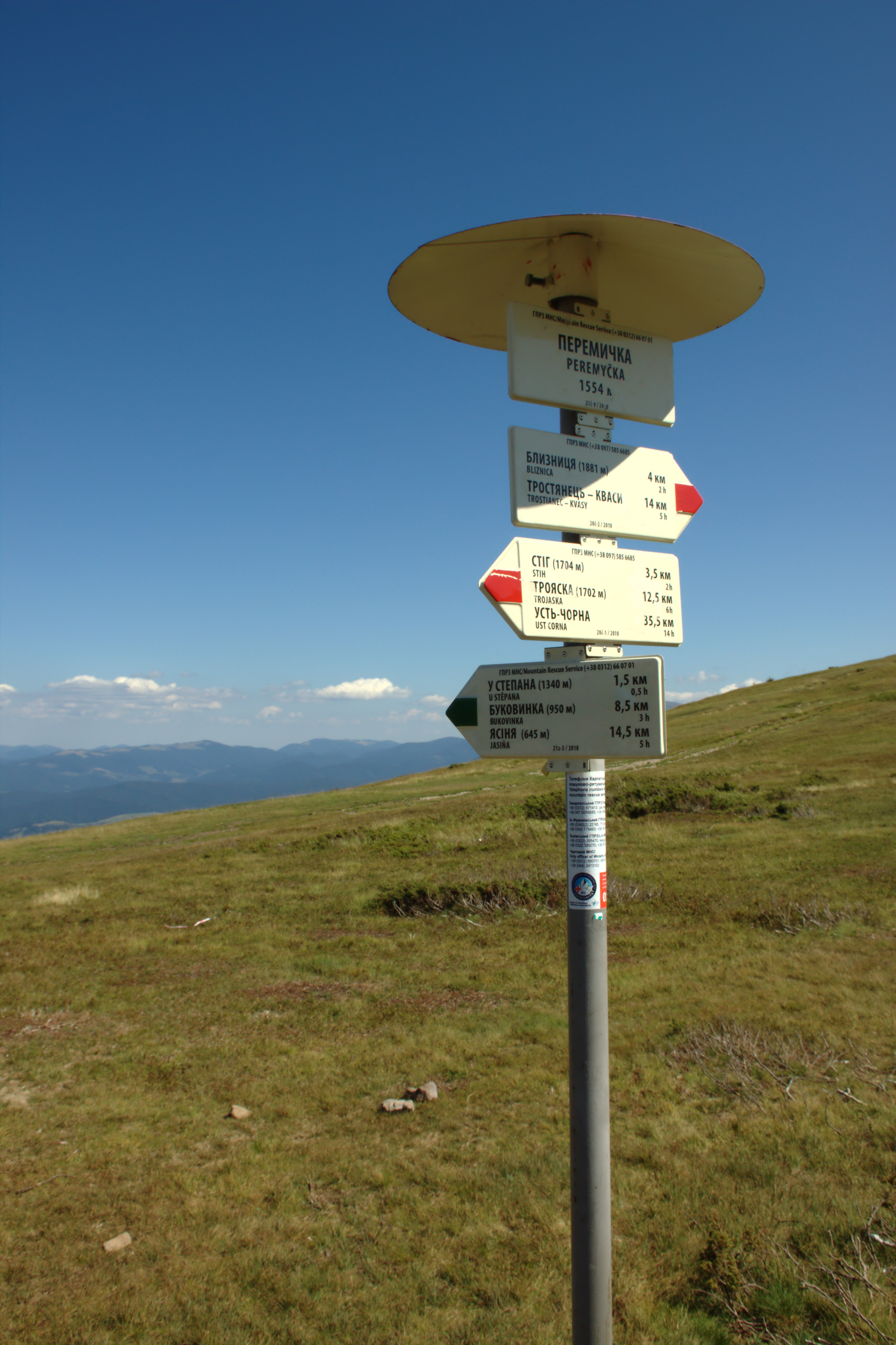
Czech transliteration of Ukrainian (Peremyčka, Jasiňa, U Stěpana) in Transcarpathia on the hiking fingerposts installed in 2010. However, the transliteration is not fully consistent – "Ust Corna" instead of "Usť Čorna", "Bliznica" instead of "Blyznycja" etc.

Romanization intended for readers of other languages than English is usually transcribed phonetically into the familiar orthography. For example, y, kh, ch, sh, shch for anglophones may be transcribed j, ch, tsch, sch, schtsch for German readers (for letters й, х, ч, ш, щ), or it may be rendered in Latin letters according to the normal orthography of another Slavic language, such as Polish or Croatian (such as the established system of scientific transliteration, described above).

Czech and Slovak standard transliteration uses letters with diacritics (ž, š, č, ď, ť, ň, ě) and letters i, y, j, h, ch, c in the local meaning. Diphthong letters are transcribed as two letters (ja, je, ji, ju, šč). Czech transliteration was used, for example, on hiking signs in Transcarpathia, which was established according to the methodology of the Czech Tourists Club – the Ukrainian markers replaced that later with the English transcription. However, the fact that Ukraine itself has started to use English transliteration on its documents and boards, also influences the practice in Czech and Slovak, which is also penetrated by English transliteration of Ukrainian.

==== Ad hoc romanization ====
Users of public-access computers or mobile text messaging services sometimes improvise informal romanization due to limitations in keyboard or character set. These may include both sound-alike and look-alike letter substitutions. Example: YKPAIHCbKA ABTOPKA for "УКРАЇНСЬКА АВТОРКА". See also Volapuk encoding.

This system uses the available character set.

==== Ukrainian telegraph code ====
For telegraph transmission. Each separate Ukrainian letter had a 1:1 equivalence to a Latin letter. Latin Q, W, V, and X are equivalent to Ukrainian Я (or sometimes Щ), В, Ж, Ь. Other letters are transcribed phonetically. This equivalency is used in building the KOI8-U table.

=== Transcription ===
Transcription is the representation of the spoken word. Phonological, or phonemic, transcription represents the phonemes, or meaningful sounds of a language, and is useful to describe the general pronunciation of a word. Phonetic transcription represents every single sound, or phone, and can be used to compare different dialects of a language. Both methods can use the same sets of symbols, but linguists usually denote phonemic transcriptions by enclosing them in slashes / ... /, while phonetic transcriptions are enclosed in square brackets [ ... ].

IPA

The International Phonetic Alphabet precisely represents pronunciation. It requires a special Unicode font.

== Conventional romanization of proper names ==
In many contexts, it is common to use a modified system of transliteration that strives to be read and pronounced naturally by anglophones. Such transcriptions are also used for the surnames of people of Ukrainian ancestry in English-speaking countries (personal names have often been translated to equivalent or similar English names, e.g., "Alexander" for Oleksandr, "Terry" for Taras).

Typically, such a modified transliteration is based on the ALA-LC, or Library of Congress (in North America), or, less commonly, the British Standard system. Such a simplified system usually omits diacritics and ligatures (tie-bars) from, e.g., i͡e, ï or ĭ, often simplifies -yĭ and -iĭ word endings to "-y", omits romanizing the Ukrainian soft sign (ь) and apostrophe ('), and may substitute ya, ye, yu, yo for ia, ie, iu, io at the beginnings of words. It may also simplify doubled letters. Unlike in the English language where an apostrophe is punctuation, in the Ukrainian language it is a letter. Therefore sometimes Rus' is translated with an apostrophe, even when the apostrophe is dropped for most other names and words.

Conventional transliterations can reflect the history of a person or place. Many well-known spellings are based on transcriptions into another Latin alphabet, such as the German or Polish. Others are transcribed from equivalent names in other languages, for example Ukrainian Pavlo ("Paul") may be called by the Russian equivalent Pavel, Ukrainian Kyiv by the Russian equivalent Kiev.

The employment of romanization systems can become complex. For example, the English translation of Kubijovyč's Ukraine: A Concise Encyclopædia uses a modified Library of Congress (ALA-LC) system as outlined above for Ukrainian and Russian names—with the exceptions for endings or doubled consonants applying variously to personal and geographic names. For technical reasons, maps in the Encyclopedia follow different conventions. Names of persons are anglicized in the encyclopedia's text but also presented in their original form in the index. Various geographic names are presented in their anglicized, Russian, or both Ukrainian and Polish forms, and appear in several forms in the index. Scientific transliteration is used in linguistics articles. The Encyclopedia's explanation of its transliteration and naming convention occupies 2-1/2 pages.

== Tables of romanization systems ==
Common systems for romanizing Ukrainian
Cyrillic	British (Note: British Standard: The character sequence тс = t-s, to distinguish it from ц = ts. Accents and diacritics may be omitted when back-transliteration is not required.)	BGN/PCGN 1965 (Note: BGN/PCGN 1965: The character sequences зг = z·h, кг = k·h, сг = s·h, тс = t·s, and цг = ts·h may be romanized with midpoints to differentiate them from the digraphs ж = zh, х = kh, ш = sh, ц = ts, and the letter sequence тш = tsh. Superseded by the Ukrainian National system in 2020.)	ALA-LC (Note: ALA-LC: When applied strictly, ALA-LC requires the use of the ligature (U+0361), but in practice these are often omitted.)	LC without diacritics	modified LC (Note: Modified Library of Congress: used for personal and place names. Initial Є‑ (I͡E‑), Й‑ (Ĭ‑), Ю‑ (I͡U‑), and Я‑ (I͡A‑) are rendered as Ye‑, Y‑, Yu‑, and Ya‑. Surname endings ‑ий (‑yĭ) and ‑ій (‑iĭ) are simplified as ‑y. Familiar names may be anglicized, for example, Михайло (Mykhaĭlo) = Michael, Олександр (Oleksandr) = Alexander. Practices vary.)	Ukrainian National (Note: Ukrainian National system: also “BGN/PCGN 2019”)	German dictionary	French dictionary	Swedish Language Council
А а	a	a	a	a	a	a	a	a	a
Б б	b	b	b	b	b	b	b	b	b
В в	v	v	v	v	v	v	w	v	v
Г г	h	h	h	h	h	h, gh (Note: Ukrainian National system: gh is used in the romanization of зг = zgh, avoiding confusion with ж = zh.)	h	h	h
Ґ ґ	g	g	g	g	g	g	g	g	g
Д д	d	d	d	d	d	d	d	d	d
Е е	e	e	e	e	e	e	e	e	e
Є є	ye	ye	i͡e	ie	ie, ye-	ie, ye- (Note: Ukrainian National system: The second variant is used at the beginning of a word.)	je	ie	je
Ж ж	zh	zh	z͡h	zh	zh	zh	sh	j	zj
З з	z	z	z	z	z	z	s	z	z
И и	ȳ	y	y	y	y	y	y	y	y
І і	i	i	i	i	i	i	i	i	i
Ї ї	yi	yi	ï	ï	i	i, yi- (Note: Yi is used at the beginning of words, i is used in other positions)	ji	ï	ji, (formerly) ï
Й й	ĭ	y	ĭ	i	i, y-	i, y-	j	y	j
К к	k	k	k	k	k	k	k	k	k
Л л	l	l	l	l	l	l	l	l	l
М м	m	m	m	m	m	m	m	m	m
Н н	n	n	n	n	n	n	n	n	n
О о	o	o	o	o	o	o	o	o	o
П п	p	p	p	p	p	p	p	p	p
Р р	r	r	r	r	r	r	r	r	r
С с	s	s	s	s	s	s	s, ss	s	s
Т т	t	t	t	t	t	t	t	t	t
У у	u	u	u	u	u	u	u	ou	u
Ф ф	f	f	f	f	f	f	f	f	f
Х х	kh	kh	kh	kh	kh	kh	ch	kh	ch
Ц ц	ts	ts	t͡s	ts	ts	ts	z	ts	ts
Ч ч	ch	ch	ch	ch	ch	ch	tsch	tch	tj
Ш ш	sh	sh	sh	sh	sh	sh	sch	ch	sj
Щ щ	shch	shch	shch	shch	shch	shch	schtsch	chtch	sjtj
Ь ь	ʼ or ʹ	ʼ	ʹ	ʹ
Ю ю	yu	yu	i͡u	iu	iu, yu-	iu, yu-	ju	iou	ju, iu, (Note: Used after t, s and z to avoid confusion with tj, sj and zj) u (Note: Used after tj, sj and zj to avoid double ⟨jj⟩.)
Я я	ya	ya	i͡a	ia	ia, ya	ia, ya-	ja	ia	ja, ia, a
ʼ	ˮ or ʺ	ˮ		ʼ
Historical letters
Ъ ъ	ˮ or ʺ
Ѣ ѣ	i

International systems for romanizing Ukrainian
Cyrillic	Scientific (OUk)	Scientific (MUk)	Scientific	Prussian Instr.	ISO 1954	ISO 1968 basic	ISO 1968 Ukr. var.	ISO 1995
А а	a	a	a	a	a	a	a	a
Б б	b	b	b	b	b	b	b	b
В в	v	v	v	v	v	v	v	v
Г г	g	h	h	h	g	g	h	g
Ґ ґ		g	g	ġ	ġ	g	g	g̀
Д д	d	d	d	d	d	d	d	d
Е е	e	e	e	e	e	e	e	e
Є є			je	je	je	je	je	ê
Ж ж	ž	ž	ž	ž	ž	ž	ž	ž
З з	z	z	z	z	z	z	z	z
И и	i	y	y	i	i	i	y	i
І і	i	y	i	ī	i	ī	i	ì
Ї ї			ji		ji	ï	ï	ï
Й й		j	j	j	j	j	j	j
К к	k	k	k	k	k	k	k	k
Л л	l	l	l	l	l	l	l	l
М м	m	m	m	m	m	m	m	m
Н н	n	n	n	n	n	n	n	n
О о	o	o	o	o	o	o	o	o
П п	p	p	p	p	p	p	p	p
Р р	r	r	r	r	r	r	r	r
С с	s	s	s	s	s	s	s	s
Т т	t	t	t	t	t	t	t	t
У у	u	u	u	u	u	u	u	u
Ф ф	f	f	f	f	f	f	f	f
Х х	x	x	x	ch	h	h	ch	h
Ц ц	c	c	c	c	c	c	c	c
Ч ч	č	č	č	č	č	č	č	č
Ш ш	š	š	š	š	š	š	š	š
Щ щ	šč	šč	šč	šč	šč	šč	šč	ŝ
Ь ь	ь	ʼ	ʼ	ʹ	ʼ	ʹ	ʹ	ʹ
Ю ю	ju	ju	ju	ju	ju	ju	ju	û
Я я	ja	ja	ja	ja	ja	ja	ja	â
ʼ					ʺ, ʼ	ʺ	ʺ	ʼ
Historical letters
Ъ ъ	ъ	ʺ		_	ʺ	ʺ
Ы ы	y	y̌		y	y	y
Ѣ ѣ	i	i		i	i	i
Ѥ ѥ	je	je
Ѧ ѧ	ę	ę
Ѩ ѩ	ję	ję
Ѫ ѫ	ǫ	ǫ		ă	ȧ	ʺ̣
Ѭ ѭ	jǫ	jǫ
Ѯ ѯ	ks	ks
Ѱ ѱ	ps	ps
Ѳ ѳ	th	th		ḟ	ḟ	ḟ
Ѵ ѵ				ẏ	ẏ	ẏ
Ѡ ѡ	o	o

Ukrainian official systems for romanizing Ukrainian
Cyrillic	GOST 1971	GOST 1986	Derzhstandart 1995	National 1996	Passport 2004	Passport 2007	National 2010
А а	a	a	a	a	a	a	a
Б б	b	b	b	b	b	b	b
В в	v	v	v	v	v, w	v	v
Г г	g	g	gh	h, gh (Note: gh is used in the romanization of зг (zgh), avoiding confusion with ж (zh).)	h, g	g	h, gh
Ґ ґ			g	g	g, h	g	g
Д д	d	d	d	d	d	d	d
Е е	e	e	e	e	e	e	e
Є є	je	je	je	ie, ye- (Note: The second transliteration is used word-initially.)	ie, ye-	ie	ie, ye-
Ж ж	zh	ž	zh	zh (Note: National (1996) system: transliteration can be rendered in a simplified form. Doubled consonants ж, х, ц, ч, ш are simplified, for example Запоріжжя = Zaporizhia. Apostrophe and soft sign are omitted, but always render ьо = 'o and ьї = 'i.)	zh, j	zh	zh
З з	z	z	z	z	z	z	z
И и	i	i	y	y	y	y	y
І i	i	i	i	i	i	i	i
Ї ї	ji	i	ji	i, yi- (Note: Yi is used at the beginning of words, i is used in other positions)	i, yi-	i	i, yi-
Й й	j	j	j (Note: Word-initially, after vowels or after the apostrophe.)	i, y-	i, y-	i	i, y-
К к	k	k	k	k	k, c	k	k
Л л	l	l	l	l	l	l	l
М м	m	m	m	m	m	m	m
Н н	n	n	n	n	n	n	n
О о	o	o	o	o	o	o	o
П п	p	p	p	p	p	p	p
Р р	r	r	r	r	r	r	r
С с	s	s	s	s	s	s	s
Т т	t	t	t	t	t	t	t
У у	u	u	u	u	u	u	u
Ф ф	f	f	f	f	f	f	f
Х х	kh	h	kh	kh	kh	kh	kh
Ц ц	c	c	c	ts	ts	ts	ts
Ч ч	ch	č	ch	ch	ch	ch	ch
Ш ш	sh	š	sh	sh	sh	sh	sh
Щ щ	shh	šč	shh	sch	shch	shch	shch
Ь ь	ʹ	ʹ	j (Note: After consonants.)	ʼ	ʹ
Ю ю	ju	ju	ju	iu, yu-	iu, yu-	iu	iu, yu-
Я я	ja	ja	ja	ia, ya-	ia, ya-	ia	ia, ya-
ʼ	*	ʺ	ʼ (Note: Apostrophe is used before iotated ja, ju, je, ji, jo, and to distinguish the combination ьа (j'a) in compound words from я (ja), for example, Волиньавто = Volynj'avto.)	ˮ

== See also ==
- Cyrillic alphabets
- Gaj's Latin alphabet
- Romanization of Belarusian
- Romanization of Bulgarian
- Romanization of Macedonian
- Romanization of Russian
- Scientific transliteration of Cyrillic
