= DSTU 9112:2021 =

- DSTU 9112:2021 "Cyrillic-Latin transliteration and Latin-Cyrillic retransliteration of Ukrainian texts. Writing rules"
- Abbreviation: ДСТУ 9112:2021
- Native name: ДСТУ 9112:2021 «Кирилично-латинична транслітерація і латинично-кирилична ретранслітерація українських текстів. Правила написання»
- Status: Current
- Year started: 1 April 2022
- Organization: State Scientific and Technical Library of Ukraine
- Committee: Technical Committee for Standardization "Information and Documentation" (TC 144)

The DSTU 9112:2021 "Cyrillic-Latin transliteration and Latin-Cyrillic retransliteration of Ukrainian texts. Writing rules" (Note: ДСТУ 9112:2021 «Кирилично-латинична транслітерація і латинично-кирилична ретранслітерація українських текстів. Правила написання».: According to system A: DSTU 9112:2021 «Kyrylyčno-latynyčna transliteracija i latynyčno-kyrylyčna retransliteracija ukraïnsjkyx tekstiv. Pravyla napysannja».; According to system B: DSTU 9112:2021 «Kyrylychno-latynychna transliteracija i latynychno-kyrylychna retransliteracija ukrajinsjkykh tekstiv. Pravyla napysannja».) was approved on 1 April 2022 as a State Standard of Ukraine. (Note: Ukrainian: Державний стандарт України (ДСТУ), romanized: Derzhavnyj standart Ukrajiny (DSTU).) It established two official systems ("A" and "B") for the romanisation of Ukrainian. The standard is based on modified ISO 9:1995 standard and was developed by the Technical Committee 144 "Information and Documentation" of the State Scientific and Technical Library of Ukraine. According to the SSTL, it could be used in future cooperation between the European Union and Ukraine, in which "Ukrainian will soon, along with other European languages, take its rightful place in multilingual natural language processing scenarios, including machine translation."

== Application of the standard ==
The standard applies to for Cyrillic-Latin transliteration (Latinisation) and retransliteration into Cyrillic (reverse transliteration) of Ukrainian texts:

- in international information databases and multilingual text corpora;
- in international information systems;
- in scientometric systems;
- in documents certifying a natural or legal person;
- in printed materials (geographical maps, monographs, reference books, etc.)
- for the details of official document forms (agreements, letters, protocols, acts, etc.) and addresses on the envelope containing the official document;
- on signs and road signs to indicate the names of streets, institutions, organisations, establishments and settlements
- in telecommunication networks;
- on vehicles and other objects under the jurisdiction of Ukraine;
- for trademarks and advertising texts;
- for the names of clubs and sports teams;
- in other cases where there is a need to translate or retranslate Ukrainian texts.

The standard is intended for transliteration and reverse transliteration (retransliteration) of Ancient Ukrainian (Ukrainian varieties of Old East Slavic), Old Ukrainian (Ruthenian) and New Ukrainian texts (Modern Ukrainian since c. 1800).

== Systems ==
The standard provides transliteration systems with diacritics (System A) and without diacritics (System B) for Ancient, Old, and Modern Ukrainian. The transliteration rules for the alphabets currently in use are as follows.

Ukrainian alphabet		System A (Система A)		System B (Система Б)	
Ukrainian alphabet		Latin	Note	Latin	Note
А	а	a		a	
Б	б	b	To b' if before й	b	To b' if before й
В	в	v	To v' if before й	v	To v' if before й
Г	г	ğ	To ğ' if before й	gh	To gh' if before й
Ґ	ґ	g	To g' if before й	g	To g' if before й
Д	д	d	To d' if before й	d	To d' if before й
Е	е	e		e	
Є	є	je		je	
Ж	ж	ž	To ž' if before й	zh	To zh' if before й
З	з	z	To z' if before й	z	To z' if before й
И	и	y		y	
І	і	i		i	
Ї	ї	ï		ji	
Й	й	j	To j' if before а, е, у	j	To j' if before а, е, i, у
К	к	k	To k' if before й	k	To k' if before й
Л	л	l	To l' if before й	l	To l' if before й
М	м	m	To m' if before й	m	To m' if before й
Н	н	n	To n' if before й	n	To n' if before й
О	о	o		o	
П	п	p	To p' if before й	p	To p' if before й
Р	р	r	To r' if before й	r	To r' if before й
С	с	s	To s' if before й	s	To s' if before й
Т	т	t	To t' if before й	t	To t' if before й
У	у	u		u	
Ф	ф	f	To f' if before й	f	To f' if before й
Х	х	x	To x' if before й	kh	To kh' if before й
Ц	ц	c	To c' if before й	c	To c' if before й
Ч	ч	č	To č' if before й	ch	To ch' if before й
Ш	ш	š	To š' if before й	sh	To sh' if before й, ч
Щ	щ	ŝ	To ŝ' if before й	shch	To shch' if before й
Ь	ь	j	To j' if before а, е, у, to ĵ if in isolated position	j	To j' if before а, е, i, у, to hj if in isolated position
Ю	ю	ju		ju	
Я	я	ja		ja	
' (Apostrophe)		'		'	

== Examples ==
Cyrillic (Кирилиця)	Transliteration according to system A (Транслітерація за системою А)	Transliteration according to system B (Транслітерація за системою Б)	English Wikipedia (for comparison)
Вінниця	Vinnycja	Vinnycja	Vinnytsia
Дніпро	Dnipro	Dnipro	Dnipro
Донецьк	Donecjk	Donecjk	Donetsk
Житомир	Žytomyr	Zhytomyr	Zhytomyr
Запоріжжя	Zaporižžja	Zaporizhzhja	Zaporizhzhia
Івано-Франківськ	Ivano-Frankivsjk	Ivano-Frankivsjk	Ivano-Frankivsk
Київ	Kyïv	Kyjiv	Kyiv
Кропивницький	Kropyvnycjkyj	Kropyvnycjkyj	Kropyvnytskyi
Луганськ	Luğansjk	Lughansjk	Luhansk
Луцьк	Lucjk	Lucjk	Lutsk
Львів	Ljviv	Ljviv	Lviv
Миколаїв	Mykolaïv	Mykolajiv	Mykolaiv
Одеса	Odesa	Odesa	Odesa
Полтава	Poltava	Poltava	Poltava
Рівне	Rivne	Rivne	Rivne
Сімферополь	Simferopolj	Simferopolj	Simferopol
Суми	Sumy	Sumy	Sumy
Тернопіль	Ternopilj	Ternopilj	Ternopil
Ужгород	Užğorod	Uzhghorod	Uzhhorod
Харків	Xarkiv	Kharkiv	Kharkiv
Херсон	Xerson	Kherson	Kherson
Хмельницький	Xmeljnycjkyj	Khmeljnycjkyj	Khmelnytskyi
Черкаси	Čerkasy	Cherkasy	Cherkasy
Чернівці	Černivci	Chernivci	Chernivtsi
Чернігів	Černiğiv	Chernighiv	Chernihiv
Україна	Ukraïna	Ukrajina	Ukraine

Below is the first stanza of the State Anthem of Ukraine in the two official transliteration standards.

Cyrillic (Кирилиця)	Transliteration according to system A (Транслітерація за системою А)	Transliteration according to system B (Транслітерація за системою Б)	English translation
Ще не вмерла України ні слава, ні воля. Ще нам, браття молодії, усміхнеться доля. Згинуть наші воріженьки, як роса на сонці, Запануєм і ми, браття, у своїй сторонці. Душу й тіло ми положим за нашу свободу І покажем, що ми, браття, козацького роду!	Ŝe ne vmerla Ukraïny ni slava, ni volja. Ŝe nam, brattja molodiï, usmixnetjsja dolja. Zğynutj naši voriženjky, jak rosa na sonci, Zapanujem i my, brattja, u svoïj storonci. Dušu j tilo my položym za našu svobodu I pokažem, ŝo my, brattja, kozacjkoğo rodu!	Shche ne vmerla Ukrajiny ni slava, ni volja. Shche nam, brattja molodiji, usmikhnetjsja dolja. Zghynutj nashi vorizhenjky, jak rosa na sonci, Zapanujem i my, brattja, u svojij storonci. Dushu j tilo my polozhym za nashu svobodu I pokazhem, shcho my, brattja, kozacjkogho rodu!	The glory and will of Ukraine has not yet perished, And yet still upon us, brothers, fate shall smile once more. Our enemies shall melt away, like the dew in the sun. And we too shall rule, O brethen, the homeland of our own. Soul and body shall we lay down for our liberty, And we'll show, O brethen, that we're a Cossack family!

== Sources ==
- TC 144 (1 April 2022). "ДСТУ 9112:2021 : Технічний комітет стандартизації «Інформація і документація» (ТК 144), Державна науково-технічна бібліотека України, УкрНДНЦ" [DSTU 9112:2021 : Technical Committee for Standardisation 'Information and Documentation' (TC 144), State Scientific and Technical Library of Ukraine, UkrSTSc]. Internet Archive (in Ukrainian).
