= State Scientific and Technical Library of Ukraine =

- Державна науково-технічна бібліотека України (ДНТБ України)
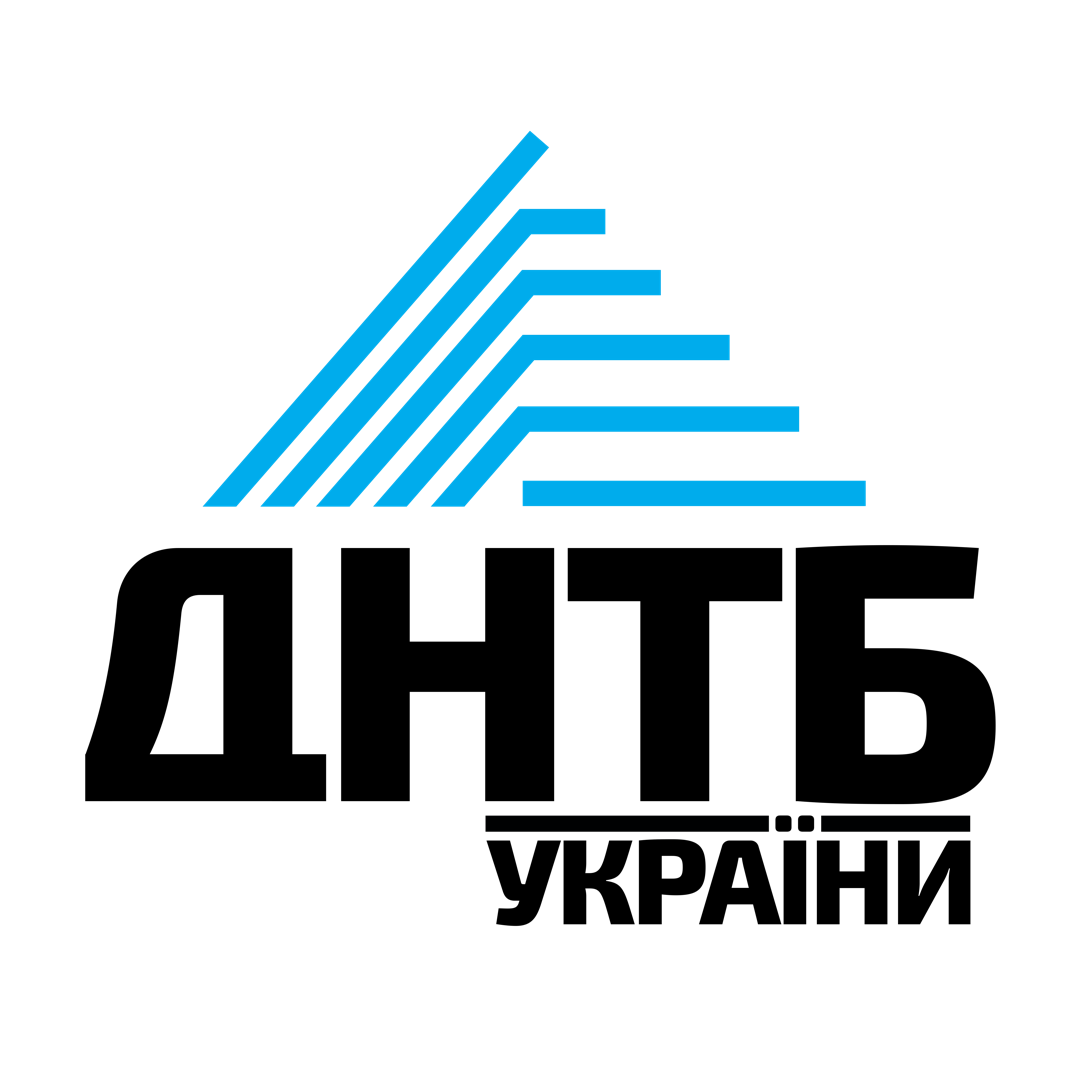

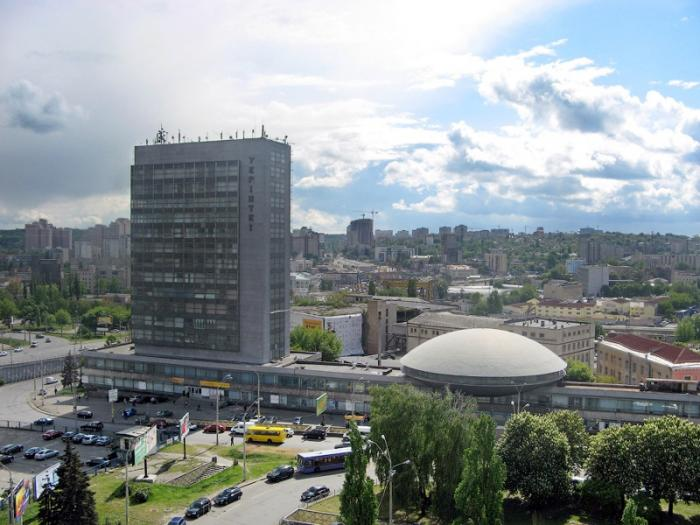
- The State Scientific and Technical Library of Ukraine
- 50.41122589805679°N 30.52564541930199°E
- Location: 180 Antonovycha Street; Kyiv, 03680, Ukraine
- Type: Academic library
- Established: March 1935 (91 years ago)

Collection
- Items collected: Books, journals, newspapers, magazines, patents, databases
- Size: 18 million items

Access and use
- Access requirements: Open to anyone with a need to use the collections and services

Other information
- Director: Alla Zharinova (Acting Director, since 2016)
- Website: https://dntb.gov.ua/en/

The State Scientific and Technical Library of Ukraine, SSTL (Ukrainian: Державна науково-технічна бібліотека України) is the main academic library of Ukraine and is part of the system of scientific and technical information of the Ministry of Education and Science of Ukraine. The purpose of the State Scientific and Technical Library of Ukraine activity is to promote the implementation of state policy in the field of education, science and culture, and to ensure the access of scientists, specialists, and citizens to sources of scientific and technical information.

== History ==
In March 1935, the Interbranch Technical Library of the USSR was created that was the branch of the State Scientific Library (SSL) of the People's Commissariat of Heavy Industry (Narkomtiofjazhprom) of the USSR. In 1936, the Kyiv Branch of the National Library of Ukraine made 5 thousand copies of publications and served 20 thousand readers.

During World War II, almost all the fund and the library building itself were destroyed.

The restoration of the library began in late 1946. Until 1958, the name and subordination of the library changed several times. The renewed funds as of January 1, 1959, amounted to more than 200,000 units.

The library was granted the status of the State Republican Scientific and Technical Library on June 6, 1960. The modern name in the time of independent Ukraine was given in 1992. Today the library belongs to the sphere of management of the Ministry of Education and Science of Ukraine.

== Holdings ==
The collection of the State Scientific and Technical Library of Ukraine contains more than 18 million items: patent documents, industrial and normative technical documents, dissertations, reports on R&D, deposited scientific works, books and periodicals of scientific and technical kind.

== Scientific ctivities ==
The State Scientific and Technical Library of Ukraine conducts a number of scientific activities, the main ones are:

- conducting research in the field of library and information sciences
- meeting information needs of users, including employees of industrial, scientific and research institutions, representatives of the private sector;
- preservation, organization and maintenance of the diversified fund of scientific and technical literature;
- formation and use of scientific and technical information resources, including conducting scientific and information research on development and improvement of fund formation processes and the creation of a reference search engine;
- formation and development of the system of bibliographic indexes of the national scientific and technical bibliographic databases.
- provides promotion of introduction and use of computer information and library technologies in the network of scientific and technical libraries;
- depositing the results of intellectual activity and creating relevant information products;
- information support of scientific research, including that of through organization of a centralized subscription to access scientific information and databases,
- providing advisory and practical assistance to users;
- conducting scientific and practical conferences, exhibitions, workshops, including international ones, ensuring the popularization of the results of scientific activity;
- scientific methodical and organizational work, organization of a permanent system of professional development of employees of the network of scientific and technical libraries of Ukraine.

== Research projects ==
The State Scientific and Technical Library of Ukraine holds an important position in the digitization and advancement of the national research infrastructure. The library has undertaken a number of projects in this endeavor. Among successful projects are:

Open Ukrainian Citation Index (OUCI) is a search engine and a citation database based on publication metadata from Crossref members. OUCI is intended to simplify the search of scientific publications, to attract the editors’ attention to the problem of completeness and quality of the metadata of Ukrainian scholarly publications, and will allow bibliometricians to freely study the relations between authors and documents from various disciplines, in particular in the field of social sciences and humanities. This project is aimed at supporting the Initiative for Open Citations.

Within the framework of Ukrainian-German scientific cooperation, aimed at strengthening scientific and research cooperation, SSTL with TIB Technische Informationsbibliothek successfully collaborated on a joint project FAIR Research Information in Open Infrastructures (FAIRIO). As a result a roadmap towards application of the FAIR data principles on research information (metadata) and facilitation of CRIS technologies was developed and published. In their study, the authors emphasized the need for research performing institutions to prevent proprietary companies from monopolizing research information, drawing attention to the similar situation witnessed in the scientific publishing market. They concluded that all scholarly metadata, including abstracts, should be licensed under a CC0 license without any exceptions, ensuring open and unrestricted access to research information.

Ukrainian Research Information System (URIS) is a system designed to efficiently collect, manage, and present information on scientific activities and ongoing research conducted by Ukrainian researchers. It encompasses a wide range of research outputs, projects, organizations, research equipment and facilities. As part of its future development, URIS aims to expand its functionality to serve as a gateway for booking technological services and research infrastructures. Furthermore, it is anticipated that URIS will provide access to government services associated with the research domain in the future, thereby streamlining and enhancing the research ecosystem.

National ORCID Consortia. In October 2022, SSTL took the initiative to establish National ORCID Consortia, forming the consortium with 17 members, including key universities and research performing organizations. As the Consortia Lead organization, SSTL is committed to enhancing the visibility of Ukrainian research and researchers through consortia objectives - improving metadata quality at a national level, making national research domain more transparent, supporting National Open Access Action Plan adapted by the Government of Ukraine on October, 8th 2023.

== See also ==
- List of libraries in Ukraine
