= Pankevychivka =

Pankevychivka (Ukrainian: Панькевичі́вка) was Ukrainian phonetic etymological orthography compiled in 1922 by Ivan Pankevych for schools in Carpathian Ruthenia on the basis of Maksymovychivka.

Pankevych's principles were approved in 1920 at the Congress of Transcarpathian Teachers, and later set out in the Grammar of the Ruthenian Language (Mukachevo, 1922). The main principle of this system is to take into account local traditions, in particular:

- preservation ѣ: єѣ, тоѣ, синьоѣ; тѣ, добрѣ;
- dialectal features of phonetics (phonology) — ы: ты, сынъ, мыло;
- different reflexes /ɔ/ in the new closed syllable — і, ÿ, у, denoted by the letter о̂.

Pankevychivka existed until 1945 and was replaced by the all-Ukrainian orthography.

== See also ==
- Kulishivka
- Zhelekhivka
- Maksymovychivka

== Sources ==
- Pankevychivka from the Encyclopedia "Ukrainian language"
- Mushinka MI Ivan Pankevych and Transcarpathia // Proceedings of the scientific conference dedicated to the memory of Ivan Pankevych (October 23-24, 1992). — Uzhhorod, 1992. — P. 151—175.
