= Zhelekhivka =

Historic orthography of the Ukrainian language

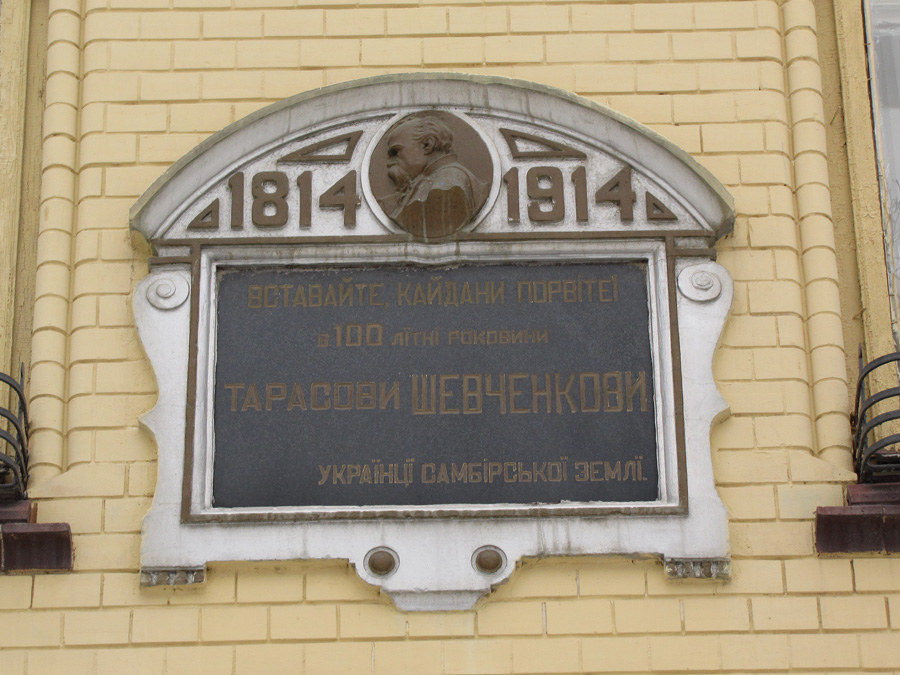
Example of text on Zhelekhivka

Zhelekhivka (Ukrainian: Желехі́вка) was Ukrainian phonetic orthography in Western Ukraine from 1886 to 1922 (sometimes until the 1940s), created by Yevhen Zhelekhivskyi on the basis of the Civil Script and phonetic spelling common in the Ukrainian language at that time (with some changes) for his own "Little Russian-German Dictionary", which was published in full in 1886.

== History ==
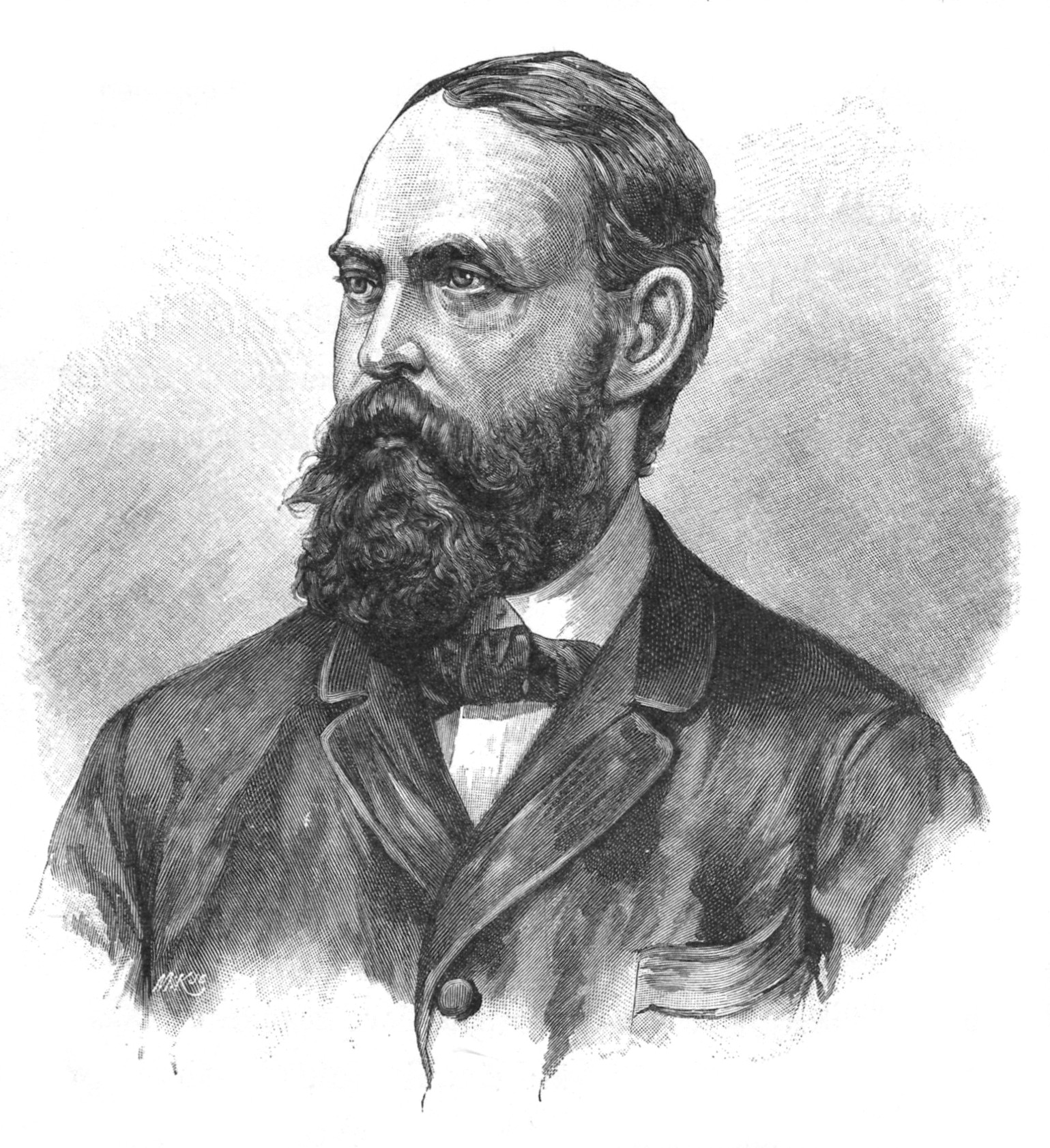
Yevhen Zhelekhivskyi

It was for the "Little Russian-German Dictionary" that E. Zhelekhivskyi created his own phonetic spelling, which he built on the basis of Kulishivka, common in eastern Ukraine. It was an attempt to unite the Galician dialect and the new Ukrainian literary language, to develop general rules of spelling. After all, in the late nineteenth century. Galicians wrote many words based on their own dialectical features.

The novelty of this spelling was the consistent use of it not only instead of /jі/, but also on the consonant in place of the ancient ѣ and /ɛ/. Zhelekhivka was firmly established among the supporters of phonetic spelling in both Galicia and Bukovina. In fact, it was not some news, because in its main features we find it in the writings of, for example, Omelian Ohonovskyi.

Zhelekhivka is enshrined in the Ruthenian Grammar by Stepan Smal-Stotskyi and Theodor Gartner, published in 1893 in Lviv, a year earlier, Zhelekhivsky's system had been declared official for the Ukrainian language in Austria-Hungary (instead of Maksymovychivka), because for the first time by order of the Austrian Ministry of Education "Ruthenian Grammar" became official in schools and government records of Galicia. Iryna Farion considers the published "Ruthenian Grammar" according to the system of E. Zhelekhivskyi to be the final point in the victory of the Ukrainophiles. With the advent of the "Little Russian-German Dictionary" and, consequently, the new spelling, "Iazychie" as a pasta literary language, gradually fell out of use.

Zhelekhivka, in addition to Kulishivka and Drahomanivka, was more thoroughly worked out by the language commission at the Scientific Society named after Taras Shevchenko, who in 1904 published "Ruthenian orthography with a dictionary." Borys Hrinchenko used the Zhelekhivka with some changes in the four-volume "Dictionaries of the Ukrainian Language" published by him, and most of the spelling rules applied by him are still in force.

The spelling lasted until 1922, and in some places until the 1940s, when it was replaced by a new spelling system of the Ukrainian Academy of Sciences.

== Features of orthography ==
Features of this spelling determined the dialectal features of Galician dialects:

- The letters ъ, ѣ, ы were removed from the alphabet;
- The sound /ɛ/ is transmitted by the letter е, /ɪ/ — through и: верх, син;
- The sound combination /je/ is transmitted through є: Єва, житє, єднати, зїлє, /ji/ — through ї: їхав, мої, /ju/ — through ю: Юрій, конюшина, /ja/ — through я: яструб, маля, /jo/ — through йо/ьо/ё: Йосип, йолуп, but in the transfer of softness before /ɔ/ the lexicographer was inconsistent: стьобати — стёбати, сьомий — сёгочасний, цьонька «свиня» — цёпку «трошечки». This inconsistency was later eliminated along with the letter ё;
- The sound /g/ is transmitted through ґ, and the affricates /d͡ʒ/ and /d͡z/ through дж, дз, respectively: ґанок, зоольоґія, ґава, ґедз, ґринджоли;
- In foreign words preserved soft л: клюб, плян, блюза, кляса, льокальний, Клявдия;
- The apostrophe is placed on the border of the prefix and the root of the word, which begins with a vowel, if there is no separate pronunciation or just before the iota after the infinitive: з'явленє, з'єднати, з'явище, з'їзд, під'їсти, з'юшити, з'орати, роз'учитися, ин'як «інакше», but the separate pronunciation of the lips with iotated in the letter is not indicated: бити — бю, бєш, пити — пю, пє, пєш, вюн, вяз, мякий, мясо. The introduction of the apostrophe into the New Ukrainian orthography is the merit Zhelekhivskyi's є;
- In nouns of the middle genus there was no lengthening of the rustling and the written ending є in accordance with the Dnieper я: зїлє, житє, знанє;
- Adjective suffixes -ський, -цький are not softened: україньский, нїмецкий;
- With the help of ь the softness /z/, /t͡s/, /s/ before /v/ and in general any hard lip: сьміх, сьвято, сьвіт, цьвях, цьвіркати, зьвір;
- The grammatical particle -ся is written separately from the verb: учить ся, являєть ся, сьміяти ся, as well as the ending -му, -меш, -ме from the infinitive in the future tense forms of the imperfect form: робити ме, ходити меш (або меш ходити).

Zhelekhivskyi's system is based on those dialects where the corresponding whispers before /i/, which originates from /ɔ/ in the newly closed syllable, are pronounced firmly: столъ > стіл, долъ > діл, носъ > ніс, and before /i/, which originates from /ɛ/ in the newly closed syllable and in place ѣ, — softly: неслъ > нїс, осень > осїнь, дѣдъ > дїд, etc.

In connection with the distinction in a significant part of the Ukrainian dialects of hard and soft dental before the sound /i/ the system of iotated in the Ukrainian language is supplemented:

- The letter ї was also written for the sound /i/, which appeared from ѣ and with /ɛ/ on soft dental rustles /d/, /t/, /z/, /t͡s/, /s/, /l/, /n/: дїл — дїло, але діл — долу, тїло, цїна, сїно, лїс, тїк − текти, but тік − току, нїс − нести, but ніс − носа тощо, etc.;
- On hard teeth and instead of etymological /ɔ/ the letter і is used: стіл, сік — соку, but сїк — сїкла, кіт, міняти, etc.

In other words, Zhelekhivka testified to the important distinction between soft and hard pronunciation of consonants before /i/ preserved in some Ukrainian dialects, which is not a narrow dialectal feature, but has a common Slavic etymological root: «у цій рудї руді домішки», «я волїв не купляти цих волів», «вуж лїз серед ліз», «на цьому лисї лисі плями», «твій ніж довший, нїж мій», «потік тїк через тік», etc.

=== Example of use ===
В тонкім флюїдї миготїнь

Купаєть ся земля і море,

Розчинюєть житє і смерть

І родить ся добро та горе.

== Criticism ==
This orthography had both significant advantages over previous spellings and certain shortcomings; It was contradictory, in particular, to write the letter ї instead of і in place of historical ѣ and е, which made sense in the western dialects and dialects of the Right-bank, where the distinction between hard and soft dental consonants before і was preserved, but created some inconvenience for some Eastern dialects. This distinction has disappeared over time.

Ivan Franko — more as a writer than as a linguist — did not accept Zhelekhivka and at first protested against it, but still later he himself wrote it (after Drahomanivka), when he actively cooperated with the Scientific Society. T. Shevchenko and his publications, and in "Essays on the history of Ukrainian-Russian literature before 1890." noted: "Zhelekhivskyi's Dictionary", having adopted phonetic spelling, became the basis for the later victory of phonetics in schools and governments." Eastern Ukrainian writers and scholars, such as Borys Hrinchenko, reacted negatively to Zhelekhivka. However, the Western Ukrainian intelligentsia and the general public took this spelling quite favorably.

Although Mykhailo Hrushevskyi was a popularizer of the Zhelekhivka in Dnieper Ukraine (in publications after the 1905 revolution, mainly in the Literary-Scientific Bulletin), the Hrinchenkivka, a spelling modified by Borys Hrinchenko and used in the Dictionary of the Ukrainian Language, was adopted.

== Modern use ==
Two modern written standards of the Rusyn language are based on Zhelekhivka:

- Presov-Ruthenian dialect, developed by Vasily Yabur, Anna Plishkova and Kvetoslav Koporov.
- Bachvan-Ruthenian dialect, which is being developed in Serbia by Julian Ramach, Helena Mediesi and Mykhailo Feisa, and in Hungary by Mykhailo Kapral and Vira Girits.

== See also ==
- Ukrainian alphabet

== Sources ==
- Півторак Г. Желехівка // Українська мова : енциклопедія / НАН України, Інститут мовознавства ім. О. О. Потебні, Інститут української мови ; ред. В. М. Русанівський [та ін.]. — К. : Українська енциклопедія, 2000. — ISBN 966-7492-07-9. — С. 646.
- Желехівка // Українська мала енциклопедія : 16 кн. : у 8 т. / проф. Є. Онацький. — Накладом Адміністратури УАПЦ в Аргентині. — Буенос-Айрес, 1959. — Т. 2, кн. 4 : Літери Ж — Й. — С. 439. — 1000 екз.
