= Belarusian Braille =

Braille alphabet of the Belarusian language

- Script type: alphabet
- Print basis: Belarusian alphabet
- Languages: Belarusian

Related scripts
- Parent systems: Braille: Russian Braille; Belarusian Braille

Belarusian Braille is the braille alphabet of the Belarusian language. It is based on Russian Braille, with a couple additional letters found in the print Belarusian alphabet.

== Alphabet ==
Belarusian does not use all the letters of the Russian alphabet, and it has the additional letters і and ў.

Print	а a	б b	в v	г g	д d	е e	ё jo	ж ž	з z	і i	й j
Braille	⠁ (braille pattern dots-1)	⠃ (braille pattern dots-12)	⠺ (braille pattern dots-2456)	⠛ (braille pattern dots-1245)	⠙ (braille pattern dots-145)	⠑ (braille pattern dots-15)	⠡ (braille pattern dots-16)	⠚ (braille pattern dots-245)	⠵ (braille pattern dots-1356)	⠽ (braille pattern dots-13456)	⠯ (braille pattern dots-12346)
Print	к k	л l	м m	н n	о o	п p	р r	с s	т t	у u	ў ŭ
Braille	⠅ (braille pattern dots-13)	⠇ (braille pattern dots-123)	⠍ (braille pattern dots-134)	⠝ (braille pattern dots-1345)	⠕ (braille pattern dots-135)	⠏ (braille pattern dots-1234)	⠗ (braille pattern dots-1235)	⠎ (braille pattern dots-234)	⠞ (braille pattern dots-2345)	⠥ (braille pattern dots-136)	⠬ (braille pattern dots-346)
Print	ф f	х ch	ц c	ч č	ш š	ы y	ь ’	э è	ю ju	я ja	
Braille	⠋ (braille pattern dots-124)	⠓ (braille pattern dots-125)	⠉ (braille pattern dots-14)	⠟ (braille pattern dots-12345)	⠱ (braille pattern dots-156)	⠮ (braille pattern dots-2346)	⠾ (braille pattern dots-23456)	⠪ (braille pattern dots-246)	⠳ (braille pattern dots-1256)	⠫ (braille pattern dots-1246)	⠀ (braille pattern blank)

The letters і and ў are the mirror images of й and у, and the і was once found in Russian Braille. (See obsolete letters of Russian Braille.)

== Punctuation ==
Single punctuation:

Print	,	.	?	!	;	:	-	'
Braille	⠂ (braille pattern dots-2)	⠲ (braille pattern dots-256)	⠢ (braille pattern dots-26)	⠖ (braille pattern dots-235)	⠆ (braille pattern dots-23)	⠒ (braille pattern dots-25)	⠤ (braille pattern dots-36)	⠄ (braille pattern dots-3)

Paired punctuation:

Print	« ... »	( ... )
Braille	...	...

== Formatting ==
italics	capital	number
⠸ (braille pattern dots-456)	⠨ (braille pattern dots-46)	⠼ (braille pattern dots-3456)

== See also ==
- Ukrainian Braille
