= Ukrainian Braille =

Braille alphabet of the Ukrainian language

- Script type: alphabet
- Print basis: Ukrainian alphabet
- Languages: Ukrainian

Related scripts
- Parent systems: Braille: Russian Braille; Ukrainian Braille

Ukrainian Braille is the braille alphabet of the Ukrainian language. It is based on the Russian Braille, with a few additional letters found in the print Ukrainian alphabet.

== Alphabet ==
Ukrainian does not use all the letters of the Russian alphabet, and it has the additional letters є, ґ, і, ї.

Print	а a	б b	в v	г h	ґ g^{(?)}	д d	е e	є je	ж ž	з z	и y
Braille	⠁ (braille pattern dots-1)	⠃ (braille pattern dots-12)	⠺ (braille pattern dots-2456)	⠛ (braille pattern dots-1245)	⠻ (braille pattern dots-12456)	⠙ (braille pattern dots-145)	⠑ (braille pattern dots-15)	⠜ (braille pattern dots-345)	⠚ (braille pattern dots-245)	⠵ (braille pattern dots-1356)	⠊ (braille pattern dots-24)
Print	і i	ї ï	й j	к k	л l	м m	н n	о o	п p	р r	с s
Braille	⠽ (braille pattern dots-13456)	⠹ (braille pattern dots-1456)	⠯ (braille pattern dots-12346)	⠅ (braille pattern dots-13)	⠇ (braille pattern dots-123)	⠍ (braille pattern dots-134)	⠝ (braille pattern dots-1345)	⠕ (braille pattern dots-135)	⠏ (braille pattern dots-1234)	⠗ (braille pattern dots-1235)	⠎ (braille pattern dots-234)
Print	т t	у u	ф f	х kh	ц c	ч č	ш š	щ šč	ь ‘	ю yu	я ya
Braille	⠞ (braille pattern dots-2345)	⠥ (braille pattern dots-136)	⠋ (braille pattern dots-124)	⠓ (braille pattern dots-125)	⠉ (braille pattern dots-14)	⠟ (braille pattern dots-12345)	⠱ (braille pattern dots-156)	⠭ (braille pattern dots-1346)	⠾ (braille pattern dots-23456)	⠳ (braille pattern dots-1256)	⠫ (braille pattern dots-1246)

The letter ⠽ і was once found in Russian Braille, but has been dropped. ⠜ є is the mirror image of a reported archaic form of Russian э. (See obsolete letters of Russian Braille.)

⠻ g was reported in UNESCO (1990), but could not be confirmed by UNESCO (2013). It is not repeated by Leksika.com.

== Punctuation ==
Punctuation is from UNESCO (1990) and has not been confirmed.

Single punctuation:

Print	,	.	?	!	;	:	-	'
Braille	⠂ (braille pattern dots-2)	⠲ (braille pattern dots-256)	⠢ (braille pattern dots-26)	⠖ (braille pattern dots-235)	⠆ (braille pattern dots-23)	⠒ (braille pattern dots-25)	⠤ (braille pattern dots-36)	⠄ (braille pattern dots-3)

Paired punctuation:

Print	« ... »	( ... )
Braille	...	...

== Formatting ==
italics	capital	number
⠸ (braille pattern dots-456)	⠨ (braille pattern dots-46)	⠼ (braille pattern dots-3456)

== Numbers ==
Numbers are the letters a–j introduced with ⠼, as in other braille alphabets.

== See also ==
- Belarusian Braille
