= George S. N. Luckyj =

Ukrainian writer and historian (1919–2001)

George Stephen Nestor Luckyj
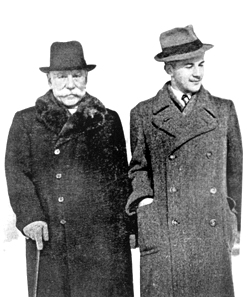
- George (i.e. Yuriy) Luckyj and his grandfather Stepan Smal-Stotsky in Prague, 1937
- Born: Юрій Луцький (transcribed: Yuriy Lutskyy); 1919; Yanchyn, now Ivanivka, Lviv Oblast
- Died: November 22, 2001 (aged 81–82); Toronto
- Education: University of Berlin
- Occupations: Literary scholar; writer; professor

George Stephen Nestor Luckyj (born Юрій Луцький, transcribed: Yuriy Lutskyyyn; 1919 – 22 November 2001) was a scholar of Ukrainian literature, who greatly contributed to the awareness of Ukrainian literature in the English-speaking world and to the continuation of legitimate scholarship on the subject during the post-war period.

== Biography ==
Luckyj was born in 1919 in the village Yanchyn, today Ivanivka, close to Lviv. His father was Ostap Luckyj, a Ukrainian modernist poet and member of the Polish Senate, and his mother was Irena Smal-Stotska, daughter of Stepan Smal-Stotsky, a Ukrainian philologist and Austrian parliament member.

After studying German literature at the University of Berlin, he went to England right before World War II for a summer program at Cambridge University. After the Soviet occupation of Western Ukraine, formerly Poland, in 1939, his father was taken by the NKVD and eventually died in a concentration camp. In 1943, Luckyj joined the British army and worked as a Russian interpreter in occupied Germany.

In 1947, he moved to Saskatoon, Canada for a position teaching English literature at the University of Saskatchewan. After two years he moved to New York to pursue a doctorate at Columbia University. His Ph.D. dissertation became the key Ukrainian literary scholarly text, Literary Politics in the Soviet Ukraine, 1917–1934. He participated in the activities of the Ukrainian Academy of Arts and Sciences, an important scholarly institution begun by Ukrainian émigrés in New York.

He became a professor at the University of Toronto and was involved in the creation of the Canadian Institute of Ukrainian Studies and Canadian Association of Slavists. His writing, both scholarly and of translation, was prodigious until his death in 2001.

== Awards ==
- Antonovych prize (1998)

== Translations ==
Luckyj was well known for his translations of Ukrainian literature, which have exposed large new audiences to its depth and quality.

- The Hunters and the Hunted, Ivan Bahrianyi (1954, 1956)
- Iwan Majstrenko's Borotbism: A Chapter in the History of Ukrainian Communism (1954)
- Elie Borschak's Hryhor Orlyk: France's Cossack General (1956)
- Dmytro Doroshenko's "Survey of Ukrainian Historiography" (1957)
- Mykola Khvyliovy's Stories from the Ukraine (1960)
- Hryhory Kostiuk's Stalinist Rule in the Ukraine: A Decade of Mass Terror (1960) Internet
- George Y. Shevelov's Syntax of Modern Literary Ukrainian (1963)
- A Little Touch of Drama by Valerian Pidmohylny (1972)
- Panteleimon Kulish's 1857 Black Council (1973)
- Mykola Kulish's Sonata Pathètique (1975)
- Yevhen Sverstiuk's Clandestine Essays (1976)
- Mykhailo Kotsiubyns'kyi's Shadows of Forgotten Ancestors (1981)
- Pavlo Zaitsev's Taras Shevchenko: A Life (1988)
