= Theodor Gartner =

Austrian romanist and philologist (1843–1925)

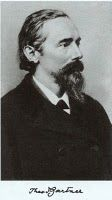
- Born: 4 November 1843
- Died: 29 April 1925 (aged 81)

Theodor Gartner (4 November 1843 — 29 April 1925) was an Austrian linguist, Romance philologist and professor.

== Biography ==
He is also known for his study of the Ukrainian language and as a co-author (with Stepan Smal-Stotsky) of the monograph and textbook on the grammar of the Ukrainian language. After graduating from the University of Vienna, from 1868 to 1885 he taught in schools in Hungary. Since 1885, he was a professor of Romance Philology at the University of Chernivtsi. He conducted studies of Romanian accents on the territory of Bukovina.

Living among Ukrainians, he got interested in their language, first of all in grammar, phonetics and vocabulary. He studied Ukrainian language under the guidance of Stepan Smal-Stotsky, the head of Ukrainian language and literature department. Studying with textbooks of that time, he found a certain inconsistency and contradictions in them. In co-authorship with Smal-Stotsky, he published in Vienna the work "Grammatik der Ruthenischen Sprache" ("Grammar of the Ruthenian [i. e. Ukrainian] Language", 1913).

In addition, together with Smal-Stotsky he wrote the textbook for secondary schools "Ruska Grammatika" ("Ruthenian [i. e. Ukrainian] Grammar", Chernivtsi, 1893), which had four editions and until 1928 served as a textbook on the Ukrainian language in secondary schools in Galicia and Bukovyna. He participated in the drawing up of spelling in the Western Ukraine on the phonetic principle, as opposed to the existing etymological one. In his works he insisted that the Ukrainian language comes directly from the Proto-Slavic language, and not from the Old Russian language, he proved its kinship with the Serbian language, which caused sharp criticism and debate.

Since 1899 he was a professor of French at University of Chernivtsi, then – until 1913 – he was head of newly founded department of romance philology at Innsbruck University. Since 1897, he was an honorable member of the Academic Brotherhood "Arminia" in Chernivtsi. He authored a number of works on the Hungarian and Romani language.
