= Stepan Smal-Stotsky =

Ukrainian linguist and economist (1859–1938)

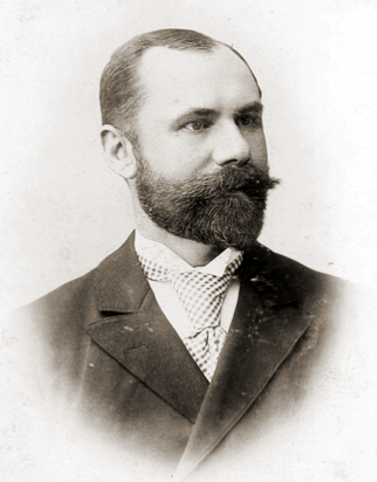
Portrait

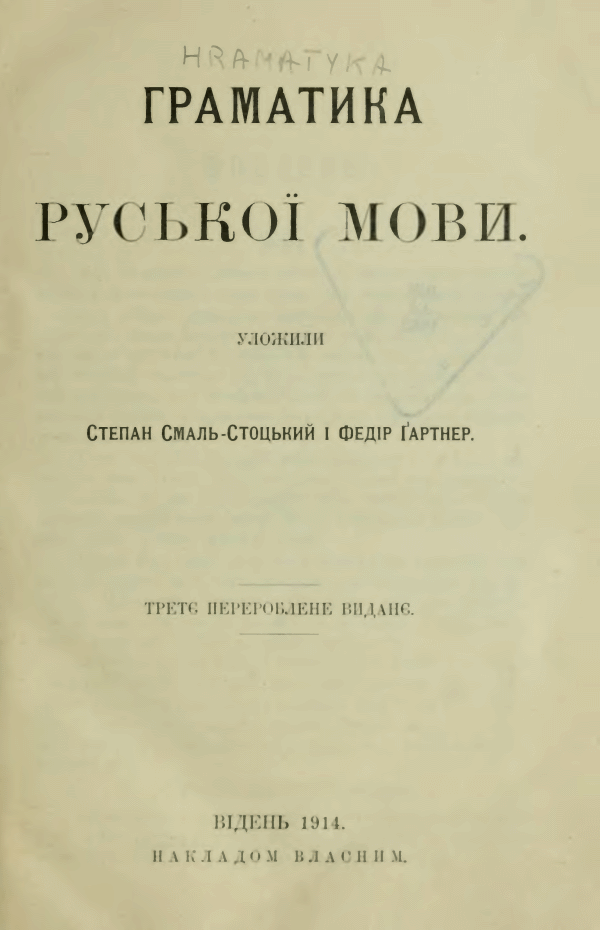
Ruthenian (Ukrainian) language grammar

Stepan Yosypovych Smal-Stotsky (Ukrainian: Степан Йосипович Смаль-Стоцький, Polish: Stepan Smal-Stocki) was a Ukrainian linguist and academician, Slavist, cultural and political figure, member of the Union for the Liberation of Ukraine, and ambassador of the West Ukrainian People's Republic in Prague.

His doctorate on Slavic philology was accepted by Franz Miklosich at the University of Vienna in 1885.

Smal-Stotsky was the father of Roman Smal-Stocki and a grandfather of George S. N. Luckyj.

== Works ==
- Ruthenian language grammar (Граматика Руської мови; Hramatyka Ruskoyi movy). Ed.3. Vienna, 1914 (together with Theodor Gartner)
- Nemoliv. Memoirs. "Piramida". Lviv, 2013.

=== Monographs ===
- Ruthenian orthography (Руська правопись; Ruska pravopys). 1891-1893.
- Ruthenian grammar (Руська граматика; Ruska hramatyka). 1893.
- Bukovynian Ruthenia (Rus). Cultural and Historical Overview (Буковинська Русь. Культурно-історичний образок; Bukovynska Rus. Kulturno-istorychnyi obrazok). 1897.
