= Irene Zazians =

Iranian actress (1927–2012)

- Իրեն Զազյանց
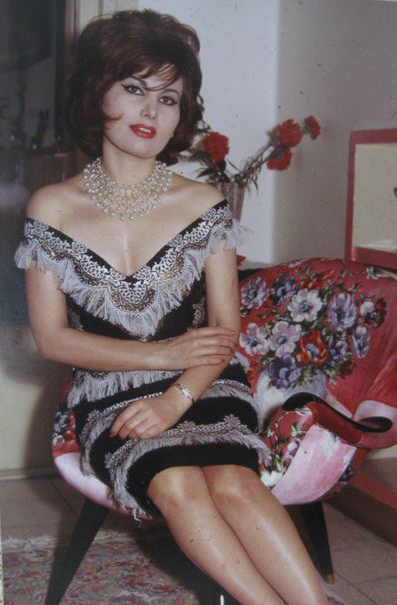
- Irene Zazians portrait, from Etela'at-e Haftegi magazine, 1950s
- Born: August 20, 1927; Babolsar, Imperial State of Persia
- Died: July 28, 2012 (aged 84); Tehran, Iran
- Resting place: Burastan Cemetery
- Other name: Irene Asemi
- Occupation: Actress
- Years active: 1948–1982
- Spouses: Mohammad Assemi; Shahrokh Rafi

Irene Zazians (Armenian: Իրեն Զազյանց; Persian: ایرن زازیانس; August 20, 1927 – July 28, 2012), known mononymously as Irene, was an Iranian actress of cinema and television. She worked with famous Iranian new wave directors both before and after the 1979 revolution, such as Samuel Khachikian, Amir Naderi, Nosrat Karimi, Masoud Kimiyayi, and Alireza Davood Nejad. Her two films after the revolution, The Red Line directed by Kimiyayi and The Reward by Davood Nejad, were banned in Iran.

Zazians also appeared in four TV series. She portrayed Mahde Olya (Nasereddin Shah's mother) in Soltan-e Sahebgheran directed by Ali Hatami in 1976. Her role in Hezar Dastan, another series directed by Ali Hatami, was cut out.

After the 1979 Iranian revolution she was banned from taking part in any artistic activities. She travelled to Germany, where she re-trained as a beautician. She returned to Iran in 1986, during the harshest time of the Iran-Iraq war. Her last performance in cinema was in Shirin in 2008, a film by Abbas Kiarostami. She died of lung cancer in 2012 in Tehran.

== Early life and career ==
Irene was born in an Armenian family who had immigrated to Babolsar, Iran, after surviving the Armenian genocide by the Ottoman Turks. Her father was Alexander Zazians and her mother's name was Varia. Her father was from Western Armenia, while her mother was from the east. Irene was their fourth child, but all of the first three children died of causes such as disease. She went to "Shahdokht" school in Babolsar. She started acting in the Ferdowsi theater when she was 19. In 1951 she joined the Noushin group in Sa'di theater, performing in works including Oscar Wilde's Lady Windermere's Fan. She married Mohammad Asemi, also an actor in the Noushin theater, when she was 16.

== Film career ==
After some years in theater she joined the cinema industry in 1958, acting in films such as The Man who Suffered directed by Mohammad Ali Jafari and Awaited by Ataollah Zahed.

"In that time (1950s in Iran) Italian films were on top and people were so passionate about Silvana Mangano and Sophia Loren. But after screening "The Messenger from Heaven" Italian films were put behind for a while. "

— Irene, on The Messenger from Heaven

Her next film was The Messenger from Heaven directed by Samuel Khachikian, also an Iranian Armenian. At the time Iranian women could not act in sexy clothes, but because Irene was of an Armenian family, she did not have that limitation and wore a two-piece swim suit in The Messenger from Heaven. The film was on screen for four days, but then was renditioned five times for its taboo scenes. In 1958 Siamak Yasemi invited her to perform in a movie named The Spring of Life. This was Mohammad Ali Fardin's first film. In the early 1970s she worked with many Iranian new wave directors such as Amir Naderi (Goodbye Friend), Masoud Kimiyai (Baluch), Khosrow Haritash (Speeding Naked till High Noon) and Shapoor Gharib (The Rooster).

=== Mohallel ===
Among her most acclaimed and controversial roles was the portrayal of a traditional Iranian Muslim woman in Mohallel while she was Armenian. The Islamic term mohallel (Nikah halala) refers to a man marrying a divorced woman so that she can marry her ex-husband after they have already divorced three times. Couples cannot remarry for a fourth time until the ex-wife marries another man, to ensure that divorce is not taken lightly.

Nosrat Karimi directed the film Mohallel in 1972. After all Iranian stars rejected the role, he turned to Irene, an Armenian. She spent time in a traditional Iranian household to observe their lifestyle. However, some Shia mojtaheds such as Morteza Motahhari wrote bitter criticisms of the film in Kayhan. Other critics defended Irene's performance, and Zazians was nominated for a Sepas award that year. The film only remained on screens for three days and was renditioned.

== Television career ==
Irene portrayed Mahd-e Olya, the mother of Nasereddin Shah in the TV series, Soltan-e Sahebgheran directed by Ali Hatami in 1974

Zazians played in four TV series. One was Soltan-e Sahebgheran, a historical TV series about Nasereddin shah Qajar and Amirkabir and their assassination. Zazians portrayed Mahd-e Olya, Shah's mother in the series. Another TV series was Abunasr's Throne (Persian: تخت ِ ابونصر), based on a story of Sadegh Hedayat and a screenplay by Ahmad Shamlu. Her latter two series were I Love You, I Love You, directed by Morteza Alavi, and Hezar Dastan, also by Ali Hatami, which was screened after the Iranian revolution with her role being totally cut out.

== Personal life ==
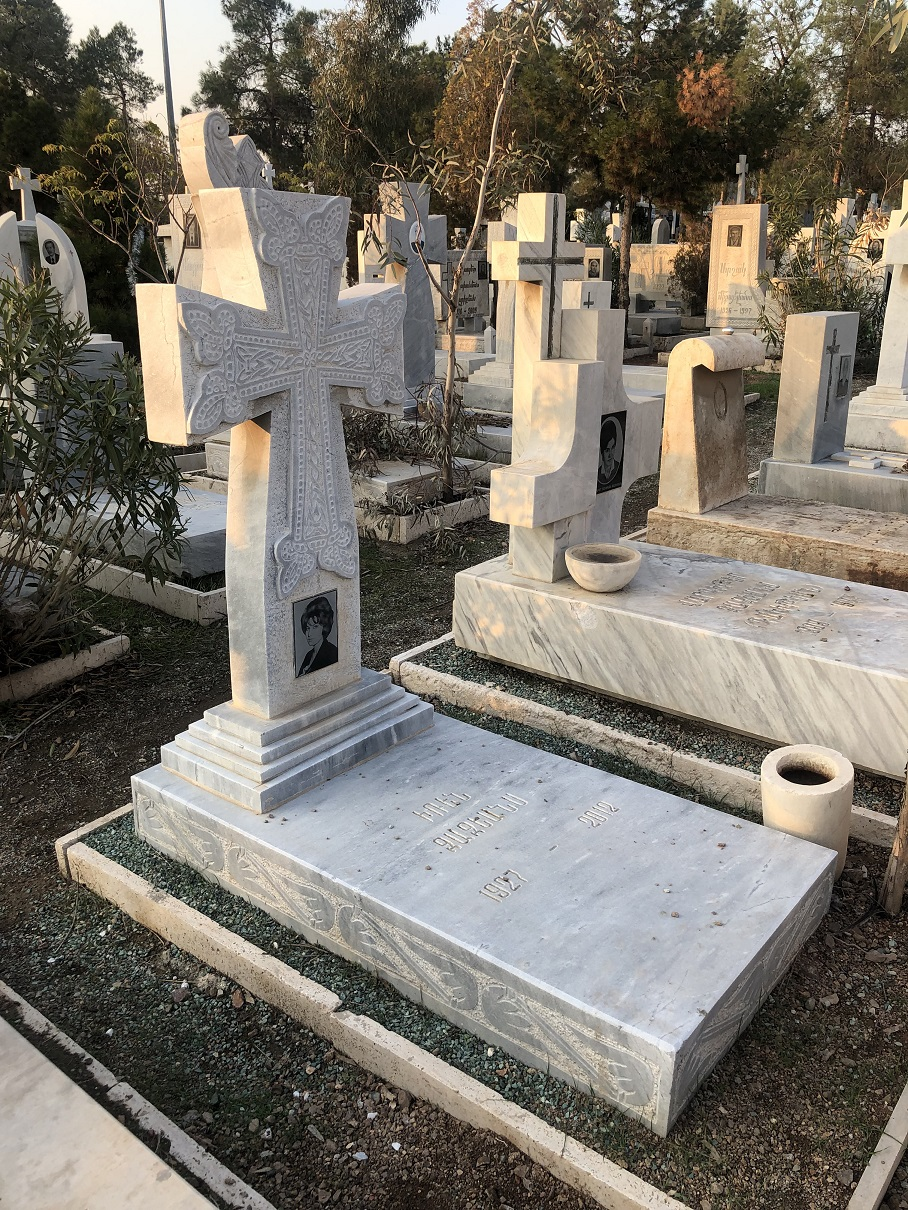
Irene grave at Khavaran, Tehran

Zazians married twice; first when she was age 16, to Mohammad Asemi, an actor in the Noushin group. Asemi was also a poet and a writer and was a member of Tudeh Party of Iran. Their marriage was not stable and they got divorced. From this marriage, Irene was sometimes called Irene Asemi, her ex-husband's family name. After that, she married director and producer, Shahrokh Rafi which also ended in divorce.

After the Iranian Revolution Irene was banned from performing as an actress, so she travelled to Germany to live with her sister. She only stayed there for two years and returned to Iran in 1986. During her time in Germany, she had retrained in cosmetology and, after coming back to Iran, she also worked as a beautician.

== Death ==
Zazians suffered lung cancer in the last decade of her life. She had three surgeries and was working less, as recommended by her doctors. She died on July 28, 2012, in Tehran. She is buried in the Armenian cemetery in Khavaran road in southeast Tehran.

== Filmography ==
Irene Zazians' filmography
Year	Title	Persian Title	Role	Director	Notes
1958	The Man Who Suffered	مردی که رنج می‌برد		Mohammad Ali Jafari	
1958	Awaited	چشم‌به‌راه		Ataollah Zahed	
1959	The Messenger from Heaven	قاصد بهشت		Samuel Khachikian	Renditioned
1960	The Spring of Life	چشمه‌ آب حیات		Siamak Yasemi	
1961	The Black Pearl	مروارید سیاه		Mehdi Reisfirooz	
1962	The Shadow of the Fate	سایه‌ سرنوشت		Esmaeel Kooshan	
1963	Dread	دلهره	Roshanak Niknezhad	Samuel Khachikian	
1963	The Shore is not far	ساحل دور نیست	Simin	Sardar Saker	
1969	Noah's Arc	کشتی نوح	Leyla	Khosrow Parvizi	
1971	The Son of Zayandeh Roud	پسر زاینده‌رود		Hosein Madani	
1972	Subah-o-Shyam	همای سعادت		Tapi Chanakya	Indo-Iranian film
1972	Amoo Yadegar	عمو یادگار		Parviz Kardan	
1972	Khodahafez Rafigh	خداحافظ رفیق		Amir Naderi	
1972	Nikah Halala	محلل	Shamsi	Nosrat Karimi	Renditioned
1972	The Triple Bed	تخت‌خواب سه‌نفره		Nosrat Karimi	
1973	The Doctor	حکیم‌باشی		Parviz Noori	
1973	Balouch	بلوچ	Farangis	Masoud Kimiyai	
1974	The Rooster	خروس	The Woman	Shapoor Gharib	
1974	The Translator Akbar	اکبر دیلماج	Akbar's wife	Khosrow Parvizi	
1974	Chasing to Hell	تعقیب تا جهنم		Robert Ekhart	
1975	Red Hair	موسرخه	Nayyer	Abdollah Ghiabi	
1976	Dotted Daddy	بابا خال‌دار	Abdol's mother	Masoud Asadollahi	
1977	Anxiety	اضطراب	Shahla	Samuel Khachikian	
1977	The Last Supper	شام آخر	Esmat	Shahyar Ghanbari	
1977	Speeding Naked till High Noon	برهنه تا ظهر با سرعت		Khosrow Haritash	
1980	The Friend's Stabbing	زخم خنجر رفیق		Azizollah Bahadori	
1980	Soltan-e Sahebgharan	سلطان صاحبقران	Mahd-e Olya	Ali Hatami	television series
1984	The Reward	جایزه		Alireza Davood Nejad	banned in Iran
1984	The Red Line	خط قرمز	Lale's mother	Masoud Kimiai	banned in Iran
2008	Shirin	شیرین	Herself	Abbas Kiarostami	

== See also ==
- Persian theatre
- Ferdowsi Theatre
- Saadi Theatre
