= Loreta (actress) =

- لرتا هايراپتيان تبريزى
- Born: Loreta Hairapedian Tabrizi; 1911; Tehran, Iran
- Died: March 29, 1998 (aged 86–87); Vienna, Austria
- Education: Moscow State University
- Occupations: stage and film Actress
- Spouse: Abdol Hossein Noushin (1934-1971, his death)
- Children: Kaveh

Loreta Hairapedian Tabrizi (Armenian: Լորետա Հայրապետեան; Persian: لرتا هايراپتيان تبريزى) was an Iranian Armenian stage and film actress.

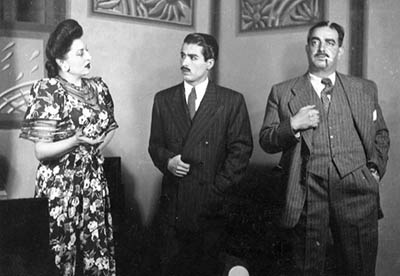
An Screenshot of Mardom play in 1940s. From right to left: Hoseyn Kheyrkhah, Mostafa Oskui and Loretta

== Biography ==
Loreta was born as Loreta Hairapedian Tabrizi in 1911 in Tehran. Following a succession of roles in performances of William Shakespeare directed by Vahram Arsen Papazian, she married the well-known stage director Abdolhossein Noushin and later joined the Iran Club of Theater. There, she appeared in grand scale performances of such plays as Othello, Volpone, The Blue Bird and Gas Light. In 1933, she married Abdol Hossein Noushin. In 1953 Loreta traveled abroad together with her husband following the 1953 coup d'etát, and the couple lived in Moscow for several years, where they both entered education; Loreta entered the acting school of the Moscow State University (Moscow Art Theatre), while her husband studied for a PhD in philology at the Maxim Gorky Literature Institute. When the couple returned to Iran after several years, Loreta broke into films and made six films the first of which was The Night of Execution (Davoud Mollapour, 1970). The list includes the co-production Bride of Fortune, as well as Ebrahim Golestan's Secrets of the Jinn Valley Treasure. Her only TV series was Khosrov-Mirza II (Nosrat Karimi). Loreta left Iran in 1979 together with her only son from her marriage with Noushin, and went to live in Vienna, Austria, where she died on 29 March 1998.

== Filmography ==
1. 1971 Subah-o-Shyam
2. 1972 The Triple Bed
3. 1974 Asrar ganj dareheye jenni

== Television ==
1. 1977 Khosrow Mirza-ye dovom (TV Mini-Series)

== See also ==
- Persian theatre
- Ferdowsi Theatre
- Saadi Theatre
