= Ferdowsi Theatre =

Theatre in Tehran, Iran

Ferdowsi Theatre (Persian: تئاتر فردوسی) was a theatre hall in the Lalehzar district in Tehran, Iran, founded in 1947 by Abdolhossein Noushin with the financial support of Mohammad-Ali Vasighi and Abdolkarim Amouei. Ferdowsi Theatre, which later became Ferdowsi Cinema was located in Melli Alley (later Barbad Alley). Its productions of European plays and its educational approach made it an important venue in the development of modern Iranian theatre.

Noushin's work at the theatre ended with his arrest in February 1949, but the venue reopened under new management and remained active until the 1953 coup. It was later reopened as Tafakori Theatre (Persian: تئاتر تفکری) and finally converted into Atlas Cinema.

== History ==
=== Establishment ===
Noushin had previously directed productions at Farhang Theatre in Lalehzar, but due to the disagreements with its investors and producers left the Theatre. Vasighi, who had also been involved in financing Farhang Theatre, joined Amouei in supporting a new hall for Noushin's theatre troupe. According to Morteza Rahimnavaz, the historian, Ferdowsi Theatre opened in November 1947. Its first production was Mostanteq, a Persian translation by Bozorg Alavi of J. B. Priestley's An Inspector Calls, directed by Noushin.

=== Stage practice and training ===
The theatre had a revolving stage, allowing scenery to be changed between acts without long interruptions. His company also gave importance to the stage design, costumes, make-up and lighting which was a new development in that era. Nosrat Karimi worked on make-up for productions at the theatre.

Noushin provided training for members of the company, including classes in acting and voice. He invited the literary scholar Parviz Natel-Khanlari to teach Persian literature and arranged music lessons for the performers.

=== Productions under Noushin ===
The company's repertoire was largely drawn from translated European drama. Some of the productions staged between November 1947 and February 1949 included:

- An Inspector Calls (Mostanteq) by J. B. Priestley, translated by Bozorg Alavi and directed by Noushin (November 1947).
- Volpone by Ben Jonson, directed by Noushin (January 1948).
- Rosemary, also known in Persian as Sargozasht (February 1948).
- Topaze by Marcel Pagnol, performed under the Persian title Mardom (March 1948).
- Majera-ye Khanevadeh-ye Lebanon (The Lebanon Family Affair), attributed in Iranian theatre histories to Edgar Wallace (April 1948).
- Se Dozd (Three Thieves) (May 1948).
- Dokhtar-e Shokolat-forush (The Chocolate Seller Girl), directed by Hossein Kheirkhah (June 1948).
- The Blue Bird by Maurice Maeterlinck, translated and directed by Noushin (December 1948).
- Gas Light by Patrick Hamilton, directed by Noushin (February 1949).

Gas Light was the last production Noushin directed at Ferdowsi Theatre before his arrest.

=== Closure and later management ===
Following an attempt on the life of Mohammad Reza Pahlavi on 4 February 1949, the Tudeh Party of Iran was banned. Noushin, who was associated with the party, was arrested and later sentenced to three years in prison, and Ferdowsi Theatre was temporarily closed.

The theatre then reopened under the management of Ali Sadri. Directors associated with this period included Napoleon Sarvarian, Mo'ezz al-Divan Fekri, Mehdi Gerami and Henrik Stepanyan.

The actress Irene Zazians began her stage career at Ferdowsi Theatre in 1949, appearing in Karmand-e Sharif (The Honourable Employee). She later worked at Saadi Theatre, which had been established by former associates of Noushin.

=== Later use of the premises ===
The building was damaged during the 1953 coup. In May 1954, the comedian and actor Asghar Tafakori acquired the right from the investors to operate the theatre and renovated it. It reopened in July 1954 as Tafakori Theatre, with a production of The Merchant of Venice. The venue later became associated with popular comedy and musical entertainment. After Tafakori's death in June 1960, the building were sold to the film producer Mohammad Arbab and converted into Atlas Cinema.

== Associated performers ==
Performers associated with Ferdowsi Theatre during Noushin's period included Loreta, Hossein Kheirkhah, Ezzatolah Entezami, Nosrat Karimi, Mahin Deyhim, Fereydoun Deyhim, Mahin Oskouei, Gholamhossein Mofid, Mostafa Oskouei, Touran Mehrzad, Hassan Khashe' and Sadegh Shabaviz.

== See also ==
- Persian theatre
- Laleh-Zar Street
- Abdolhossein Noushin
