= List of Rah Ahan F.C. managers =

The following is a list of managers of Rah Ahan and their major honours from the beginning of the club's official managerial records from 1937 to the present day. The first manager of the club was Rasoul Madadnoei. The current manager is Hamid Estili since 26 June 2014.

== List of managers since 1937 ==
- (Iran) Rasoul Madadnoei (1937–40)
- (Iran) Amir Aboutaleb (1940–42)
- (Iran) Parviz Aboutaleb (1942–45)
- (Soviet Union) Ivan Konov (1945–50)
- (Iran) Ardeshir Laroudi (1950–51)
- (Iran) Asghar Taghibeig (1951)
- (Iran) Mohamad Eshaghzadeh (1951–53)
- (Iran) Nasser Ebrahimi (1953–56)
- (Iran) Ghasem Tabibi (1956–75)
- (Iran) Amir Aboutaleb (1975–76)
- (Iran) Reza Vatankhah (1976–82)
- (Iran) Ahmad Tousi (1982–85)
- (Iran) Iraj Ghelichkhani (1985–86)
- (Iran) Ali Givehei (1986–87)
- (Iran) Majid Janani (1987–90)
- (Iran) Masoud Eghabli (1990–96)
- (Iran) Behrouz Tabani (1996–2000)
- (Iran) Mostafa Ghanbarpour (July 2000–July 2002)
- (Iran) Hamid Derakhshan (July 2002–June 2003)
- (Iran) Abbas Mousivand (June 2003–June 2004)
- (Iran) Firouz Karimi (June 2004–Feb 2006)
- (Iran) Behrooz Tabani (March 2006–May 2006)
- (Iran) Abbas Razavi (June 2006–Nov 2006)
- (Iran) Akbar Misaghian (Dec 2006–Feb 2008)
- (Iran) Davoud Mahabadi (March 2008–Oct 2008)
- (Iran) Mahmoud Yavari (Oct 2008–April 2009)
- (Iran) Mehdi Tartar (Apr 2009–June 2009)
- (Netherlands) Ernie Brandts (Jul 1, 2009–Dec 2009)
- (Iran) Mehdi Tartar (Dec 2009–Jun 2010)
- (Iran) Rasoul Korbekandi (June 2010–Sept 2010)
- (Iran) Mehdi Tartar (Sept 2010–Jul 2011)
- (Iran) Ali Daei (July 2011–May 2013)
- (Iran) Mansour Ebrahimzadeh (Jul 2013–Jul 2014)
- (Iran) Hamid Estili (Jul 2014–2015)

== Current coaching staff ==
As of June 2014

Position	Name
Head Coach	(Iran) Hamid Estili
Assistant Coach	(Iran) Ali Latifi
Assistant Coach	(Croatia) Željko Mijač
Assistant Coach	(Armenia) Levon Stepanyan
Goalkeeping Coach	(Iran) Mehdi Basharzad
Fitness Coach	(Iran) Mohammad Reza Molaei
Doctor	(Iran) Dr. Alireza Haghighat
Analyzer	(Iran) Javad Manafi
B team Coach	(Iran) Edmond Bezik

== See also ==
- Sorinet F.C.
