= Saadi Theatre =

Saadi Theatre (Persian: تئاتر سعدی, also spelled Sa'di Theatre) was a theatre in Tehran, Iran. Established in 1950 with financial support of Abdolkarim Amouei, it was associated with the troupe of Abdolhossein Noushin, especially the actress and director Loreta and the actor Hossein Kheirkhah. The auditorium had a reported capacity of approximately 500 seats and was equipped with a revolving stage.

The theatre staged Persian productions of European plays, beginning with Oscar Wilde's Lady Windermere's Fan. It was closed by police in 1951, and was destroyed during the 1953 coup.

== History ==
=== Foundation and early performances ===
Saadi Theatre was established after Noushin's work at Ferdowsi Theatre was interrupted. Noushin, a member of the Tudeh Party of Iran, had been imprisoned following an attempt to assassinate Mohammad Reza Shah Pahlavi in February 1949. Loreta, Noushin's wife, and fellow members of his troupe continued their work at a new venue financed by Amouei. Although imprisoned, and later in hiding, Noushin remained involved in selection of plays, casting and advising the company through Loreta.

Saadi Theatre opened in the autumn of 1950-51 with Wilde's Lady Windermere's Fan, directed by Loreta. Amongst the cast was Irene Zazians, also known as Irene Asemi. The venue was located on Shahabad Street, between Baharestan and Mokhber al-Dowleh in central Tehran.

=== Closure and licensing dispute ===
In late 1951, police prevented the theatre from staging Shenel-e Qermez (The Red Cape). The dispute concerned the venue's operating permit, although the theatre's representatives argued that permission had previously been granted. Members of the theatre protested at the National Consultative Assembly, and some undertook a hunger strike. Finally the Ministry of the Interior issued a theatre licence in Amouei's name.

=== Destruction in 1953 ===
Saadi Theatre was attacked and burnt down during the coup of 19 August 1953. The destruction brought the company's work at the venue to an end, and some of the actors were imprisoned.

== Legacy ==
The theatre converted into Saadi Cinemain 1957. The cinema was amongst several venues in Tehran affected by fires in April 1969.

== See also ==
- Ferdowsi Theatre
- Persian theatre
- Abdolhossein Noushin
