= Ebrahim Monshizadeh =

Iranian political activist (1879–1918)

- ابراهیم منشی زاده
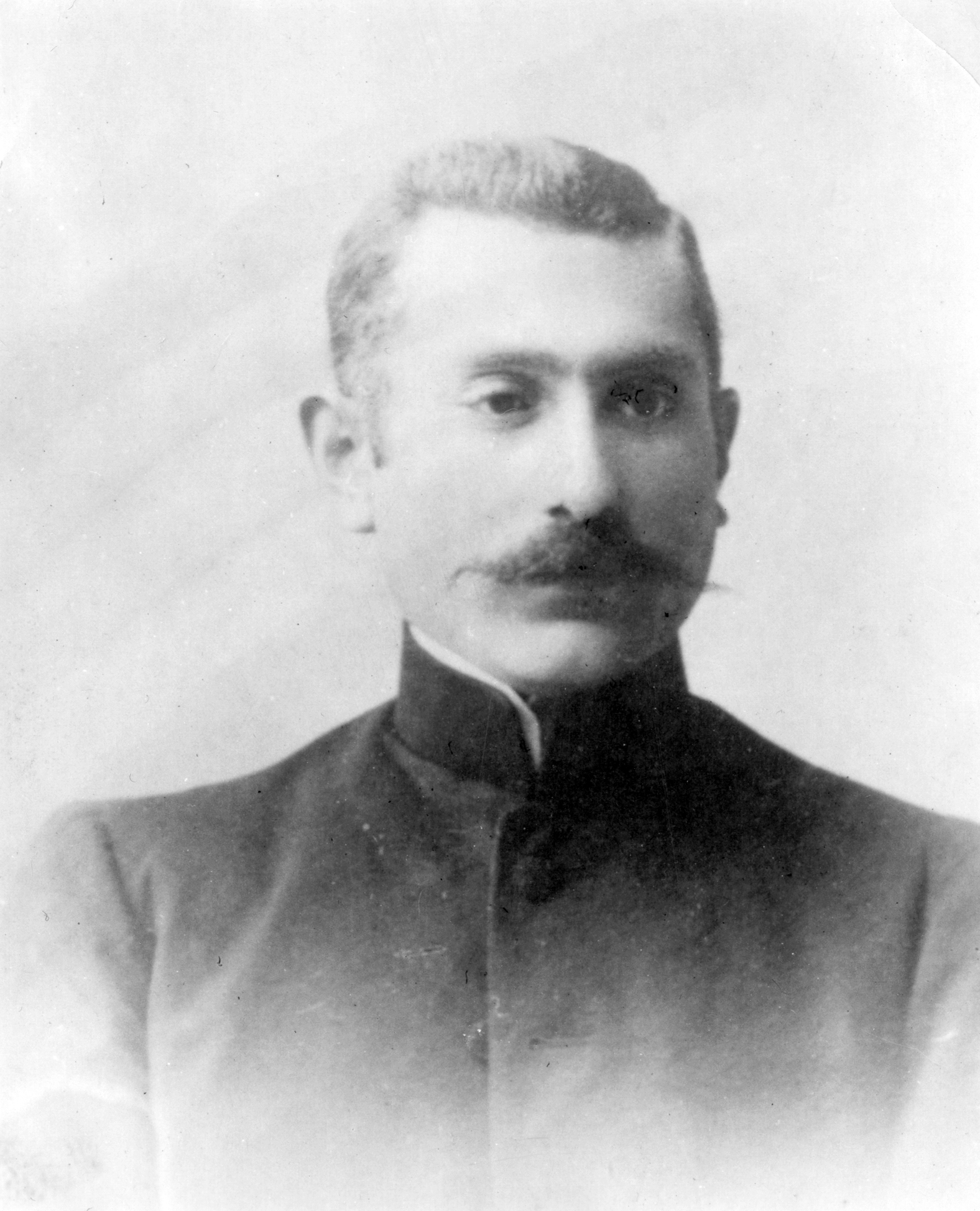
- Born: 1879; Erivan (Yerevan), Russian Empire
- Died: 1918 (aged 38–39); Damghan, Qajar Iran
- Cause of death: Gunshot
- Education: Dar ul-Funun
- Era: Qajar era
- Movement: Constitutional revolution
- Children: Davud Monshizadeh
- Father: Karim Khan Monshizadeh

Ebrahim Monshizadeh (Persian: ابراهیم منشی زاده; 1879–1918) was an Iranian political activist and the founder of the Punishment Committee. He was the father of the Iranian Nazi figure Davud Monshizadeh.

== Life ==
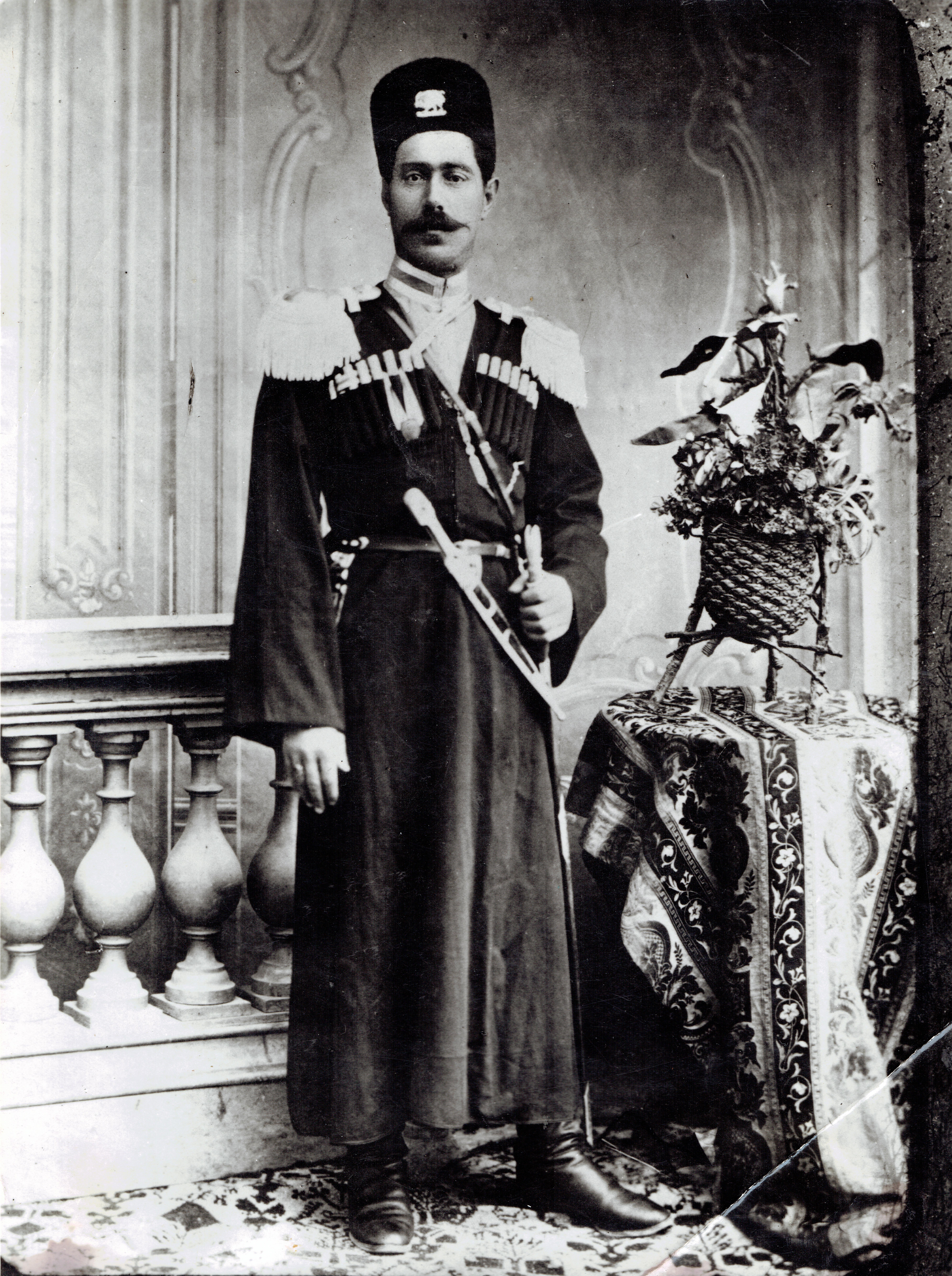
Karim Khan Monshizadeh, Ebrahim Monshizadeh's father

Born in Erivan (Yerevan) within the Russian Empire to a family originally from Shiraz, he belonged to a lineage that had relocated from Shiraz to Erivan during the Safavid period. He lived in Yerevan until 1889 when he and his father, Karim Khan Monshizadeh, moved to Iran. After moving to Iran, he studied at the Dar al-Fonun, and started political activity after his father was poisoned to death by Qajar officials. He took part in the Constitutional Revolution, where he joined the constitutionalists of Gilan.

He founded the punishment committee on 1 September 1916, along with Asadallah Khan Abolfath Zadeh. He was later arrested and exiled to Kalat-e Naderi, but was killed on the way by the order of Vosugh od-Dowleh in Damghan.

Davud Monshizadeh, founder of the far right Iranian party SUMKA was his son.
