= Aboutaleb =

Aboutaleb is an Arabic surname. Notable people with the surname include:

- A. A. AbouTaleb, Egyptian squash player
- Ahmed Aboutaleb (born 1961), Dutch-Moroccan politician and mayor of Rotterdam
- Parviz Aboutaleb (1942–2020), Iranian football player and manager
- Saeid Aboutaleb (born 1969), Iranian documentary filmmaker and politician
