= Deyhim =

Deyhim may refer to:

- Mahin Deyhim, Iranian actress
- Sussan Deyhim, Iranian-American composer
- Deyhīm, Persian ribboned headband
