= Punishment Committee =

Secret organization in Iran

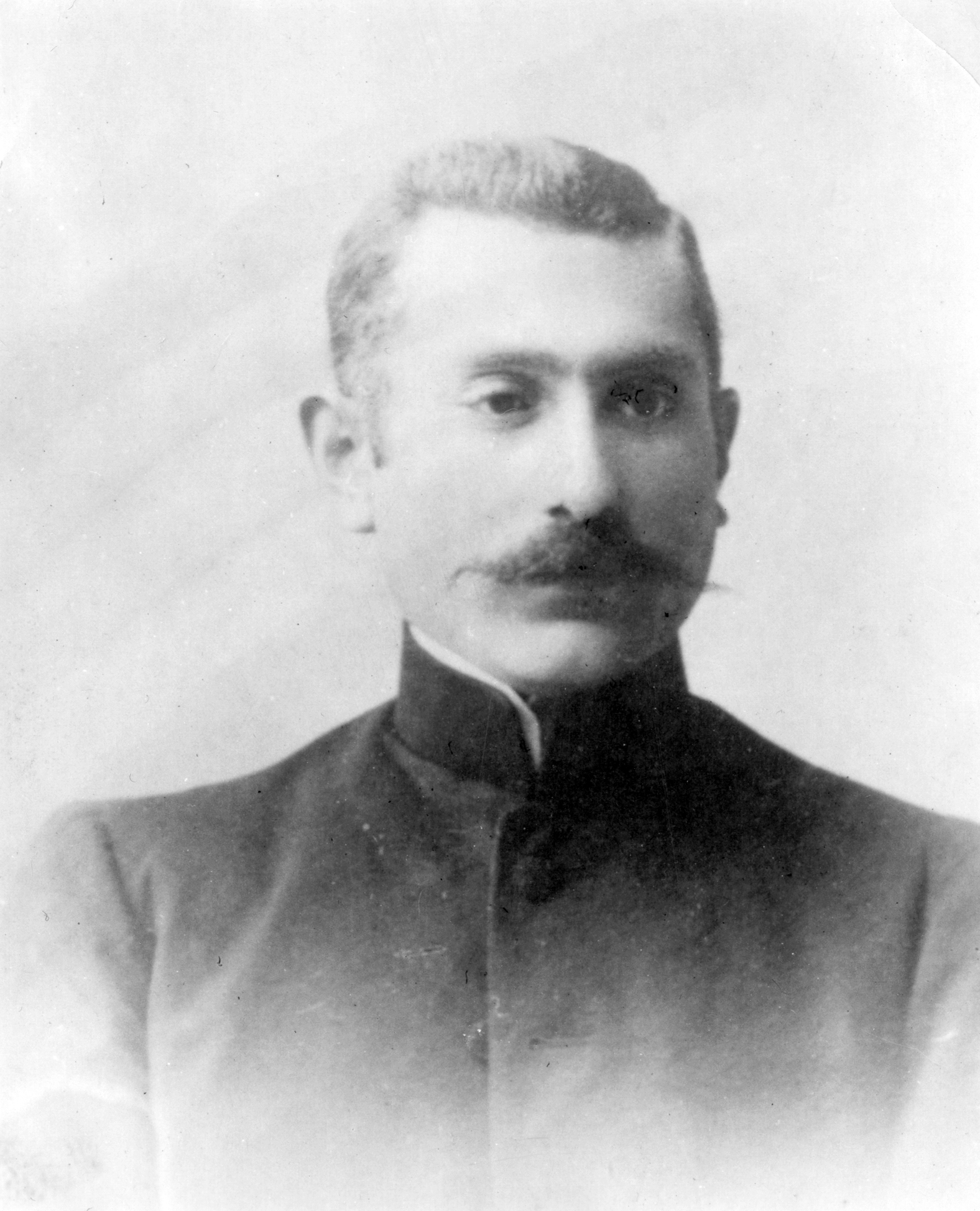
Ebrahim Monshizadeh, one of the committee's founders

The Punishment Committee (Persian: کمیته مجازات) was a secret organization existing in the last years of the reign of Qajar dynasty in Iran. The organization's goal was to assassinate people who they considered to be traitors and foreign agents.

The committee was dissolved on 13 July 1917, after its members were arrested and punished.

== History ==
Founded on 1 September 1916, the organizations original founders were three people named Ebrahim Monshizadeh, Asadallah Khan Abolfath Zadeh and Mohammad Nazar Khan Mashkut al-Mamalek.

The first target of the organization was the head of Tehran's granary, named Mirza Esmail Khan, whose relations with the British and possible sale of grain to the British and Russian forces incurred the wrath of the committee. He was assassinated by Karim Davatgar, who was hired to carry out the deed.

Karim Davatgar himself fell victim to the organization as the second person to be killed, and was assassinated by Rashid as-Soltan on 2 May 1917.

Other people assassinated by the organizations were:

- Matin As-Saltaneh, former parliament member and treasurer, 22 May 1917
- Mirza Mohsen Mojtahed, former parliament member, 7 June 1917.
- Montakheb ad-Dowleh, treasurer, 8 June 1917
- Mirza Ahmad Khan Ostovar
- Ahmad Khan Safa
- Sardar Rashid

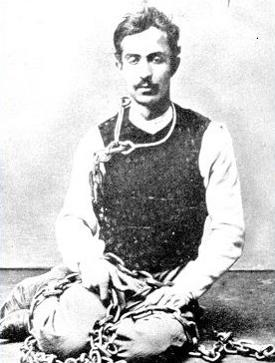
Karim Davatgar

== Members ==
- Ebrahim Monshizadeh
- Asadallah Khan Abolfath Zadeh
- Mohammad Nazar Khan Mashkut al-Mamalek
- Karim Davatgar
- Emad al-Kottab
- Rashid as-Soltan
- Kamal al-Vezareh
- Hossein Khan Allah
- Ali Akbar Ardaghi
- Ehsanollah Khan Dustdar
- Seyyed Morteza
- Mirza Abdolhossein Sa'atsaz
- Bahador as-Saltaneh
- Akbar Khan

== In popular culture ==
The committee was featured in the popular Iranian series Hezar Dastan.
