= Portrait of a Lady Far Away =

2005 film by Ali Mosaffa

- سیمای زنی در دوردست
- Directed by: Ali Mosaffa
- Written by: Ali Mosaffa, Safi Yazdanian
- Starring: Leila Hatami; Homayoun Ershadi; Zahra Hatami
- Cinematography: Homayun Payvar
- Release date: 2005
- Country: Iran
- Language: Persian

Portrait of a Lady Far Away (Persian: سیمای زنی در دوردست, romanized: Sima-ye zani dar doordast) is a 2005 film by the Iranian actor-director Ali Mosaffa. This was Mosaffa's directorial debut, and he also co-wrote the script with Safi Yazdanian. Homayun Payvar lensed the film, which starred Leila Hatami, Homayoun Ershadi and Zahra Hatami in the principal roles.

The film was shortlisted for the Sutherland Trophy, awarded to the director of the most original first feature film screened at The Times BFI London Film Festival. His first feature film subsequently won the People's Choice Award at the Chicago International Film Festival and was nominated for the Crystal Globe at the 2005 Karlovy Vary International Film Festival.

== Cast ==
- Homayoun Ershadi
- Leila Hatami
- Zahra Hatami
- Zhila Sohrabi
