= Topoli (film) =

- Film poster
- Directed by: Reza Mirlohi
- Produced by: Homayoun; Iraj Sadeghpour
- Starring: Homayun; Morteza Aghili; Zari Khoshkam; Zakaria Hashemi; Bahram Vatanparast; Arezou Ghaffari
- Cinematography: Iraj Sadeghpour
- Edited by: Iraj Sadeghpour
- Music by: Esfandiar Monfaredzadeh
- Release date: 1972
- Running time: 100 min
- Country: Iran
- Language: Persian

Topoli (in Persian: تپلی, literally: The Fatty) is a 1972 Iranian film directed by Reza Mirlohi. Morteza Aghili and Homayun play the main characters of the film. The script is based on the novel Of Mice and Men by John Steinbeck. The film is dedicated to John Steinbeck. The character of Topoli is loosely based on Lennie Small of Of Mice and Men as Essi is the Iranian version of George Milton in the novel.

== Plot ==
Topoli is an intellectually disabled fat man who lives with his cousin Essi. Topoli is interested in touching soft materials. His assault to their employer's daughter while attempting to touch her skirt causes them to have to run away. They are then employed in a wood-cutting factory in the north of Iran. The factory owner's wife seduces Topoli and he suffocates her unintentionally. Topoli and Essi rush into the jungle and the workers come after them. Bashir, the head-worker, is killed when he wants to side with them. Essi doesn't want Topoli to be tortured by the pursuing workers, so he shoots him, to spare him from suffering a worse fate.

== Cast ==
- Homayun as Topoli
- Morteza Aghili as Essi (Esmail)
- Zakaria Hashemi as Bashir
- Zari Khoshkam as The factory owner's wife
- Nematollah Gorji as Mirhosein
- Bahram Vatanparast as The factory owner
