= Zari Khoshkam =

Iranian actress (1947–2024)

- زری خوشکام
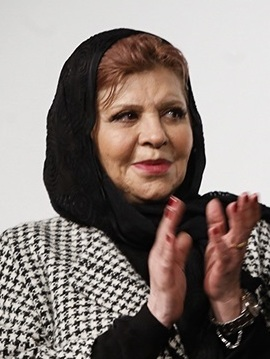
- Khoshkam in 2014
- Born: 30 December 1947; Isfahan, Imperial State of Iran
- Died: 16 May 2024 (aged 76)
- Other name: Zahra Hatami
- Education: National Ballet Organization (Iran)
- Occupation: Actress
- Years active: 1971–2016
- Spouse: Ali Hatami (m. 1971; died 1996)
- Children: Leila Hatami
- Relatives: Ali Mosaffa (son-in-law)

Zari Khoshkam (Persian: زری خوشکام; 30 December 1947 – 16 May 2024), also known as Zahra Hatami (Persian: زهرا حاتمی) in film circles, was an Iranian actress. She was the wife of filmmaker Ali Hatami and the mother of actress Leila Hatami.

Most of her film activities go back to the first two years of her career in cinema in 1971 and 1972. In these years, although she acted in films such as Adamak (آدمک) by Khosrow Haritash, Topoli (تپلی) by Reza Mirlohi and Khastegar (خواستگار) by Ali Hatami; however, in general, according to the conditions of Iranian cinema, it represented a special character (a seductive woman). Her film character changed after her marriage to Hatami, and after that she was not seen in cinema quite as often. In the years after the Revolution, she appeared under the name of Zahra Hatami in only a few works that were somehow related to her husband and family.

== Life and career ==
=== Early years ===
Zari Khoshkam was born in Isfahan in 1947. She completed her studies in Tehran and London and completed a four-year ballet course at Iran's National Ballet Organization. Her passion and interest for artistic works first opened her feet to dance and then she was attracted to cinema in 1971 at the age of 24.

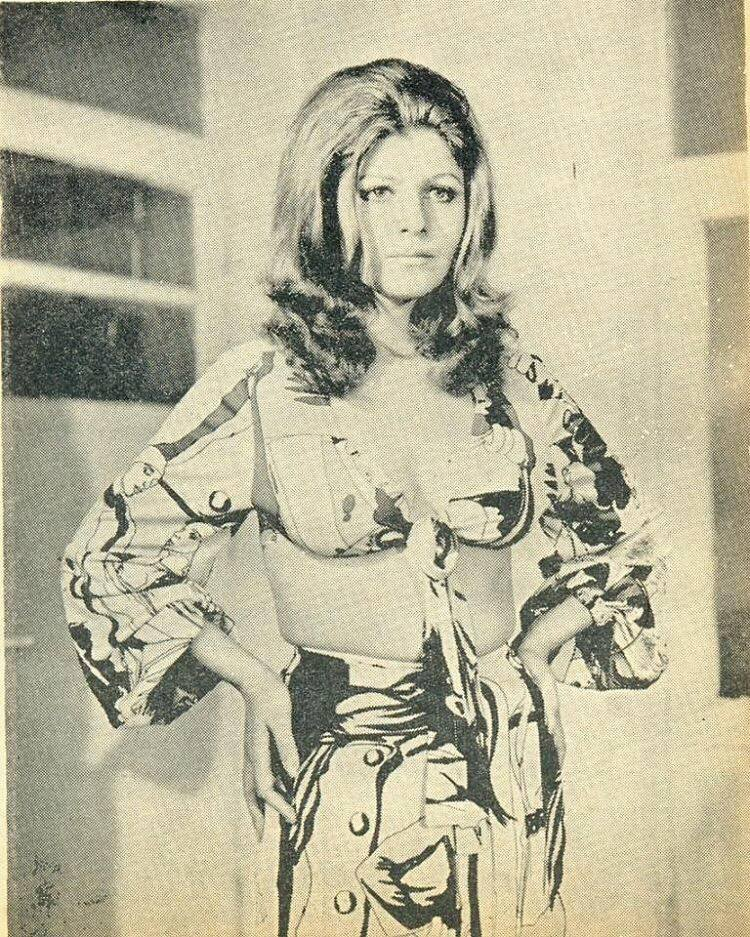
Zari Khoshkam in 1975

The beginning of her film career was with the film Adamak by Khosrow Haritash; however, she was introduced to the cinema with the film A Hut Across the River directed and filmed by Ahmed Shirazi and produced by Mohammad Ali Jafari. In this film, which was made and released in 1971, Zari played the role of a girl named Frank, who was brought back to life by a truck driver named Hossein Gabi after separating from her beloved son, Bijan. The roles of the male characters in this film were played by Naser Malek Motiei and Homayun Bahadran. Her participation in this film and her brilliance, which was not unrelated to her nude scenes, attracted the attention of many Iranian cinematographers. In fact, her talent in acting (with critics such as Alireza Nourizadeh later calling her one of the most talented actresses in Iranian cinema) along with her beauty and recklessness in accepting nude and provocative roles, led to many offers to play in Persian films. In this way, in the very first years of her career in Iranian cinema, in addition to participating in a large number of films, she experienced acting opposite most of the foremost young male stars of Persian films: among them playing roles opposite Nasser Malek Matiei (in the film A Hut Across the River), Mohammad Ali Fardin and Iraj Rostami (in the film Man of Thousand Smiles directed by Siamak Yasemi in 1971), Behrouz Thawqi and Bahman Mofid in Rashid (directed by Parviz Noori in 1971), Saeed Rad and Mohammad Ali Jafari (in the film Alkali directed by Mohammad Ali Jafari in 1971), and Iraj Qadri in the film Toba (directed by Ismail Poursaid in 1972). In these years, she also appeared in different artistic films known as the New Wave of Iranian cinema, such as Adamak by Khosrow Haritash in 1998, Topoli by Reza Mirlohi in 1999 based on Of Mice and Men by John Steinbeck, and Khastegar by Ali Hatami in 1999.

=== Marriage to Ali Hatami ===
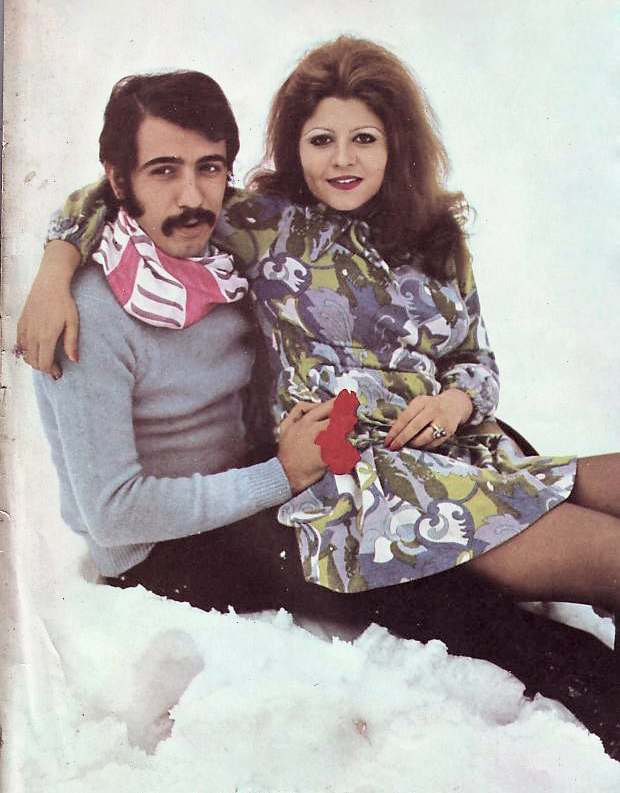
Ali Hatami and Zari Khoshkam on the cover of Weekly Information

Zari Khoshkam wed Ali Hatami in October 1971. For about three months thereafter, the media heard nothing about Khoshkam and Hatami, until January 1972, when Hatami confirmed the news of his marriage to Khoshkam during an interview with Weekly Information magazine (number 1572).

In this telephone conversation, Hatami told the Weekly Information reporter:

My three-month silence is due to my marriage with Zari, who will be a partner in my work from now on. I will start my work soon and my new works will be out of the fantasy form and the scenarios I have written will be new in the Persian cinema...

He also implicitly announced the change of Khoshkam's style and her distance from roles similar to her past roles and said:

... in my new films, Zari will play the role of a female star, and her character will be different from her past. I have started the production of my new movie called "The Suitor" a few days ago. I am responsible for half of the capital of this film and Zari is also responsible for the lead role...

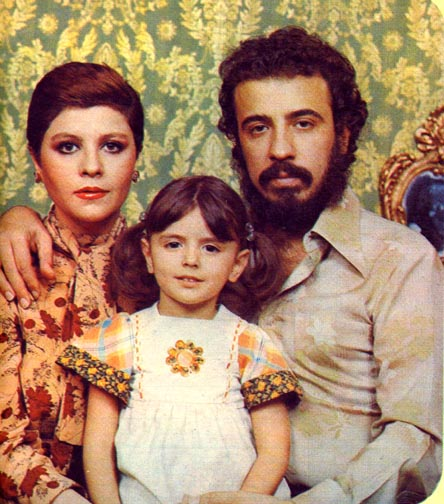
Ali Hatami and Zari Khoshkam with daughter Leila

After the birth of their first and only child, Leila Hatami, on 1 October 1972, Khoshkam practically withdrew from the cinema, and before the Iranian Revolution, she appeared in only one more role, that of Ezzat ed-Dowleh, Amir Kabir's wife, in the television series Soltan-e Sahebgharan (1975), directed by her husband.

=== After the Revolution ===
After the Revolution in 1979, Khoshkam had to choose a new identity for herself because of the country's new reality and thus changed her name to Zahra Hatami in accordance with her husband's last name. In this regard, Basir Nasibi wrote an article about the effects of the Islamic Revolution on actresses' lives as they had been before the Revolution, which he wrote on 20 November 2006 in Saarbrücken, Germany, on the sidelines of Shohreh Aghdashloo's interview with the BBC:

... the Revolution caused actresses to hide under their husbands' names, if they had husbands and, for example, Zari Khoshkam, a reckless actress of the professional Iranian cinema, turned into a housewife, Zahra Hatami, until the committees gave up on her!...

In the years after the Revolution, playing in some episodes of the television series Hezar Dastan was one of the few games she played in the years that followed. In this series, she played the role of Amina Aghdas, the bride of Noorchasmi Khan Muzaffar (played by Ezzatullah Tzamami), who merges time and earth to find a piece of her lost jewels. But parts of his play were removed during the broadcast, and finally it was officially banned at the same time as the wave of bans on actors' work from before the Revolution. Later, in 1999, Varuzh Karim-Masihi produced a film called Tehran Roozer No by reassembling parts of the series Hezar Dastan, which also featured Zahra Hatami.

Of course, Khoshkam (Hatami) was supposed to appear again in her husband's productions, but Ali Hatami eventually died of cancer after 25 years of married life with her in December 1996. In the same year, their only daughter, Leila Hatami, who after playing small roles in her father's films, had gone to Lausanne, Switzerland for higher education, returned to Iran because of her father's illness, and while acting in the film Leila by Dariush Mehrjui, married her opposite actor, Ali Mosaffa. Mosaffa is the son of Mozaher Mosaffa, a poet, writer and university professor, and his mother, Amir Banoo Karimi, was the daughter of Professor Seyed Karim Amiri Firuzkuhi, an Iranian poet and writer.

In 1997, after the production of the film Jahan Pahlavan Takhti was left unfinished owing to Ali Hatami's death, Behrouz Afkhami took over the production with Khoshkam's permission and before long, he had made a film in which Khoshkam herself appeared in some scenes. Playing the honorary and small role of Zari Khoshkam as Zahra Hatami in it was her first appearance in a film after the Revolution. In this film, some of Ali Hatami's other friends, relatives and colleagues, such as Mahmoud Kalari, also appeared in an honorary capacity. In addition to working with Behrouz Afkhami, Khoshkam also collaborated with other directors in an honorary way, among which the film Eshg + 2 (عشق+۲) by Reza Karimi should be mentioned, in which Zahra Hatami is thanked.

After many years, Zari Khoshkam's first serious experience in the cinema after the Revolution, again under the name Zahra Hatami, was acting in the film Portrait of a Lady Far Away, directed by her son-in-law Ali Mosaffa in 2002, which is based on the story of her life. An elderly engineer who separated from his wife and son and lived alone, paid, and Zari Khoshkam played the role of an Afghan singer named Khursheed. His daughter, Leila, played the lead role in this film.

Apart from such activities, in later years, Zahra Hatami's name was heard several times from the press and media for other reasons. For example, in 2006, when Mohammad Mehdi Dadgou, a cinema producer, announced that he planned to re-edit parts of the Soltan-e Sahebgharan television series to produce two independent films titled Amir Kabir and Mirzarzai Kermani. Zahra Hatami reacted to this news, showing her opposition to such an action. Also, in the same year, when Tehran's Niagara cinema burnt down, the name of Zahra Hatami as the main owner of this cinema was heard many times.

Zari Khoshkam or Zahra Hatami received the Ali Hatami Award as the best screenwriter of thirty years of post-Revolutionary Iranian cinema at the second celebration of the Critics and Writers Association in 2007.

Zahra Hatami's last film appearance was in the film Dar Dunya Tu (2015, Safi Yazdanian's first feature film) in which she played the role of Hawa Khanum next to her son-in-law and her daughter, and after that, she also played a role in Shalevar (2016, Hamid Nematullah) alongside Amin Hayai.

Khoshkam died on 16 May 2024, at the age of 76. Her funeral was held the next day at the Behesht Zahra artists' plot (35°32′04″N 51°22′52″E).

== Filmography ==
=== Cinema ===
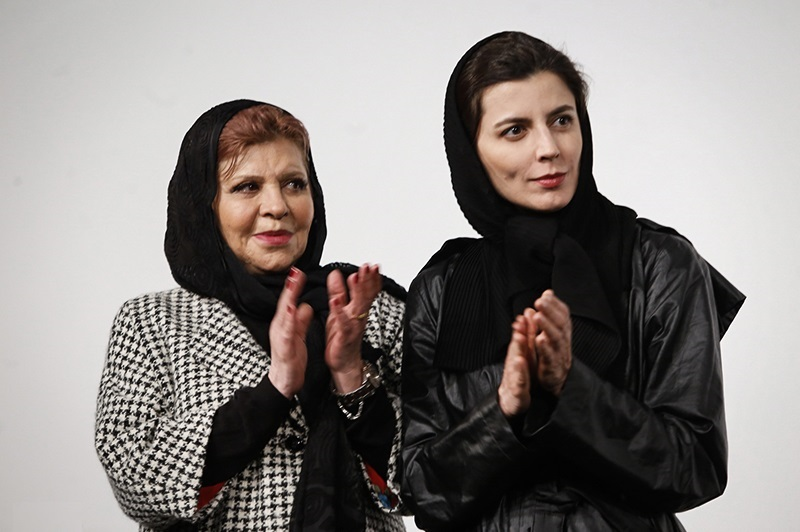
Khoshkam and daughter Leila at a press conference for the film What's the Time in Your World? (2014).

- Adamak (آدمک; Dummy; 1971)
- A Hut Across the River (کلبه‌ای آن‌سوی رودخانه; 1971)
- Alcoholic (الکلی; 1971)
- Rashid (رشید; 1971)
- The Man of a Thousand Smiles (مرد هزار لبخند; 1971)
- Repentance (توبه; 1972)
- Topoli (تپلی; 1972)
- Khastegar (خواستگار; Suitor; 1972)
- Jahan Pahlavan Takhti (جهان‌پهلوان تختی; 1997)
- New Tehran (طهران روزگار نو; 1999)
- Portrait of a Lady Far Away (سیمای زنی در دوردست; 2003)
- What's the Time in Your World? (در دنیای تو ساعت چند است؟; 2014)
- Flaming (شعله‌ور; 2016)
- Talakhon (طلاخون; 2019)

=== Television ===
- Soltan-e Sahebgharan (سلطان صاحبقران; 1975)
- Hezar Dastan (هزاردستان; The Nightingale; 1979–1987)
