= Nikah Halala (film) =

Mohallel
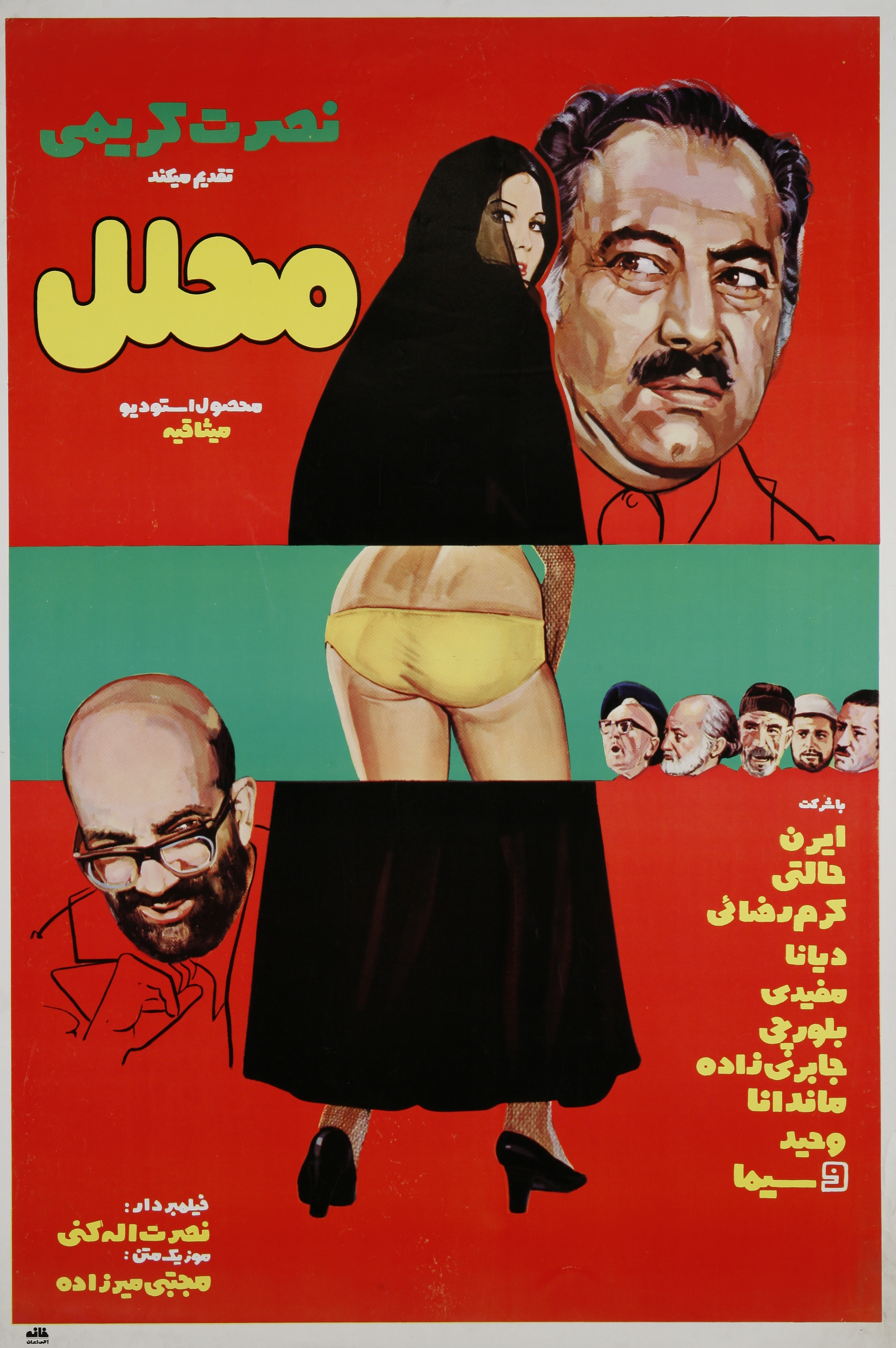
- Directed by: Nosrat Karimi
- Written by: Nosrat Karimi
- Produced by: Mehdi Misaghieh
- Starring: Nosrat Karimi; Irene Zazians; Reza Karam Rezaei; Rouholah Mofidi; Gholamhoseein Mofidi; Akhtar Karimi Zand (Diana)
- Music by: Mojtaba Mirzadeh; Abdolah Mirzadeh
- Release date: 1971
- Running time: 110 minutes
- Country: Iran
- Language: Persian

Nikah Halala (English Title: The Interim Husband; Persian title: Mohallel, Persian: محلل) is a 1971 Iranian Persian-language romance comedy directed by Nosrat Karimi and starring Karimi, Irene Zazians, Reza Karam Rezaei, Rouholah Mofidi, Gholamhoseein Mofidi, and Akhtar Karimi Zand (Diana).

The film is about the controversial practice of Mohallel.

== Plot ==
A man regrets divorcing his wife in rage due to a misunderstanding, and wishes to reunite with her. However, the divorce office clerk by mistake registers their divorce as irreversible. Now he has to find someone incapable of sexual intercourse to marry his ex-wife, consummate the union and divorce her, as dictated by Nikah halala, so the first husband can marry her again.

== Cast ==
- Nosrat Karimi
- Irene Zazians
- Reza Karam Rezaei
- Rouholah Mofidi
- Gholamhoseein Mofidi
- Akhtar Karimi Zand (Diana)
