= Mahin Deyhim =

Iranian actress (1925–2001)

- مهین دیهیم
- Born: Kobra Rajaei Azad; 1925; Tehran, Iran
- Died: 2001 (aged 75–76); Tehran, Iran
- Resting place: Behesht-e Zahra, Tehran
- Occupations: Actress, voice actress
- Years active: 1945–1991
- Spouse: Fereydoun Deyhim (divorced)

Mahin Deyhim (Persian: مهین دیهیم; 1925 – 30 September 2001) was an Iranian actress and voice actress who worked in theatre, cinema, radio and television between the years 1945 until 1991. She began her career in theatre in the mid-1940s and became known for her performances in Iranian films and radio plays.

== Biography ==
Deyhim was born in Tehran in 1925. Her birth name is recorded as Kobra Rajaei Azad, but she was known as Mahin Rajaei before her marriage to Fereydoun Deyhim. She attended secondary school but left before completing her studies.

She developed an interest in theatre at a young age. Around 1945, when she was about twenty years old, she appeared in The Merchant of Venice at the Farhang Theatre in Tehran. She then appeared at several of the city's theatres, including the Dehghan Theatre in Zowraq-e Bi-Saheb (lit. The Ownerless Boat), the Ferdowsi Theatre in Sho'leh (lit. Flame), and the Tehran Theatre in Nini Koochooloo (lit. Little Baby).

Some of her other stage performances included The Blue Bird by Maurice Maeterlinck, Cat on a Hot Tin Roof by Tennessee Williams, and Anna Christie by Eugene O'Neill. She also worked as a makeup artist on many of the productions she performed.

Deyhim was formerly married to Fereydoun Deyhim, also a theatre actor, and kept his surname professionally after their separation.

=== Film career ===
Deyhim made her film appearance in Eshtebah (lit. The Mistake), directed by Mansour Mobini, in 1952. The same year, she appeared in Gerdab (lit. Whirlpool), directed by Hassan Khordmand. She gained wider recognition for her performance in The Bereft (lit. Bipanah, 1953), directed by George Obadiah.

During the 1960s, Deyhim gradually reduced her film work and concentrated more on radio. She returned to cinema in a supporting role in Beyzai's Ballad of Tara (1979), playing a neighbour's wife.

=== Radio and television ===
Deyhim began working in radio in 1956. Known for her expressive voice, she performed in radio dramas and comedy programmes, including Shoma va Radio (lit. You and Radio), broadcast on Friday mornings, Jomeh Bazar (lit. Friday Market) and Radio Ta'tili (lit. Holiday Radio). She also participated in voice dubbing and was associated with the early generations of Iranian dubbing performers.

In a note published by Radio Farda in October 2001 on Mahin Deyhim, she was described as one of the country's leading radio performers for more than half a century.

Following the Iranian Revolution of 1979, Deyhim focused primarily on radio and television. Her later television credits included Ba Yek Gol Bahar, Paeez-e Eshgh and Arayeshgah-e Ziba, the latter directed by Marzieh Boroumand.

=== Death ===
Deyhim suffered from diabetes in her later years, which considerably limited her activities. She died in Tehran on 30 September 2001 and was buried in the Behesht-e Zahra cemetery.
