= Homayun (actor) =

Iranian actor (1937–2025)

Mohammad-Ali Tabrizian (Persian: محمدعلی تبریزیان; 5 May 1937 – 18 July 2025), better known as Homayun (همایون), was an Iranian actor. His most notable roles are in films such as Topoli and Soltan-e Ghalbha. Homayun was born in Mashhad, Iran on 5 May 1937, and died on 18 July 2025, at the age of 88.
