= Soltan-e Sahebgharan =

- سلطان صاحبقران
- Directed by: Ali Hatami
- Starring: Jamshid Mashayekhi; Parviz Fannizadeh; Nasser Malekmotei; Zahra Hatami; Iren
- Country of origin: Iran
- Original language: Persian

Production
- Production location: Tehran
- Camera setup: 16mm film

Original release
- Network: National Iranian Radio and Television
- Release: 1974

Soltan-e Sahebgharan (Persian: سلطان صاحبقران; also Romanized as Soltān-e Sāhebgherān) is an Iranian historical 1974 TV series directed by Ali Hatami. It stars Jamshid Mashayekhi, Naser Malek Motiee, Iren, Parviz Fanizadeh, Zari Khoshkam, Saeed Nikpour and Jahangir Forouhar. It deals with the Ghajar dynasty era and Nasereddin shah and Amir Kabir's relations and struggles and also assassination of the Shah by Mirza Reza Kermani.

== Cast ==
- Jamshid Mashayekhi as Nasereddin Shah
- Zari Khoshkam as Ezzatoddoleh
- Naser Malek Motiee as Amir Kabir
- Irene Zazians as Mahd-e Olya
- Parviz Fanizadeh as Malijak
- Saeed Nikpour as Mirza Reza Kermani
- Jahangir Forouhar as Mirza Aqa Khan-e Nuri
