= Davud Monshizadeh =

Leader of the SUMKA party and Nazi Collaborator (1914–1989)

- Born: 28 August 1914; Tehran, Sublime State of Persia
- Died: 13 July 1989 (aged 74); Uppsala, Sweden
- Education: Humboldt University of Berlin
- Political party: SUMKA
- Military career
- Allegiance: Germany
- Branch: Schutzstaffel
- Conflicts: World War II; • Battle of Berlin (WIA)
- Father: Ebrahim Monshizadeh

Davud Monshizadeh (Persian: داوود منشی‌زاده; 28 August 1914 – 13 July 1989) was an Iranian Nazi politician, propagandist, and scholar of Iranian studies. Born in Tehran, Iran, he later lived in Nazi Germany. A member of the Schutzstaffel (SS), he supported Nazism during World War II, and produced print and radio propaganda. After the war, he continued supporting Nazism in Iran, founding SUMKA (the "Iranian National Socialist Workers Party"). Later, he became a professor of Iranian languages for Uppsala University in Sweden, a position he held until his death.

== Career ==
Monshizadeh was originally sent to France in 1931 by the Iranian government to study. In 1937 he moved to Germany, a year after the Hitler Cabinet declared Iranians to be "pure−blooded Aryans" and immune to all Nuremberg Laws, thus making them capable of becoming Reich citizens. In 1938, he began his studies in Nazi Germany. He studied under Walther Wüst, with whom he developed a close bond.

Together with the future Iranian Propaganda Director, Bahram Shahrokh, he started working for the Persian program of the Third Reich’s Deutsche Radio in 1939. In 1940, he started writing articles for Das Reich, the official newspaper of the Nazi Party. In the following year, he worked with various organizations in the Third Reich. Monshizadeh also joined the SS during this time.

During the war, he worked as a translator for interrogations with Soviet prisoners of war on the Eastern Front. The Nazis regarded Monshizadeh as an expert on the Jewish Question in Nazi Germany. As a member of the SS, he fought and was wounded in the Battle of Berlin in 1945, being hospitalized (off and on) until 1947.

He obtained his doctorate in philosophy and literature from the Humboldt University of Berlin in 1943. After the war, he was a professor at the Ludwig-Maximilians-Universität München (LMU) and was deeply influenced by Jose Ortega y Gasset's philosophy, even translating many of his books (which he hoped would serve as founding principles for the party), from Spanish into Persian. In 1947, he taught Iranology and Persian language at the LMU.

He returned to Iran in 1951, and established SUMKA, which played a role against oil nationalization in Iran, together with Manouchehr Amir Mokri and Hussein Zarabi in the following year.

In 1953, he was "unofficially exiled" to Europe by Shah Mohammad Reza Pahlavi. He would later serve as a professor of Persian Studies at Uppsala University and Alexandria University.

He left Iran in 1963 and came to Sweden on the initiative of Professor Stig Wikander. He spent the rest of his life in Sweden teaching Iranology and Persian language at Uppsala University, eventually becoming Professor in Iranian Languages. In 1989, he died in Uppsala, Sweden, and is buried at Uppsala Old Cemetery.

Monshizadeh was known as an admirer of Hitler and imitated many of the ways of the National Socialist German Workers Party (such as their militarism and salute), as well as attempting to approximate Hitler's physical appearance, including his moustache.

He was the son of Ebrahim Monshizadeh and the maternal grandson of Mirza Yahya Sarkhosh Tafreshi.

== Works ==
- Das Persische im Codex Cumanicus, Uppsala: Studia Indoeuropaea Upsaliensia, 1969.
- Topographisch-historische Studien zum iranischen Nationalepos, Wiesbaden: Abhandlungen für die Kunde des Morgenlandes, 1975.
- Wörter aus Xurāsān und ihre Herkunft, Leiden: Acta Iranica; Troisième série, Textes et mémoires, 1990.
- Die Geschichte Zarēr's, ausführlich komment. von Davoud Monshi-Zadeh, Uppsala: Studia Indoeuropaea Upsaliensia, 1981.
- Ta'ziya : das persische Passionsspiel / mit teilweiser Übersetzung der von Litten gesammelten Stücke von Davoud Monchi-Zadeh, Stockholm: Skrifter utgivna av K. Humanistiska vetenskapssamfundet, 1967.
- Vihrūd va Arang : justārhā-yī dar jughrāfiy-̄yi asāṭīr ̄va tārīkh-̄i Īrān-i sharqī, pazhūhish-i Josef Markwart; tarjumah bā iz̤āfāt az Davūd Munshī-Zādah, Teheran: Majmūʻah-'i Intishārāt-i adabī va tārīkhī, 1989. (in Persian)
