= Emad al-Kottab =

Iranian calligrapher (1861–1936)

Mirza Mohammad Hussein Seifi Qazvini
- محمد حسین سیفی قزوینی
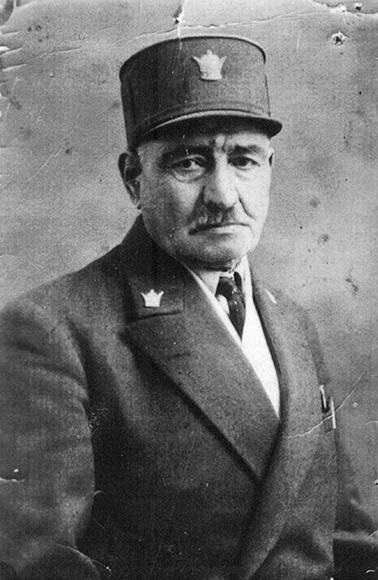
- Born: 16 April 1861
- Died: 17 July 1936 (aged 75); Qazvin, Imperial State of Iran
- Burial place: Imamzadeh Abdollah, Ray
- Other names: Emad al-Kottab

Mirza Mohammad Hussein Seifi Qazvini (Persian: میزرا محمد حسین سیفی قزوینی), better known as Emad al-Kottab (Persian: عمادالکتاب) was an Iranian calligrapher best known for being a member of the Punishment Committee.

He is credited with writing the calligraphic pieces on the Tomb of Ferdowsi and Dar al-Fonun, among other places.

He died on 17 July 1936, and was buried in Imamzadeh Abdollah, Ray.

His role was played by Jamshid Mashayekhi in the popular Iranian series Hezar Dastan.

== Calligraphy examples ==
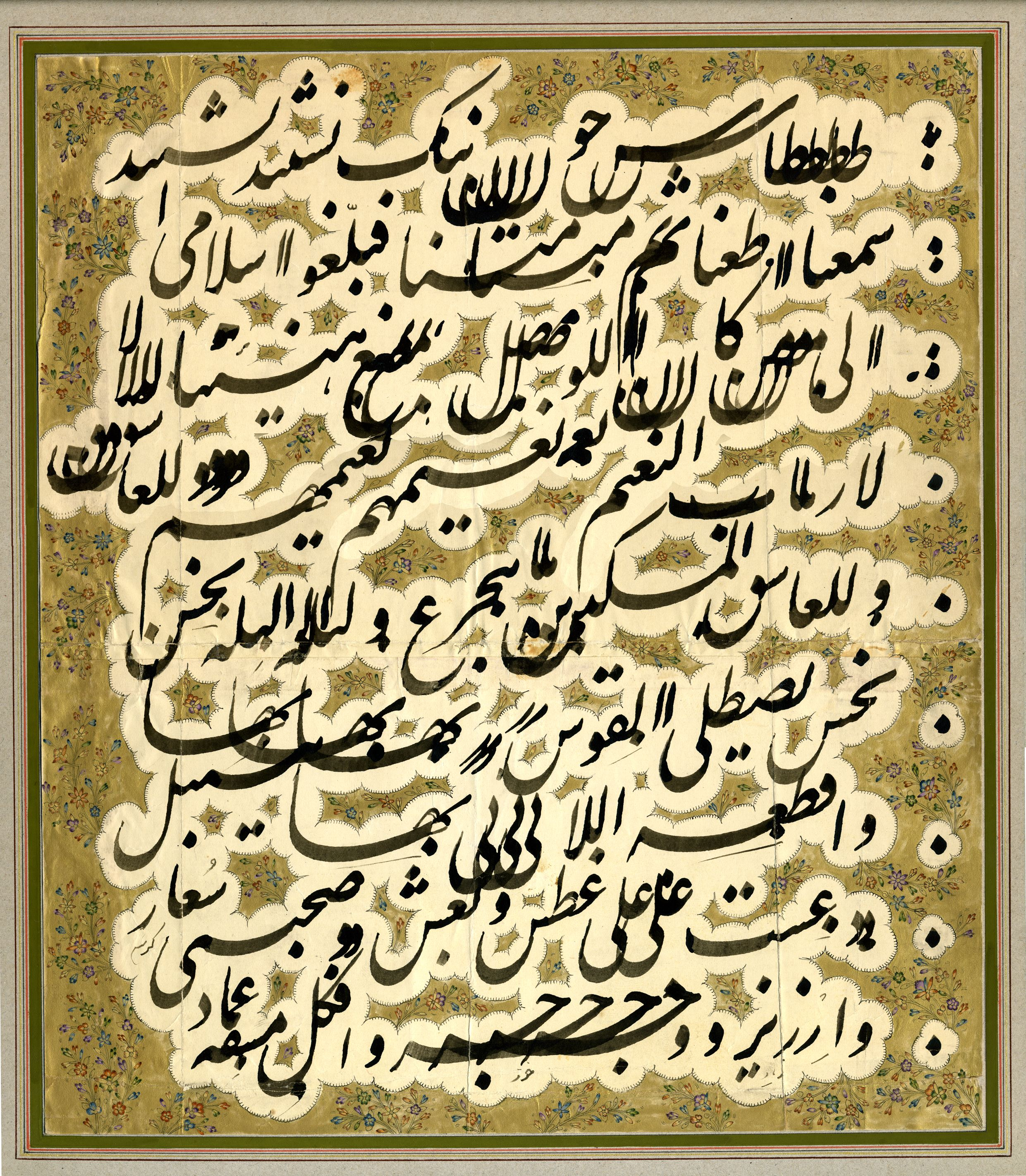

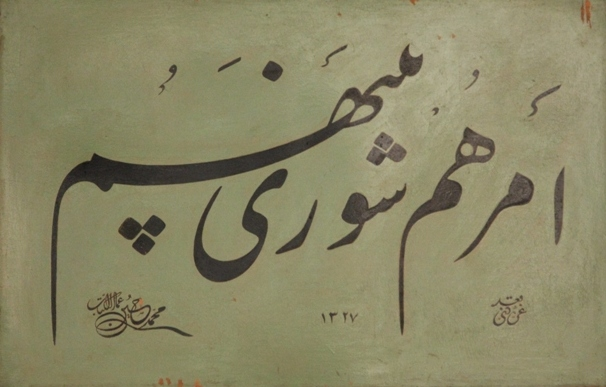

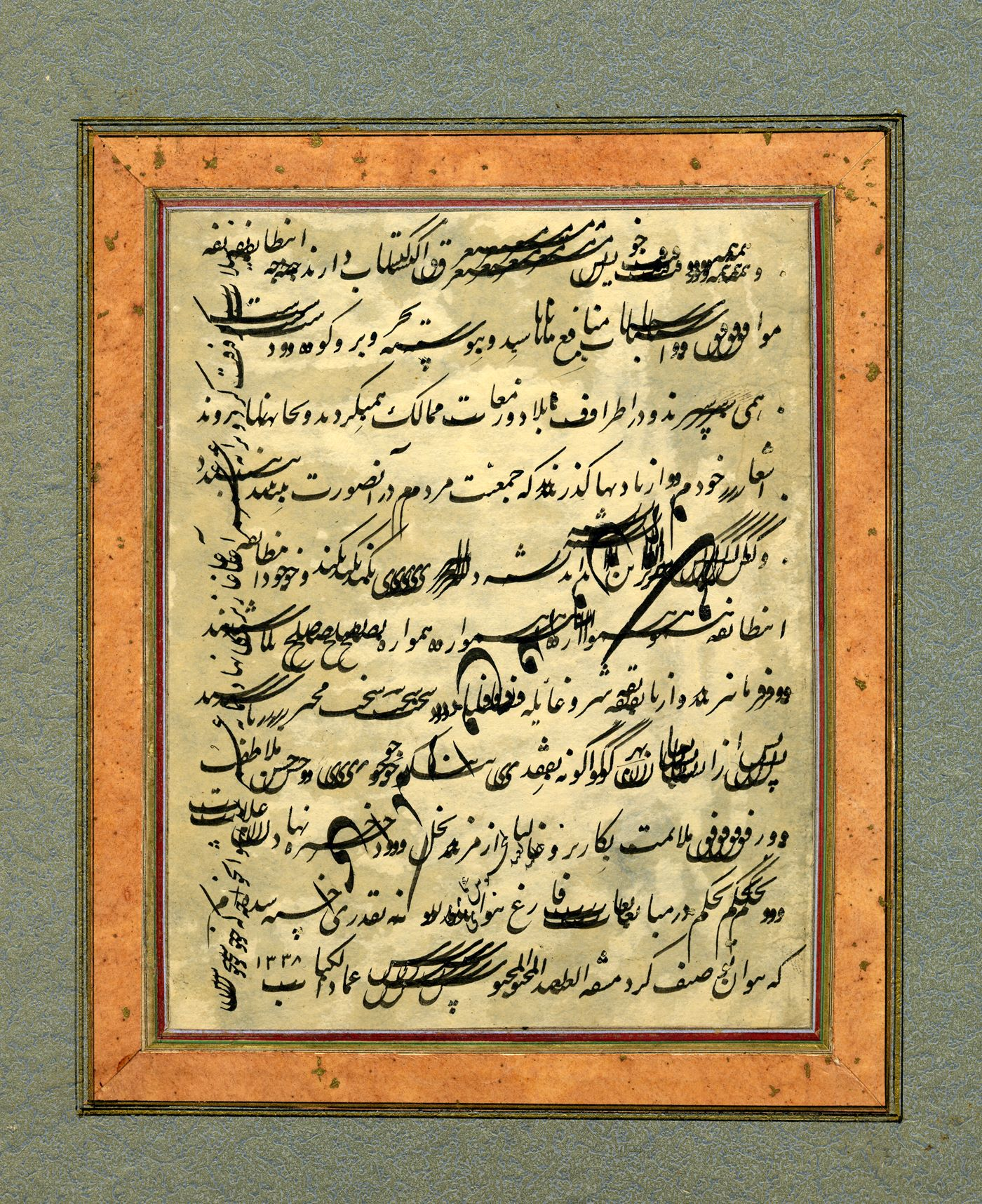

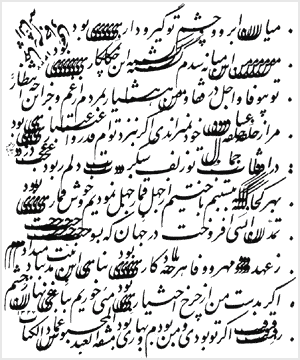

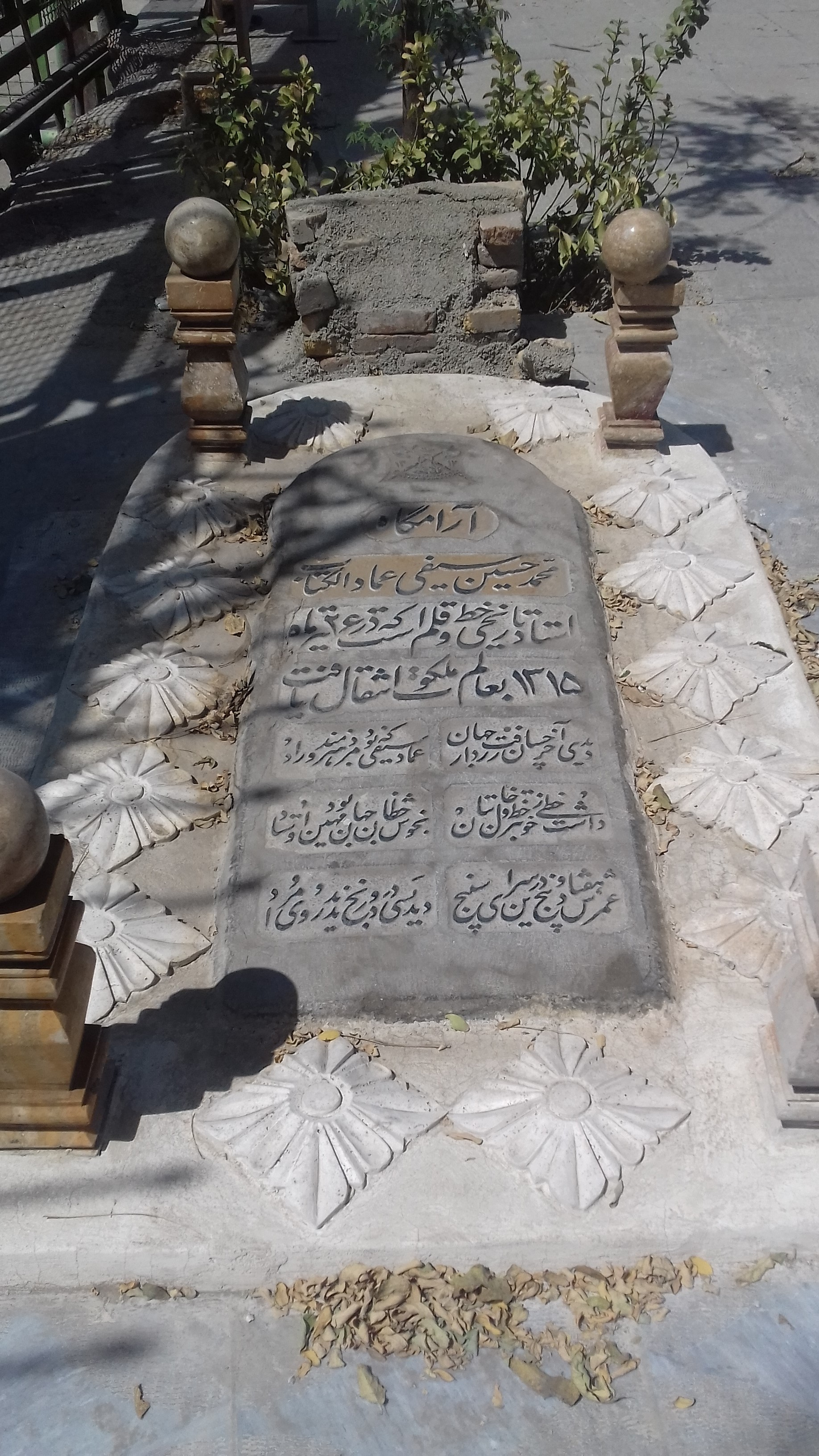
Emad al-Kottab's grave in Imamzadeh Abdollah
