= The Bereft =

1953 film

- Directed by: George Obadiah
- Written by: Ali Kasmaie
- Production company: Pars Film
- Release date: 7 November 1953
- Running time: 115 minutes
- Country: Iran
- Language: Persian

The Bereft (Persian: Bipanah) is a 1953 Iranian film directed by George Obadiah.

== Bibliography ==
- Mohammad Ali Issari. Cinema in Iran, 1900-1979. Scarecrow Press, 1989.
