= Parviz Aboutaleb =

Iranian footballer (1942–2020)

Personal information
- Full name: Parviz Aboutaleb
- Date of birth: 1942
- Place of birth: Tehran, Iran
- Date of death: 9 June 2020 (aged 77–78)
- Position: Striker

Youth career
- 1952–1958: Rah Ahan

Senior career*
Years	Team	Apps	(Gls)
1958–1960	Rah Ahan		
1960–1961	Deyhim		
1961–1967	Taj		

Managerial career
- Rah Ahan U-23
- Taj U-23
- Rah Ahan
- Iran U-17
- Iran U-20
- Iran U-23
- 1982: Iran
- * Club domestic league appearances and goals

Parviz Aboutaleb (1942 – 9 June 2020) was an Iranian football player and manager. He was born in Tehran, Iran. Aboutaleb died of complications of Alzheimer's disease on June 9, 2020. Parviz will be buried in Tehran's Behesht Zahra Cemetery.
