= SUMKA =

National Socialist Workers Party of Iran حزب سوسیالیست ملی کارگران ایران
- Abbreviation: SUMKA
- Leader: Davud Monshizadeh
- Spokesperson: Shapour Zandnia
- Founded: 1952; 74 years ago
- Dissolved: Around 1953
- Headquarters: "Black House", Khaneqah Street, Tehran
- Membership: approx. 600 (1952 est.)
- Ideology: Neo-Nazism; Fascism; Pan-Iranism; Anti-communism
- Political position: Far-right
- Anthem: "سرود حزب سومکا " Sumka Party Anthem

Party flag

The National Socialist Workers Party of Iran (Persian: حزب سوسیالیست ملی کارگران ایران, romanized: Hezb-e Sosiyālist-e Melli-ye Kārgarān-e Irān), better known by its abbreviation SUMKA (Persian: سومکا), was a Neo-Nazi party in Iran. The symbol of the party was a highly stylised Faravahar, on their flag appearing in a similar arrangement to the flag of Nazi Germany.

== Foundation ==
The party was formed in the early 1950s by Davud Monshizadeh and had a minor support base in Iranian universities. Critics of Mohammad Reza Pahlavi, the former Shah of Iran, allege that Pahlavi provided direct funding to SUMKA at one point.

== Development ==
Monshizadeh formed the SUMKA in 1952 along with Morteza Kossarian. Monshizadeh had lived in Germany since 1937, and was a former Schutzstaffel (SS) member, who fought and was wounded in the Battle of Berlin. Kossarian was also a former SS officer, who was part of the planning of Operation Barbarossa and subsequently fought at the Battle of Kiev and the Battle of Stalingrad, where he was injured. Monshizadeh was also a professor at LMU Munich and was deeply influenced by José Ortega y Gasset's philosophy. SUMKA briefly attracted the support of young nationalists in Iran, including Dariush Homayoon, an early member of the party who would later rise to prominence in the country. SUMKA adopted the swastika and black shirt as part of their uniforms.

They were firmly opposed to the rule of Mohammad Mosaddegh during their brief period of influence, and the party worked alongside Fazlollah Zahedi in his opposition to Mossadegh. In 1953, they were part of a large group of Zahedi supporters who marched towards the palace of Mohammad Reza Pahlavi demanding the ousting of Mossadegh. The party would become associated with street violence against the supporters of Mossadegh and the Tudeh Party.

== Shock troops ==
The party had an "assault group" (guruhe hamle) with an estimated size of 100 members that openly attacked members of the communist Tudeh Party of Iran and the Soviet Cultural Center and Hungarian Trade Office in Tehran. Colonel Fateh, a retired officer of the Imperial Iranian Air Force, was responsible for training the unit.

== Financial sources ==
Colonel Fateh was the official patron of the SUMKA. After the 1953 Iranian coup d'état, the party received a monthly stipend of 2,500 Iranian rial from the police and other security authorities. In 1958, Monshizadeh received US$7,000 from SAVAK to go to the United States. The party was also possibly financed by foreign embassies based in Iran. In April 1952, Iranian police reported that Monshizadeh was seeking to establish ties with the British embassy to get financial support. It was allegedly funded by the Central Intelligence Agency (CIA) through TPBEDAMN.

== Legacy ==
Advocates of Nazism continue to exist in Iran and are active mainly on the Internet, mostly on chat sites dedicated to reviving groups such as SUMKA. As of 2010, they are reported to be a small yet slowly increasing minority of Iranian youths internationally. It is said that the neo-Nazi forums active in Iran were actually run by one of Monshizadeh's grandsons. In 2026, a neo-Nazi group named Neo Sumka (نئو سومکا in Persian) operates in the country, mixing militant accelerationism, neo-Nazism and Persian racial supremacy.

== Gallery ==
=== Party branches ===
SUMKA – Iran Youth branch.

SUMKA – assault group.

SUMKA – Technical unit.

Immortal unit and Leader emblem.

=== Image gallery ===
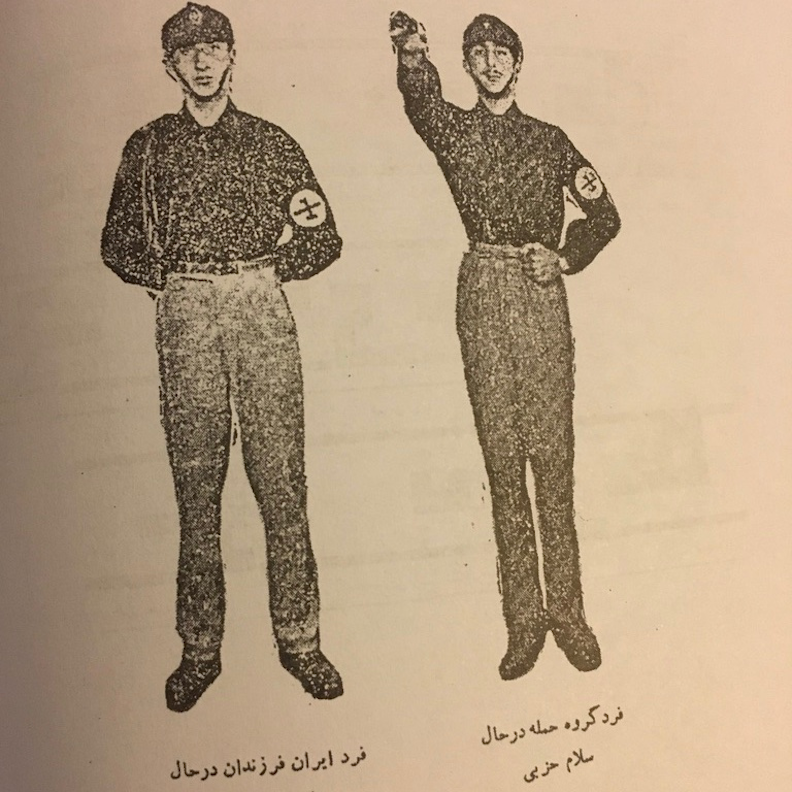
SUMKA Uniform diagram for shock troops and guards.

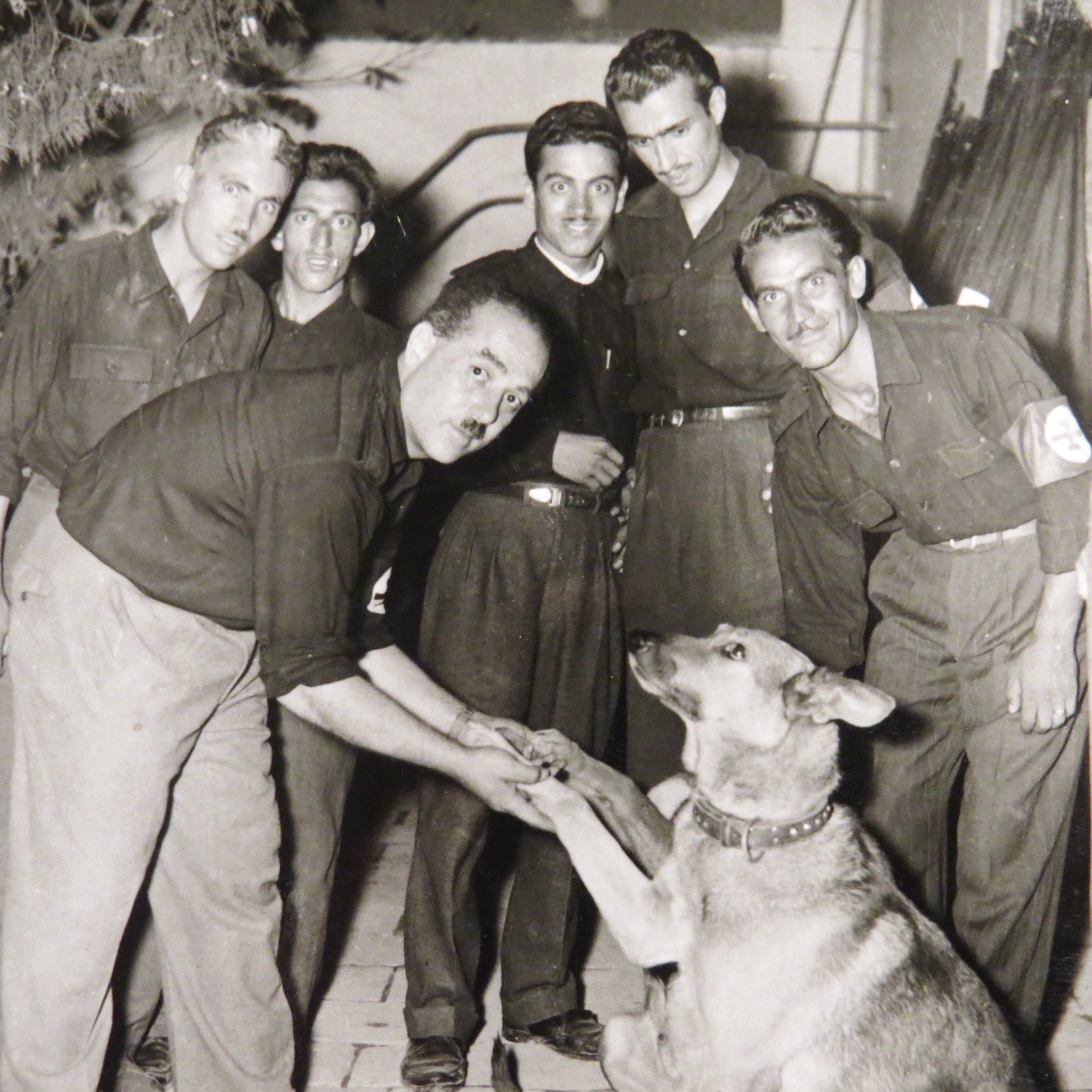
Davud Monshizadeh with SUMKA members.

Davud Monshizadeh in an undated photo.

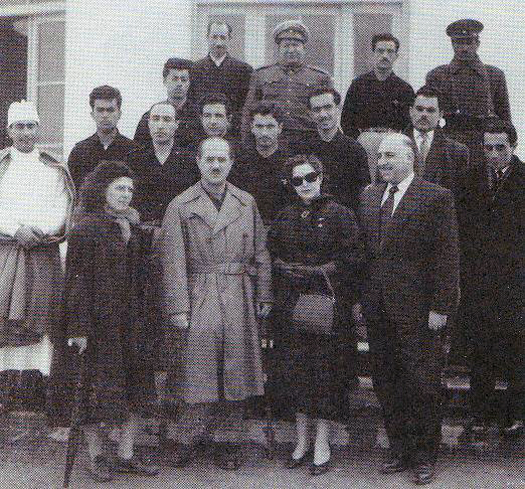
Davud Monshizadeh with SUMKA Command Khuzestan.

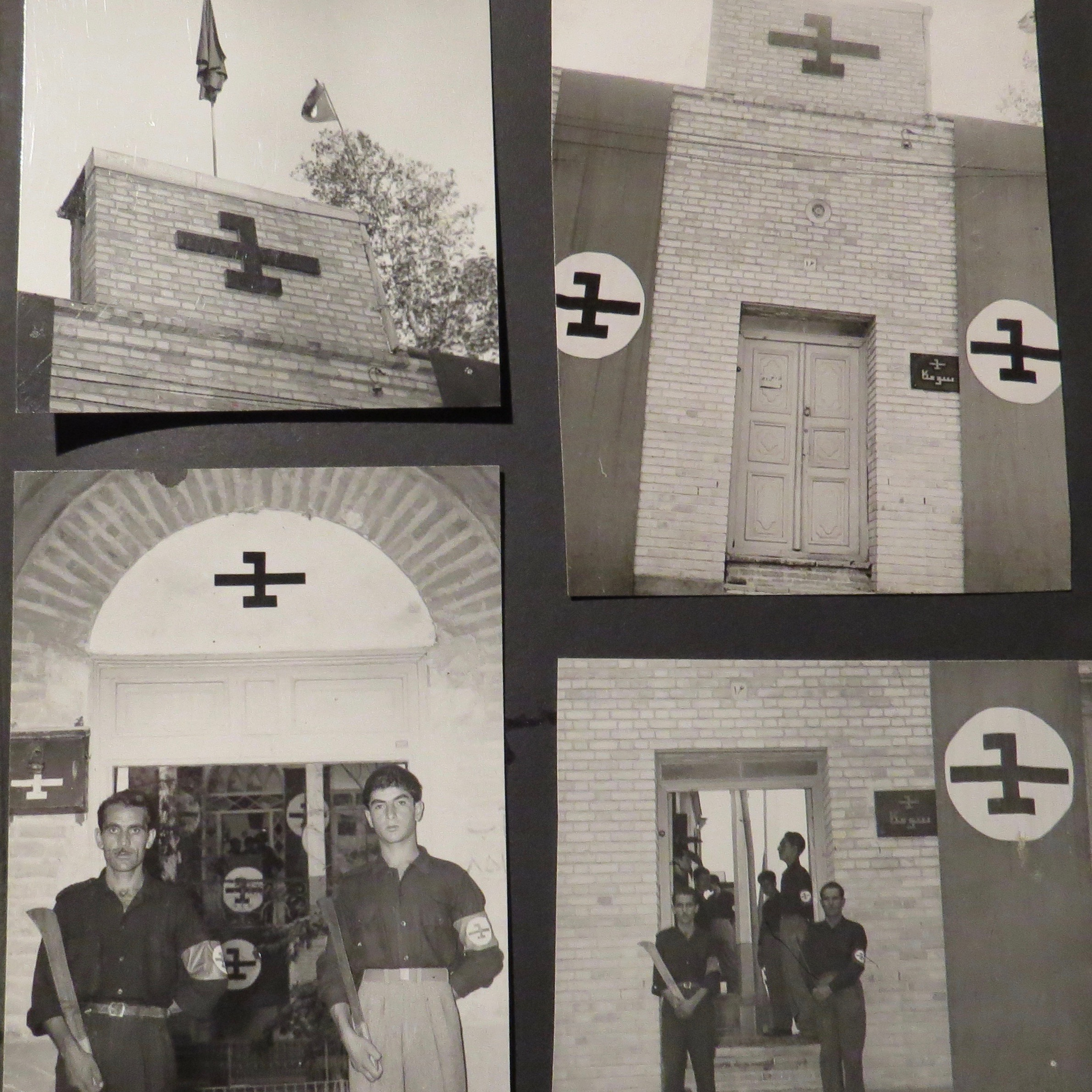
SUMKA Party House on Khanqah Street in Tehran; Nicknamed the "Black House".

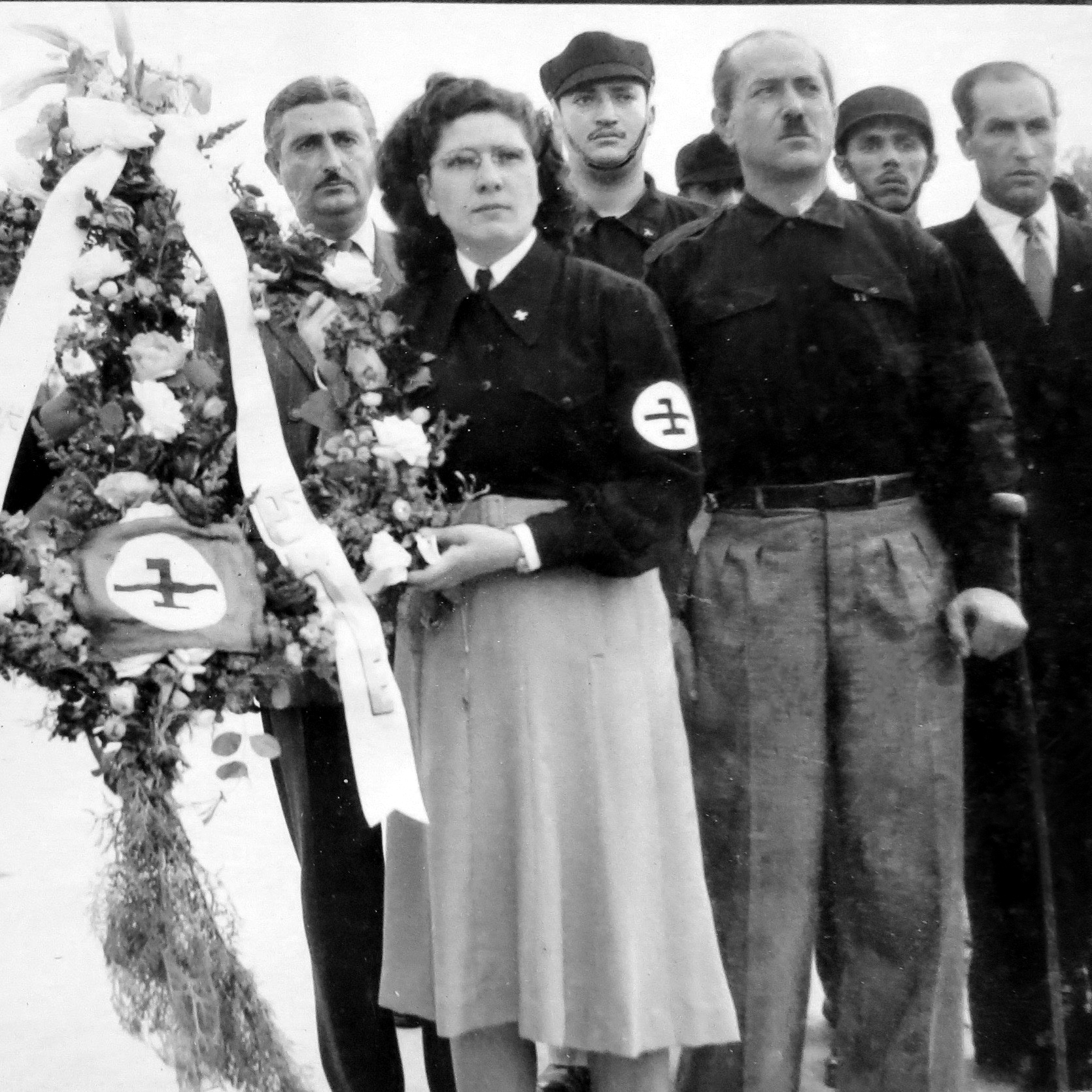
SUMKA ceremony, circa 1950s.

== See also ==
- Azure Party
- Aria Party
- Fascism in Asia
- Pan-Iranist Party
