= Hezar Dastan =

Iranian historic drama television series

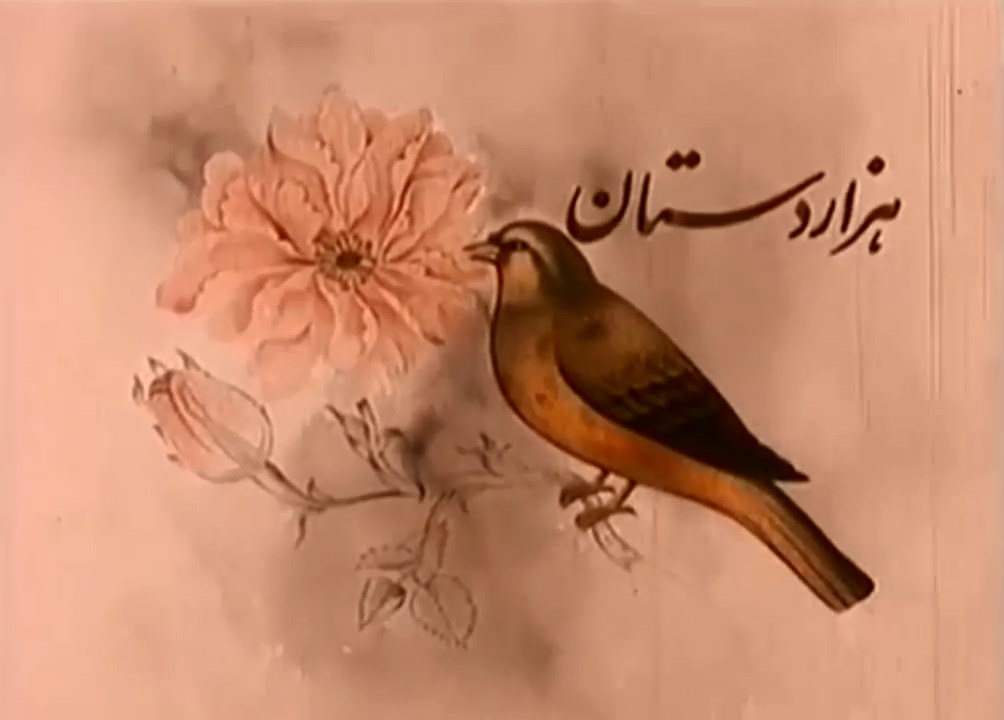
- Title Card (Episode 06); Handwritten by Samad Rostamkhani
- Hezardastan هزاردستان
- Genre: Historical drama Epic; Political drama
- Written by: Ali Hatami
- Directed by: Ali Hatami
- Starring: Jamshid Mashayekhi; Ezzatolah Entezami; Davoud Rashidi; Ali Nassirian; Mohammad-Ali Keshavarz; Jahangir Forouhar
- Opening theme: The Theme of Hezardastan (based on Bayat e Esfahan by Morteza Neidavoud)
- Composer: Morteza Hannaneh
- Country of origin: Iran
- Original language: Persian
- No. of episodes: 15

Production
- Producers: Ali Hatami, Mohammad Mahdi Dadgoo
- Production location: Ghazali Cinema City
- Cinematography: Mehrdad Fakhimi, Maziar Partow
- Editors: Abbas Ganjavi, Ali Hatami, Hassan Hassandoost
- Camera setup: Single-camera
- Running time: 45 minutes approx
- Production company: Islamic Republic of Iran Broadcasting

Original release
- Release: 1987

Hezardastan (Persian: هزاردستان, romanized: Hezār Dastān) also known as Hezar Dastan, was an Iranian epic historical drama television series from 1987, developed and directed by Ali Hatami. Hezar Dastan is considered one of the most important and most influential works of art in the history of Islamic Republic of Iran Broadcasting. The show's story, characters, acting, style, and music were highly acclaimed by critics and fellow directors of the time, and the influence of the show's themes and story can be seen in Iranian popular culture as well as many works of art coming in later years.

The production of the show took almost 8 years, starting in 1979 and ending in 1987, during which Hatami established a large set to represent Tehran in both Qajar dynasty and World War II, retroactively creating Iran's first movie studio and backlot (named Ghazali Cinema Town). The show was the ground for many controversies in terms of censorship and changes in the story. In 2006, Hezar Dastan was voted by the Association of Iranian movies and TV critics as the best Iranian TV series ever made.

== Plot ==
The story is split into two different timelines. The events of World War II and Anglo-Soviet invasion of Iran is where the main narrative takes place, but a great deal of the story is told through flashbacks to the last days of Qajar dynasty by Reza Khoshnevis.

Qazarian jewelry shop is robbed by Moffatesh Shesh Angoshti (Davoud Rashidi) during an official census by the government, following a direct order by Reza Shah Pahlavi. As a result of this robbery, a set of jewelry that belonged to Khan-e-Mozaffar's daughter-in-law, Amineh Aghdas (Zahra Hatami) went missing. Khan -e- Mozaffar (Ezzatolah Entezami), a mysterious aristocrat who used to be the governor of Kerman when Ahmad Shah Qajar was in power but has taken full-time residence in The Grand Hotel in Laleh-Zar Street of Tehran, asks the Head of Shahrbani (Jafar Vali) to locate the missing jewels. So the Head of Shahrbani assigns Moffatesh to find the set of jewelry.

Moffatesh searches his cache of stolen jewels, but realizes the missing jewels are not among them. So he suspects that the jewels must be among the ones that are sold to an unnamed Princess (Afsar Asadi). Moffatesh then conspires to have Shaban Ostekhani (Mohammad-Ali Keshavarz) interrupt the premiere of Lor Girl so that he can steal the jewels from The Princess in the chaos. But after showing them to Amineh Aghdas it is revealed that the jewels that were taken from The Princess are not the right ones. So after yet another unsuccessful attempt, Moffatesh realizes that a Police Officer (Nematollah Gorji) stole the set in the process of the robbery. He pressures the officer and retrieves the jewels for Khan -e- Mozaffar. Khan -e- Mozaffar, pleased with Moffatesh's loyalty and services, assigns him a task to get some highly sought-after calligraphy collection from a calligrapher in Mashhad.

Moffatesh, eager to please the men of power, travels to Mashhad and finds Reza Khoshnevis (Jamshid Mashayekhi). As per request of Khan -e- Mozaffar, Moffatesh then starts interrogating and torturing Reza Khoshnevis, until he breaks his will and he agrees to hand over his possessions to Moffatesh, but before doing so decides to tell Moffatesh a little about his personal history.

During the ruling of Ahmad Shah Qajar, Reza Khoshnevis (known then as Tofangchi and working as a rifleman), was employed by many aristocrats to accompany them during their hunting trips and lived a life of luxury but without any purpose. Until one day Reza's world is shaken due to a meeting with Abolfath (Ali Nassirian), a bookbinder in the Grand Bazaar of Tehran that starts a political discussion with Reza about his life and the hardship of common man under the rule of corrupt politicians and aristocracy. Reza, feeling a sense of obligation to his fellow men, then joins with Abolfath's secret organization (by the name of Komiteh Mojazat, roughly translated to "Retribution Committee") to act as a hired gun. His first target was Esmaeel Khan (Esmaeel Payandeh), the man in charge of Tehran's granary and from the perspective of Abolfath, the man responsible for famine among commoners.

After the assassination of Esmaeel Khan, Reza is tasked to kill another man: Matin -o- Saltane (Parviz Poorhosseini), the editor-in-chief of a conservative newspaper who was condemned by Komiteh Mojazat for publishing what they deemed as "untrue" or "treacherous to Iranian way of life". During this time, a government official by the name of Baqer Mirza (Jahangir Forouhar) is tasked to investigate the death of Esmaeel Khan. So the members of Komiteh Mojazat hire Shaban Ostekhani, then a notoriously violent homeless man whose job was to collect animal bones from eateries and make animal glue out of them, to keep an eye out for Baqer Mirza. Despite Baqer Mirza's threat, the assassination of Matin -o- Saltane goes underway successfully. Though Komiteh Mojazat later realizes the threat of Baqer Mirza more clearly, and so Shaban decapitates him as a message to government officials.

At this time, Abolfath and Reza were preparing for the assassination of what they deemed to be their biggest target and the most corrupt and powerful man in Iranian government. A man that Komiteh Mojazat gave the code-name of "Hezardastan" (English: The Nightingale, though can also mean "a creature with a thousand hands") to. But Abolfath tells Reza that Hezardastan is paying off the members of committee, and is slowly buying them off. Fearing for their own lives, Abolfath sends his wife and children to Tabriz and advises Reza to leave for Mashhad. Reza at first refuses, but after he's chased by Shaban under the orders of Hezardastan he finally leaves Tehran. In Mashhad, Reza takes refuge in the home of an old aristocrat by the name of Jalal ol-Molk (Hooshang Beheshti) and marries his daughter, Qamar (Shahla Mir Bakhtiar). He then retires his gun and starts to earn his living as a calligrapher, peacefully living outside of political landscape of Tehran and not knowing what happened to Hezardastan or Abolfath.

Moved by his story, Moffatesh reveals his true intentions behind interrogating Reza, but Reza refuses to go back to his home and asks Moffatesh to take him to Tehran to finish his mission and be able to locate and kill Hezardastan. After arriving in Tehran, Reza is taken to The Grand Hotel and given a room next to Khan -e- Mozaffar. In there Reza sells him his handwritten collection and begins to work as a ghost writer for Khan -e- Mozaffar, writing his memoirs. During this time the Anglo-Soviet invasion of Iran is happening and people are constantly rioting against the government and in one of this riots Shaban uses the opportunity to ransack several stores, including one belonging to an iron-smith by the name of Seyyed Morteza (Hosein Gil). Realizing the threat of Shaban, Khan -e- Mozaffar orders Moffatesh to kill Shaban. Moffatesh, still feeling loyalty toward Khan -e- Mozaffar, plans some government opium on Shaban and kills him.

Meanwhile Reza, while writing the memoirs of Khan -e- Mozaffar, slowly realizes that he is in fact Hezardastan; and that he is more powerful than he appears to be. Reza also learns that Abolfath was killed in prison by his then cellmate, Shaban. Reza tries to inform Moffatesh of this news, but Moffatesh tells him that he knew of Khan -e- Mozaffar's influence in everyday lives of Iranian people and he sees no way out of his employment. Moffatesh then is killed in his wedding day by Qolam Amme (Mohamad Motie), Shaban's nephew who in return got hanged for the murder of a police officer. Reza, once again shaken by the events and the apparent uselessness of common man in the face of powers behind the curtain, decides to leave Tehran, but his attempt is stopped by Khan -e- Mozaffar and he is informed that he cannot leave town until the memoirs are fully written. Reza, feeling helpless, decides to assassinate Khan -e- Mozaffar and finish his mission of eliminating Hezardastan. But his decision is discovered and he is poisoned by the Head Waiter of Grand Hotel (also portrayed by Jahangir Forouhar) before his attempt.

Weakened by the poison, Reza takes his gun and goes into Khan -e- Mozaffar's room to assassinate him; but instead is faced with the Head Waiter in Khan -e- Mozaffar's bed. Confused and barely standing, Reza goes to the balcony and then is pushed out by the Head Waiter. As people gather around Reza's corpse, Seyyed Morteza sees Khan -e- Mozaffar on the balcony looking down at the people and Reza. A voice over concludes the story, telling that Seyyed Morteza killed Khan -e- Mozaffar in the near future.

== Partial Cast ==
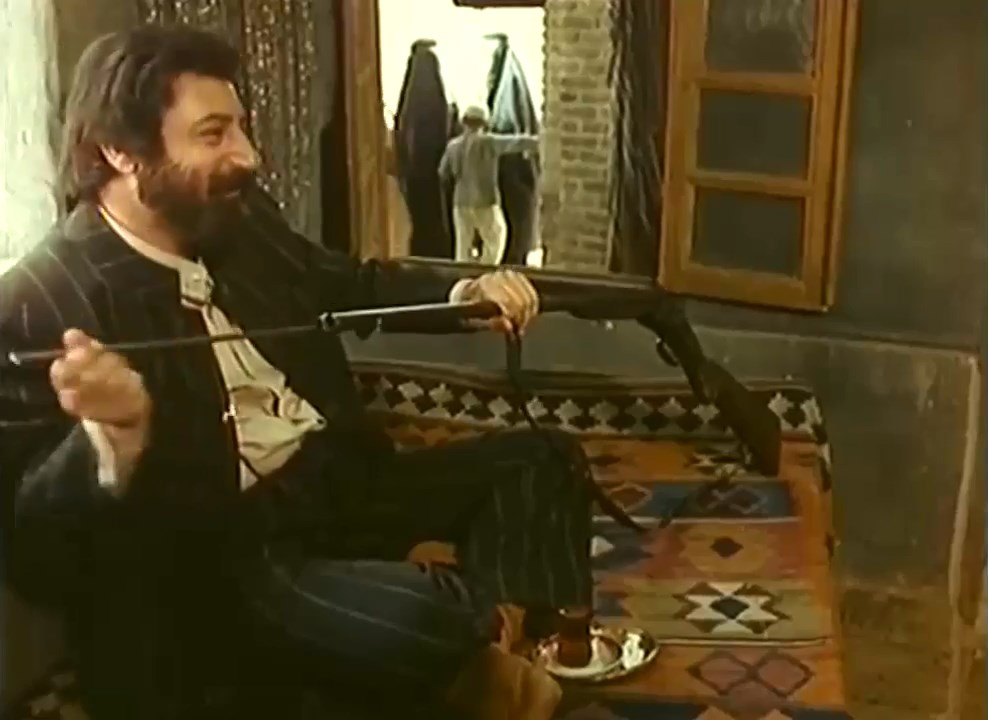
Jamshid Mashayekhi as Reza Khoshnevis (Tofangchi) during Qajar dynasty

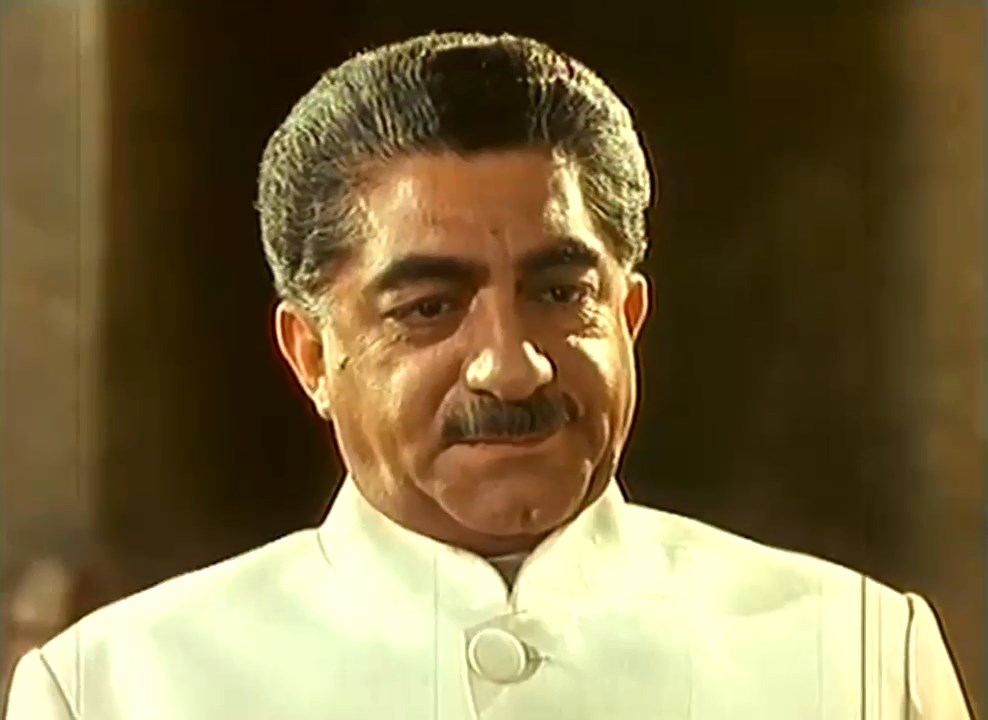
Ezzatolah Entezami as Khan -e- Mozaffar during Qajar dynasty

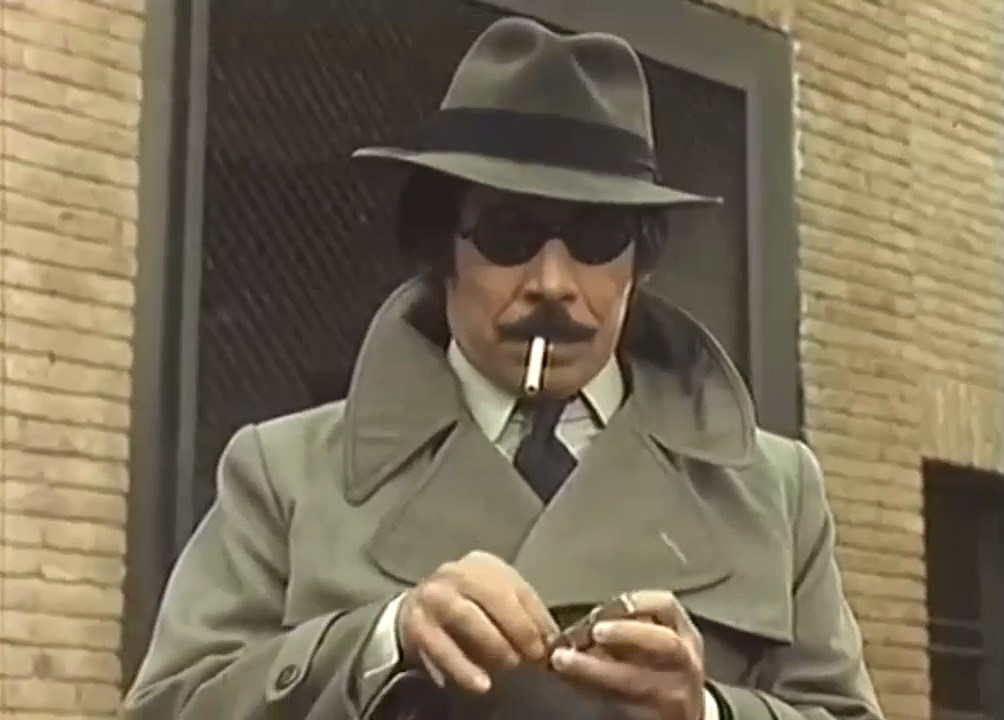
Davoud Rashidi as Moffatesh Shesh Angoshti

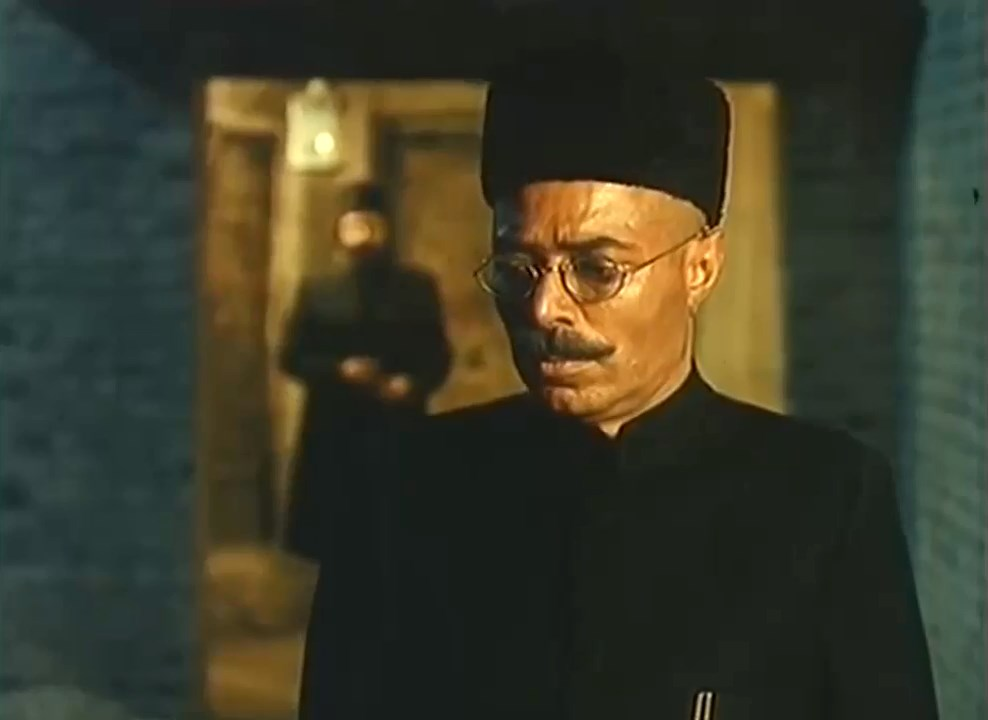
Ali Nassirian as Abolfath the Bookbinder

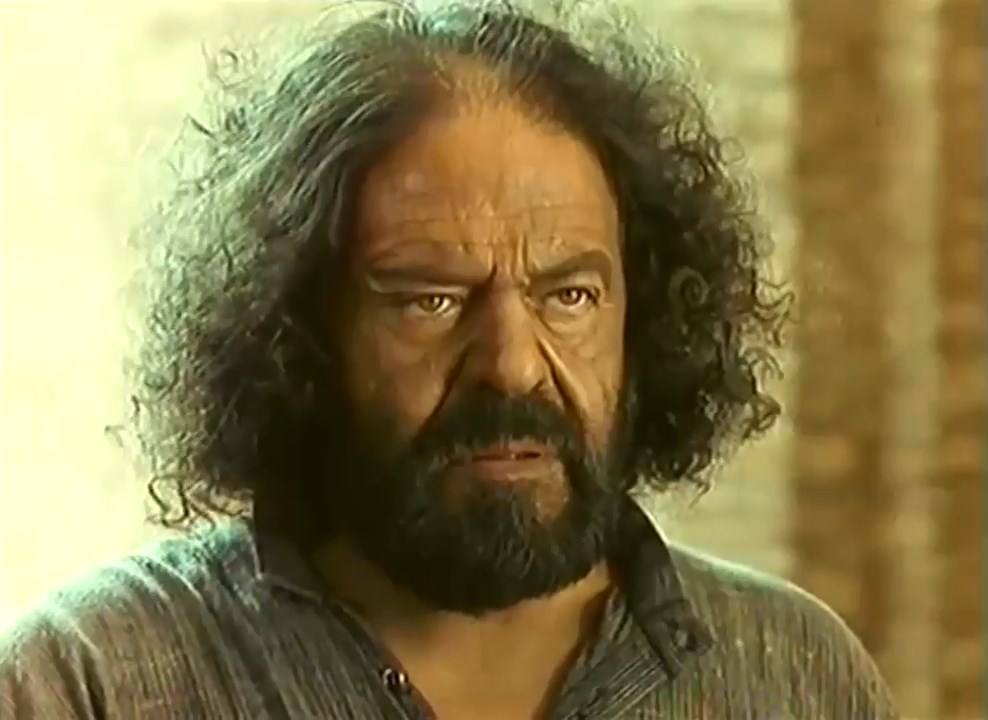
Mohammad-Ali Keshavarz as Shaban Ostadkhani (Ostekhani) during Qajar dynasty

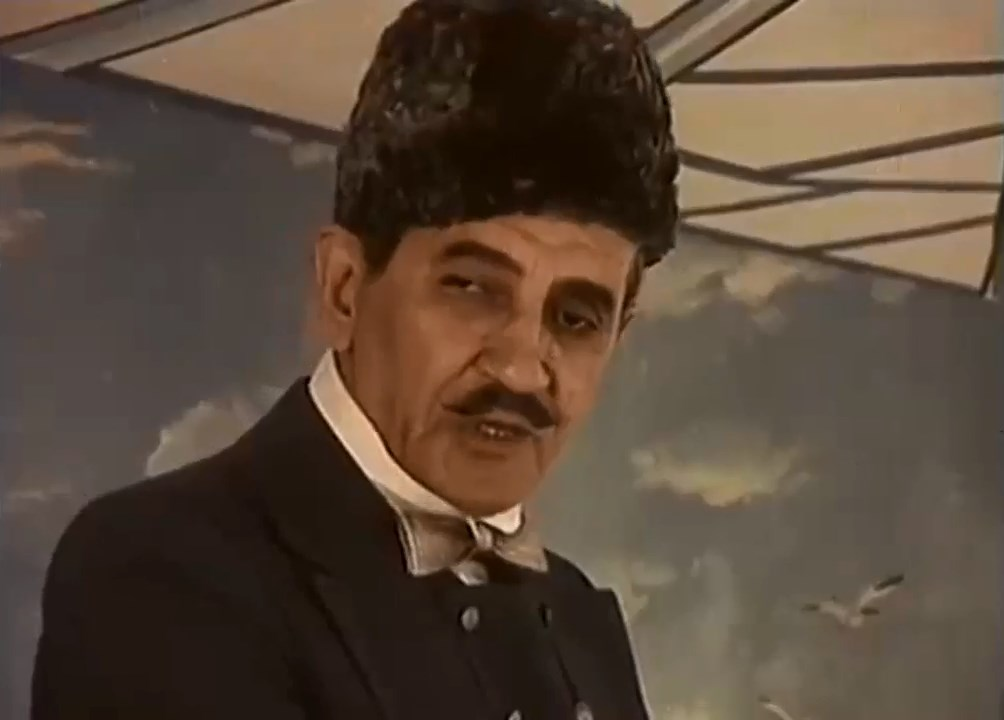
Jahangir Forouhar as Baqer Mirza

- Jamshid Mashayekhi as Reza Khoshnevis (Tofangchi):

An old calligrapher, ex-hunter and mercenary for Komiteh Mojazat. He is loosely based on four historical figures: Emad ol-Kottab, Mirza Mohammad Reza Kalhor, Karim Davatgar and Ali Hatami himself. He is the main link between the two halves of the story.

- Ezzatolah Entezami as Khan -e- Mozaffar (Hezardastan):

The former governor of Kerman, who lives full time in the Grand Hotel. He is presumably the most powerful man in Iran during World War II and controls everything from Import / Export dealings with foreign powers to Political Decisions of newly appointed Mohammad Reza Shah. He is presumed to be based on Abdol-Hossein Farmanfarma, though Ali Hatami constantly insisted that he was supposed to be the representation of all old powerful families that lived during the Qajar dynasty and not Farmanfarma alone.

- Davoud Rashidi as Moffatesh Shesh Angoshti (English: The Six-Fingered Inspector):

A corrupt investigator and interrogator who works for Khan -e- Mozaffar. According to Ali Hatami, he is based on a few historical figures such as Muhammad-Husayn Ayrom, Rokneddin Mokhtari, Mohammad Dargahi, Abbas Bakhtiari and Adib ol-Saltaneh. He is supposed to represent the authority figures, still under the influence of traditional family powers which have not been extinguished.

- Ali Nassirian as Abolfath the Bookbinder:

An Azeri revolutionary who believes that by eliminating people who "betray Iran", many of the problems plaguing the common man will also be eliminated. He is a representation of nationalists involved in Persian Constitutional Revolution, and his Azeri accent is also reminiscent of many people who fought for the Constitutional Revolution. He is also loosely based on Mirza Ebrahim Monshizadeh, Assadollah Khan Abolfathzadeh and Mohammad Nazar Khan Meshkat al-Mamalek, the people behind the actual Komiteh Mojazat during Qajar dynasty.

- Mohammad-Ali Keshavarz as Shaban Ostadkhani (Ostekhani):

A local thug who started working for Komiteh Mojazat, and later managed to become the de facto leader of a major organized crime group in Tehran during World War II. He is shown as illiterate and with no regards as to whom he gives his allegiance. He is a representation of many social figures and leaders of local street thugs such as Tayeb Haj Rezaei and Shaban Jafari. Despite his small role in the more high-stakes political decisions, he is the most violent power in play and mostly is shown in scenes of extreme blood and gore while nobody can muster up the courage to attack him, with a few who manage to attack him unable to inflict any damage due to his overgrown figure and stature.

- Jahangir Forouhar as Baqer Mirza:

An agent of Qajar police force who has been tasked by royal officials to find the assassin (or assassins) of Esmaeel Khan. He is shown as extremely more clever than his fellow officers, and has the foresight to see into many different social problems and their solutions. He is deemed a threat by Komiteh Mojazat after he is seen talking to Reza Khoshnevis, and so he is killed by Shaban Ostekhani while getting a shave.
- Jahangir Forouhar also plays the role of Head Waiter in Grand Hotel. An unnamed worker who is extremely loyal to Khan -e- Mozaffar. He is shown to almost be Khan -e- Mozaffar's personal assistant and his loyalty goes to the point that he puts his own life at risk by laying in Khan -e- Mozaffar's bed when Reza Khoshnevis attempts to assassinate him. He is the one who ultimately pushes Reza Khoshnevis to his doom.

- Hosein Gil as Seyyed Morteza, an iron-smith in Tehran who later kills Khan -e- Mozaffar
- Jafar Vali as Head of Shahrbani, who is loyal to Khan -e- Mozaffar
- Zahra Hatami as Amineh Aghdas, Khan -e- Mozaffar's daughter-in-law
  - Leila Hatami portrays her as a young girl
- Shahla Mir Bakhtiar as Qamar Banoo, Reza Khoshnevis's wife
- Mansoor Vala Magham as the Grand Hotel's Manager
- Parvis Poorhosseini as Matin -o- Saltane, editor-in-chief of "Asr -e- Jadid" newspaper
- Mohamad Motie as Qolam Amme, Shaban's nephew
- Jamshid Layegh as Jafar Gholi Khan Neshat (Uncle Neshat), a government agent during the census
- Esmail Mehrabi as Nasrollah Khorami, a government agent during the census
- Rogheyeh Chehreh-Azad as Qodsi, Khan -e- Mozaffar's maid
- Mino Abrishami as Jeiran, Abolfath's wife
- Ataollah Zahed as Seyyed Ebrahim Rohani, a rohani
- Esmail Mohammadi as Ostad Bahar, music teacher
- Nematollah Gorji as Police Officer
- Mohammad Varshouchi as Police Officer
- Soroosh Khalili as Qazarian, an Armenian jeweler during World War II
  - Soroosh Khalili also portrays the small role of Saqadar (a volunteer in charge of public water repositories) in Reza Khoshnevis's memories of old Tehran.
- Hooshang Beheshti as Jalal ol-Molk, an aristocrat in Mashhad and Reza Khoshnevis's father-in-law
- Esmaeel Payandeh as Esmaeel Khan, an aristocrat in charge of Tehran's granary
- Mohammad Taqi Kahnamuei as Mirza Hoda, a Dervish
- Jahangir Almasi as Doctor Feiz, an educated man of arts who has recently returned from abroad
- Saeed Amirsoleimani as Moeer ol-Doleh, an aristocrat in Tehran and the employer of Reza Khoshnevis before Komiteh Mojazat
- Asghar Hemmat as Hassan, a soldier of Iranian Army during Anglo-Soviet invasion of Iran
- Manouchehr Azari as the Grand Hotel's Doorman
- Akbar Doodkar as The Pharmacist
- Mahmoud Basiri as Dry Cleaner
- Afsar Asadi as The Princess
- Mehri Vadadian as Esmaeel Khan's Wife
- Farhang Mehrparvar as Dr. Khandan

== Controversies ==
=== The ending ===
The show was censored numerous times before it was cleared for screening by Islamic organizations in Iran. There are many rumors that the censorship even got to the point that the show's ending was changed from a more politically charged one involving Adolf Hitler and Khan -e- Mozaffar's involvement in the Axis powers. The abrupt ending of the show (ending on a voice over narration to conclude a very complicated plot while Ali Hatami was known for writing very detailed stories) and the fact that many of the main characters seem to vanish midway into the story were both clues for this rumor. As more people told their memories of the production, it was obvious that many scenes were cut and the ending might have been one of them.

=== "Komiteh Mojazat" and "Tehran, the New Days" ===
The show was re-edited by Varuzh Karim-Masihi as two feature films by the names of "Komiteh Mojazat" and "Tehran, the New Days" in 1999, each taking place in one part of the show's timeline and only telling half of the story. "Komiteh Mojazat" taking place in Reza Khoshnevis' memories and telling the tale of assassinations done by Reza and Abolfath, while "Tehran, the New Days" focuses only on the events of Anglo-Soviet invasion of Iran and the last days of Reza's life. The re-edited movies were heavily criticized by the family of Ali Hatami, who had died three years prior, for not acquiring permission and butchering many of the themes and important story beats that made the show so compelling and unique.
