= Abdolhossein Noushin =

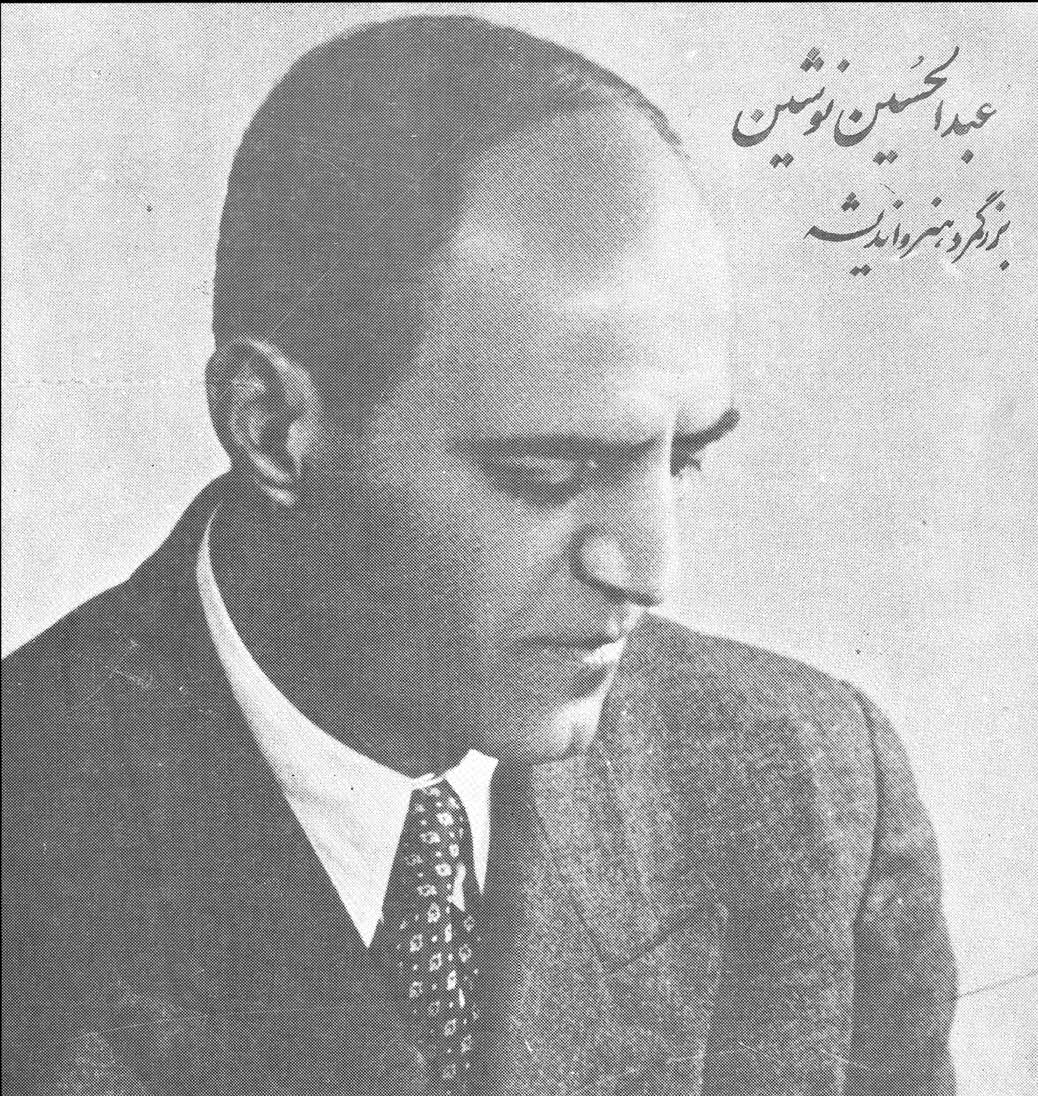
Abdol-Hossein Noushin

ʻAbdul-Ḥusayn Nūshīn Kohrāsāni (Persian: عبدالحسین نوشین; 11 February 1907 – 2 May 1971) was an Iranian playwright, theatre director and translator. He was one of the first people who introduced western style theatre to Iran.

He was also, along many other intellectuals and writers, one of the founders of the Tudeh Party of Iran.

== See also ==
- Persian theatre
- Ferdowsi Theatre
