= Nosrat Karimi =

Iranian actor (1924–2019)

Nosrat Karimi نصرت‌ کریمی
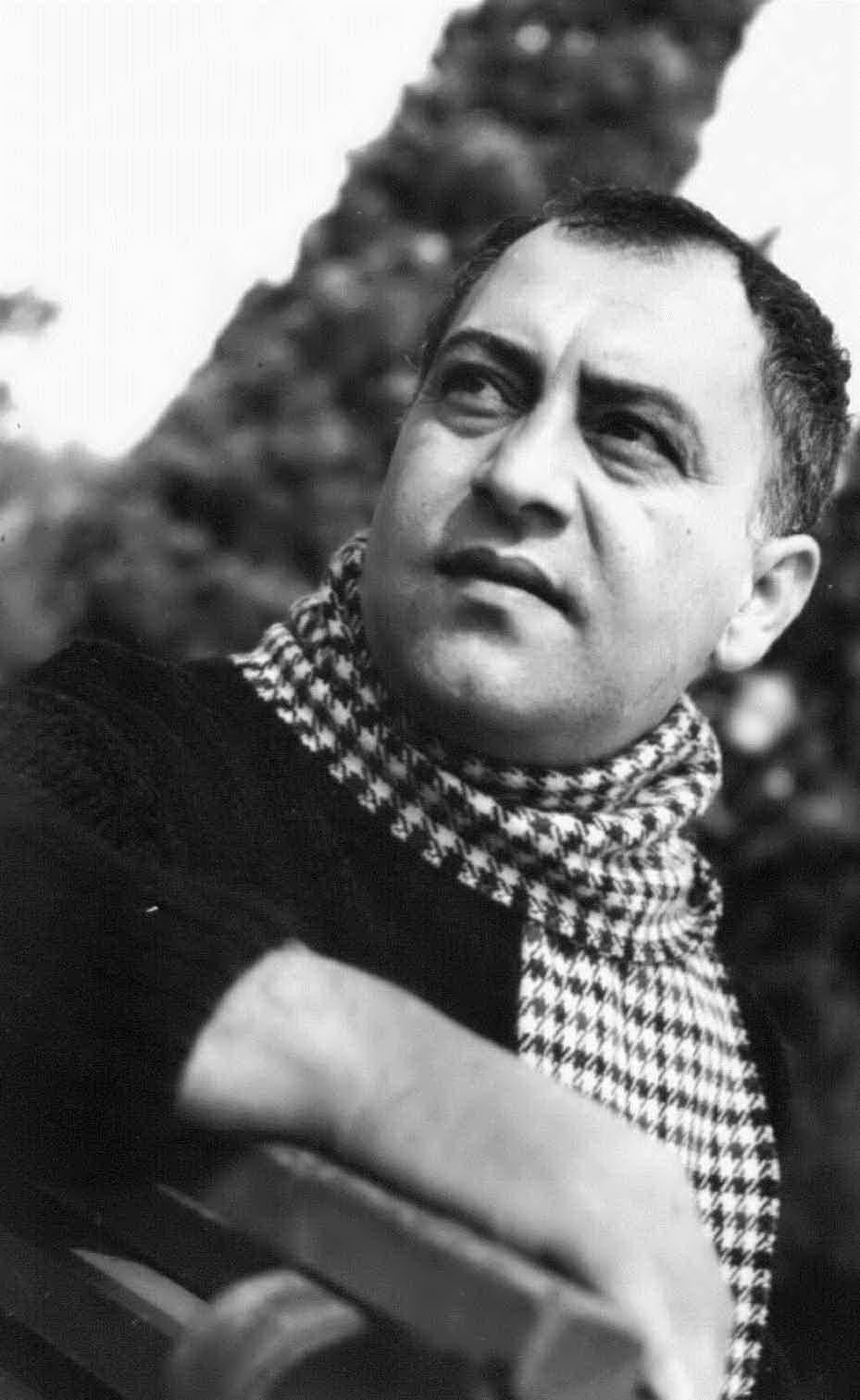
- Born: Nosratollah Karimi نصرت‌الله کریمی; 22 December 1924; Tehran, Iran
- Died: 3 December 2019 (aged 94); Tehran, Iran
- Resting place: Behesht-e Zahra Cemetery
- Occupations: Actor, Sculptor
- Years active: 1965–2019
- Spouse(s): A'lam Danayi (divorced); Parvin Teymouri
- Children: 3 (including Babak)
- Website: Official website

Nosrat Karimi (Persian: نصرت کریمی; 22 December 1924 – 3 December 2019) was an Iranian actor, director, make-up artist, professor, scriptwriter, and sculptor. His career spanned six decades. He was perhaps best known for his role as Agha Joon in My Uncle Napoleon and The Carriage Driver.

== Career ==
After finishing elementary school, Karimi attended the German Polytechnic Institute. He then registered at the only drama school existing at that time in Tehran. There from 1938 to 1941 he studied dramatic art, the art of make-up and stage design.

In 1940, Karimi worked as actor, make-up artist, and as stage designer in various Tehran theaters. At the beginning of 1953, Karimi travelled to Europe in order to complete his art degrees. In Rome, where he spent the first months of his stay, he became acquainted with famous Italian film directors Luchino Visconti and Vittorio De Sica. The neo-realistic films of De Sica ("The Bicycle Thief", "Miracle in Milan "... ) made an impression on him.

After approximately six months, Karimi traveled to Vienna and finally to Prague. There he studied film direction and TV production, specializing in puppet and animation movies. His most important teacher at The Academy of Arts in Prague was Karel Zeman, the famous Czech animation artist. After Prague, he returned to Rome and stayed there for three years. He worked as assistant director for Vittorio De Sica, performed on the stage, appeared in musicals and dubbed a number of Italian movies for distribution in Iran.

In 1964, after eleven years in Europe, Karimi went back to Iran. In 1965, he was engaged by The Ministry of Art and Culture to run and extend the state workshop for animated cartoons. A little later, Karimi began his activity as professor at The Faculty of Fine Arts at Tehran University, as well as at The Academy of the Dramatic Arts, where he taught different art styles for more than twenty years.

In the same period, Karimi produced two TV series: "Mr. Plaintiff", a puppet show and "The Marriage", a twenty-part family series about married life. Through these popular series, Karimi became known to a wide section of society of Iran.

In 1969, Karimi began shooting the film The Thief and the Policeman - a Persian adaptation of the story of cops and robbers. However, after having finished the film for the most part, he gave up the direction due to interference from the producer. In the same year, the British director Terence Young shot some scenes of the film Poppy is also a Flower in Iran. He engaged Karimi as make-up artist for his lead Yul Brynner and other actors.

From 1971 to 1973, Nosrat Karimi made three feature films: The Carriage Driver, The Solution and A Bed for Three where he not only acted as director, but also wrote the film scripts and played the title roles.

The Carriage Driver was a great success and went down well with the critics. This movie was chosen as the Iranian contribution for international film festivals. However, film authorities banned it from being shown abroad. Only years later could the film be performed in European cinemas. The internationally acclaimed Iranian director Abbas Kiarostami, honoured with The Golden Palm of Cannes 1997 and numerous other international motion picture awards, praised the film as an important work of the Iranian Cinema.

Karimi’s fame and great success resulted in attractive offers from many producers. Thus in the 1970s he played in a number of commercial films that were directed by others. He also played a supporting role in a Japanese-Iranian co-production. In 1975, the director and actor made his fourth and last movie The Miserable One. Again, he wrote the screenplay. The film, a satire about the mounting tensions in the 1970s in Tehran, went down well and received notable reviews.

In 1976, Karimi played one of the main characters of the TV series My Uncle Napoleon. This is regarded as the most successful series ever run on Iranian television. A year later, the artist produced the TV series Khosro Mirsa II. This 16-part series was a grotesque comedy about an aristocratic family descended from the Qajar dynasty. He then wrote another film script and was preparing his next movie, but for the time being film production was stopped during the Iranian Revolution.

== After the Revolution ==
After the Iranian Revolution Karimi was banned, for a long period, from working as a filmmaker or actor. During that time, he rediscovered his former interest for making sculptures. He made many mimic-sculptures which were shown in numerous national and international exhibitions. In addition, Karimi wrote a number of screenplays for movie and TV productions; a few of them were commercialized under the name of others and others have not been realized until this day.

Not until 1987, was Karimi allowed to perform a puppet piece again – The Uninvited Visitor. Then, he made the animated cartoon Playmate. In 1996/97, he produced for a private channel the puppet show Unruly, a TV series that has been re-run repeatedly at the request of the spectators. His other works in the post-revolutionary era include the production and direction of a series of short TV films about pollution control and health care, as well as books about theatre and cinema. Nosrat Karimi lived with his wife Parvin Teymouri in the north of Tehran.

== Filmography ==
- Nikah Halala (1971) – writer, actor, and director
- Golgo 13 (film) (1973) - actor
- My Uncle Napoleon (1976) – actor
