= Evgenii Eduardovich Bertels =

Soviet-Russian orientalist (1890–1957)

- Bertels, the latter part of his life
- Born: 25 December 1890; Saint Petersburg, Russian Empire
- Died: 7 October 1957 (aged 66); Moscow, Soviet Union
- Resting place: Novodevichy Cemetery
- Occupations: Orientalist, Professor of Persian language and literature at the Leningrad State University
- Spouse: Vera Vasilievna
- Awards: Order of Lenin Order of the Red Banner of Labour
Further information
Academic background
Education	Saint Petersburg Imperial University · Petrograd Conservatory · Petrograd State University
Academic work
Institutions	Asiatic Museum, later the Institute of Oriental Studies of USSR Academy of Sciences
Main interests	Persian literature · Turkic literature · Sufism and Sufi literature · Islamic Studies

Evgenii Eduardovich Bertels or Berthels (Russian: Евге́ний Эдуа́рдович Берте́льс, romanized: Evgeniĭ Ėduardovich Bertel's; December 25, (Note: "In 1918, after the Revolution, Lenin raised the question of calendar reform and, after an investigation of the subject, published a decree directing the adoption of the Gregorian style "for the purpose of being in harmony with all the civilized countries of the world" → Achelis, Elisabeth (1954). "Russia's Difficulties". Home Page for Calendar Reform. Rick McCarty. Therefore, some sources give Bertels's day of birth as the 13th of December, according to Julian calendar.) 1890—October 7, 1957); (Note: The variant of his first name, that one finds on the internet, is either due to literate pronunciation, or different languages and dialects, e.g.: Eugene (Ukrainian), Evgeny (Kazakhian), Yevgani (Persian), Yevgeni (Azerbaijanian), Yevgeniy (Armenian) ... etc.; the preference of his name—given above, is based on Romanization of his name, Osmanov 1970–1979 and Zand 1989.) (Note: He signed his articles in the first edition of Encyclopaedia of Islam as "E. Berthels," perhaps due to his Germanic ancestry; e.g. → Berthels, E. (1913–1936). "Ras̲h̲īd al-Dīn Ṭabīb". In Martijn Theodoor Houtsma; et al. (eds.). Encyclopaedia of Islam. Vol. III (1st ed.). Leiden: Brill. pp. 1124a–1125a. doi:10.1163/2214-871X_ei1_SIM_3681. ISBN 90-04-08265-4.; Zand 1989 give the same surname. The preference of his surname is based on Romanization and Osmanov 1970–1979.) was a Soviet-Russian Orientalist, Iranologist and Turkologist, Professor of the Leningrad State University, correspondent member of the Academy of Sciences of the USSR (1939), Academy of Persian Language and Literature (1944), Academy of Sciences of Turkmenistan (1951), and Arab Academy of Damascus (1955). In the 1930s–1950s, he was the head of the Soviet School of Persian and Central Asian Turkic Studies. In 1942, during World War II, or the Great Patriotic War, and the Siege of Leningrad, Bertels was evacuated with the Institute of Oriental Studies of the USSR Academy of Sciences from Leningrad (Saint Petersburg) to Tashkent, and later to Moscow, and Bertels moved to permanent residence in Moscow until his death.

== Life and education ==
After a short-lived interest in Entomology, Bertels went into Legal Studies, graduating from the Saint Petersburg Imperial University, Faculty of Law (1914), and in 1918 he received a higher musical education at Petrograd Conservatory, graduating in 1920. But his genuine interest was Oriental Studies, so he taught himself Persian and Turkic languages, and in 1918 he became a student of the Oriental Department of the Petrograd State University—later renamed as Leningrad State University, where his teachers were Aleksandr A. Romaskevich, Alexander Freiman, Vasily Bartold, and Sergey Oldenburg. Bertels first academic appointment, in 1920, was at the Asiatic Museum, later the Institute of Oriental Studies of USSR Academy of Sciences, where he worked till his death. Bertels was arrested in 1925 after allegations that he was a French spy, he was released due to the mediation of his colleagues. But psychologically Bertels was broken, and it seems he was forced to collaborate with the GPU by providing them with information about his colleagues.

In 1928, on Bartold's recommendation, he became a professor of Persian language and literature at the Leningrad State University— former Petrograd State University, and during the 1930s–1950s, he was the mentor of most Soviet Union, and Azerbaijanian researchers of Persian and Muslim Turkic literature, his renowned Azerbaijanian disciple was Azada Rustamova (1932–2005) who later became leading Azerbaijanian orientalists and Turkologists. (Note: A brief biography of Azade Rustamova, is on the "Azerbaijan National Academy of Science" webpage.) He was arrested again in 1941 along with his son, Dmitrii, for anti-Soviet activities. However, Bertels was then suddenly released, and he was later awarded several Soviet decorations. After the death of Stalin, Bertels became one of the first Soviet Orientalists to participate in conferences and to publish abroad. He died in 1957, and is buried in Novodevichy Cemetery.

Like most Orientalists, nothing is known about his personal life, he married Vera Vasilievna (1892–1969) before 1917, (Note: There is no official record of the date of their marriage, but their first son was born in 1917.) and they had two sons, the Arabist and Iranist Dmitrii Evgenievich (1917–2005), (Note: A brief bio–bibliographical note on Dmitrii, in Russian, is available at orientalstudies.ru.) he was arrested in 1941 along with his father, for anti-Soviet activities, and in 1949 he was behind bars but was later released, and Andrei Evgenievich (1928–1995), also an Orientalist, (Note: One of his works, Nasir Khusraw and Ismailism (Nasir-i Khosrov i Ismailizm), was translated into Persian → Bertels, A.Y. (1968). Nasir Khusraw va Esmailiyan (ناصر خسرو و اسماعیلیان). Translated by Yahya Aryanpour. Tehran: Bonyade Farhange Iran. $\mathrm{N}\!\!\mathrm{B}$: at CiNii, this book is incorrectly listed among E.E. Bertels works.) who after his father's death, published Bertels' "Selected Writings" (Izbrannye trudy). (Note: Under a photograph of Bertels' gravestone, at novodevichiynecropol, the name and date of the birth and death of his wife and son—Andrei, who are buried alongside him—is written.)

== Achievement and works ==
Bertels started his career by partial translations of Persian Classical Literature into Russian his first published work was a selected translation of Sadi's Gulistan in 1922, in 1923 selected translation of the works of Attar's Bulbul-nama and Nizami Ganjavi's Haft Peykar, latter translated parts of Nasir Khusraw's Safarnama, and a complete translation of Sanai's Sayr al-‛Ibād Ilā’l-Ma‛ād, among many other translations. Bertels was one of the authors of the first edition of Encyclopaedia of Islam (1913–1938), and wrote many articles on Islamic literature and culture in the Great Soviet Encyclopedia. From 1923 through 1929 Bertels published twenty-seven articles in the field of Sufi studies (republished in the III volume of his "Selected Writings"), his works on Sufism are regarded as classics in the studies of Sufism in Russia, although, he is not among the greats like Hellmut Ritter, Louis Massignon or Henry Corbin.

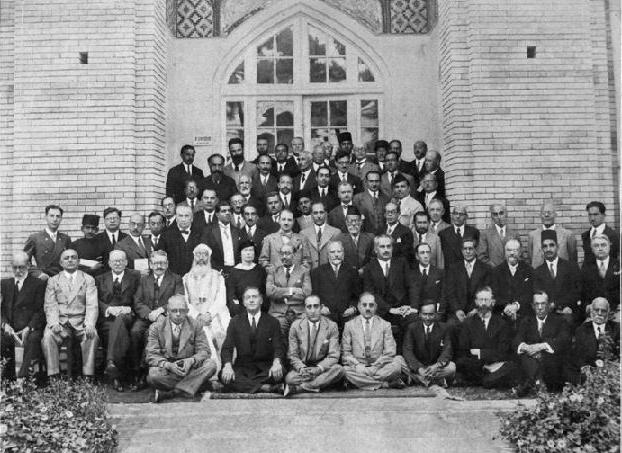
Ferdowsi Millenary Congress, Tehran 1934. From right to left, Second row (seated), 5th person is Bertels.

In 1934, on the occasion of the Ferdowsi Millennial Celebration, held in Persia, the Soviet Union sent the largest delegation, Bertels delivered a lecture in Persian, on Yazdan (i.e., God, or a divine entity) and Ahriman (i.e., Satan, or a demonic entity) in Shahnameh. (Note: Sahab personally attended Bertels' lecture, according to him, Bertels spoke Persian well, clearly, and fluently.) In 1935, he wrote a small popular monograph on Ferdowsi (Abu-l-Kasim Ferdovsi i Ego Tvorchestovo; "Firdowsi and His Poetry"), translated into Persian by S. Izadi. His monograph on Nizami was published originally as articles, and treatises, between 1939 and 1956, and in its entirety five years after Bertels' death, (Note: For Bertels' extensive studies on Nizami Ganjavi, that were to serve the ideological standards governing USSR → Bagirov 2020, passim; Lornejad, Siavash; Doostzadeh, Ali (2012). Arakelova, Victoria (ed.). On the Modern Politicization of the Persian Poet Nezami Ganjavi (PDF). Yerevan: Caucasian Centre for Iranian Studies. ISBN 978-99930-69-74-4.) his last visit to Persia was on the occasion of Avicenna Millenary Congress, 21–30 April 1954. Bertels' chief achievements was introducing Persian classics to Russian readers, the editor's preface to the first volume of Bertels' Selected Writings states: "Bertels literally lived by the creations of the luminaries of Persian poetry, and over 150 of his 295 works were related to Persian literature or language."

Bertel's preparation of a new critical edition of Nizami's Panj Ganj, and his critical edition of Ferdowsi's Shahnameh, must also be mentioned. Bertels and a group of collaborators began preparing a critical edition of Nizami's works in 1941, a critical text of the Iskandarnameh was published in 1947 in two parts: Sharafnameh, for which Berthels and A.A. Alizada were awarded the State Stalin Prize, and Eqbalnameh; no other critical text was published during Bertels' lifetime. His critical edition of Ferdowsi's Shahnameh had the same faith, he edited two volumes, both published after his death in 1960 and 1962, the whole nine-volume edition was completed in 1971 under the editorship of Abdolhossein Noushin, and became the standard edition of Shahnameh, prior to Djalal Khaleghi-Motlagh edition (1990–2008). (Note: Khaleghi-Motlagh's second revised edition, in 12 volumes, was published in Tehran (2018).)

After his death, his son Andrei provided his father's papers for publication, and a group of Bertels' former colleagues and students edited and organized Bertels' Selected Writings (Izbrannye trudy), it was supposed to be published in VI volumes, but ended in V volumes, as follows: [I] Istoriya persidsko-tadzhikskoĭ literatury (History of Persian–Tajik Literature), (Note: Read: History of Greater Persia Literature, many of them neither lived in the present day Iran nor Tajikistan, e.g., Unsuri, or Sanai.) this volume was translated into Persian by S. Izadi, in two parts. (Note: Part I: Izadi, Sirus (1995). Tarikh Adabiyate Farsi (تاریخ ادبیات فارسی / History of Persian Literature). Tehran: Entesharate Hirmand. ISBN 964-5521-50-5.; Part II: Izadi, Sirus (1996). Tarikh Adabiyate Farsi: Az Doran Ferdowsi Ta Ahde Saljuqian (تاریخ ادبیات فارسی: از دوران فردوسی تا عهد سلجوقیان / History of Persian Literature: From Ferdowsi's Time till Seljuk Era). Tehran: Entesharate Hirmand.) [II] Nizami i Fuzuli (On Nizami and Fuzuli), [III] Sufizm i sifiĭskaya literatura (Sufism and Sufi Literature), was also translated into Persian by S. Izadi. [IV] Navoi i Dzhami (On Navai and Jami). [V] Istoriya literatury i kultury Irana (History of Persian Literature and Culture). Volumes I-IV appeared in 1960–1965, volume V, published 1988. Bertels was awarded the Order of the Red Banner of Labor in 1945, the Order of Lenin, and a medal.

== See also ==
- Campaign on granting Nizami the status of the national poet of Azerbaijan

== Bibliography ==
- Bagirov, Abuzar M. (2020). "The Role of the Russian Orientalist Y. E. Bertels in the Formation of the Azerbaijan Literary Scene in Moscow" (PDF). Astra Salvensis. II (Supplement, no. 1): 731–751.
- Izadi, Sirus (1977). Tasawwuf Va Adabiyat Tasawwuf (Sufism and Sufi Literature/Sufizm i sifiĭskaya literatura) (in Persian). Tehran: Entesharate Amir Kabir.
- Keyvani, Majdodin (2002). "Bertels". In Kazem Mousavi-Bojnourdi (ed.). Dā'erat-ol-Ma'āref-e Bozorg-e Eslāmi (in Persian). Vol. XI. Tehran: Center for the Great Islamic Encyclopedia. pp. 672a–673b. ISBN 964-7025-07-6.
- Meshkin-nedjad, Parviz, ed. (2003). Orientalists: Iranists and Islamists, Their Bibliography and Biography (in Persian). Vol. II. Tehran: Institute for Humanities and Cultural Studies. pp. 201b–216a. ISBN 964-426-193-3.
- Muslmani Ghobadiani, Rahim (1997). "Bertels". In Gholam-Ali Haddad-Adel (ed.). Encyclopaedia of the World of Islam (in Persian). Vol. III. Tehran: Encyclopaedia Islamica Foundation. pp. 3a–4b. ISBN 964-447-003-6.
- Osmanov, N.M. (1970–1979). "Evgenii Eduardovich Bertels". The Great Soviet Encyclopedia, 3rd Edition, The Gale Group, Inc. The Free Dictionary.
- Rodionov, Mikhail (2011). "Profiles under pressure: Orientalists in Petrograd/ Leningrad, 1918–1956". In Michael Kemper; Stephan Conermann (eds.). The Heritage of Soviet Oriental Studies. Routledge Contemporary Russia and Eastern Europe Series. London & New York: Routledge. pp. 47–57. doi:10.4324/9780203832752-9. ISBN 978-0-203-83275-2.
- Sahab, Abolghassem (1978) [1940]. Farhang Khavarshenasan (Dictionary of Orientalists) (in Persian) (2nd Revised ed.). Tehran: Sahab Publishing. pp. 64–65.
- Shahbazi, A.S. (January 26, 2012). Ehsan Yarshater (ed.). "Ferdowsi, Abu'l-Qāsem IV. Millenary Celebration". Encyclopædia Iranica. Encyclopædia Iranica Foundation.
- Tabatabaie, Mostafa H. (1997). Naghde Asare Khavarshenasan (Criticism of Orientalism Works) (in Persian). Tehran: Chapakhsh.
- Zand, Michael (December 15, 1989). Ehsan Yarshater (ed.). "Berthels, Evgeniĭ Èduardovich". Encyclopædia Iranica. Encyclopædia Iranica Foundation.

=== Further reading ===
- Azamat, Nihat (1992). "Berthels, Evgenii Èduardoviç". TDV İslâm Ansiklopedisi (in Turkish). TDV İslâm Araştırmaları Merkezi.

=== External links ===
- One of Bertels' treatise on Nizami: Бертельс Е.Э. Великий азербайджанский поэт Низами: Эпоха - жизнь - творчество. (1940)
- PDFs of all five volumes of Bertels' "Selected Writings" at ru:Бертельс, Евгений Эдуардович.
- Some of Bertels' works, published between 1923 and 1971, are available at "Oriental Studies.ru".
