= Avestan studies =

Subfield of linguistics

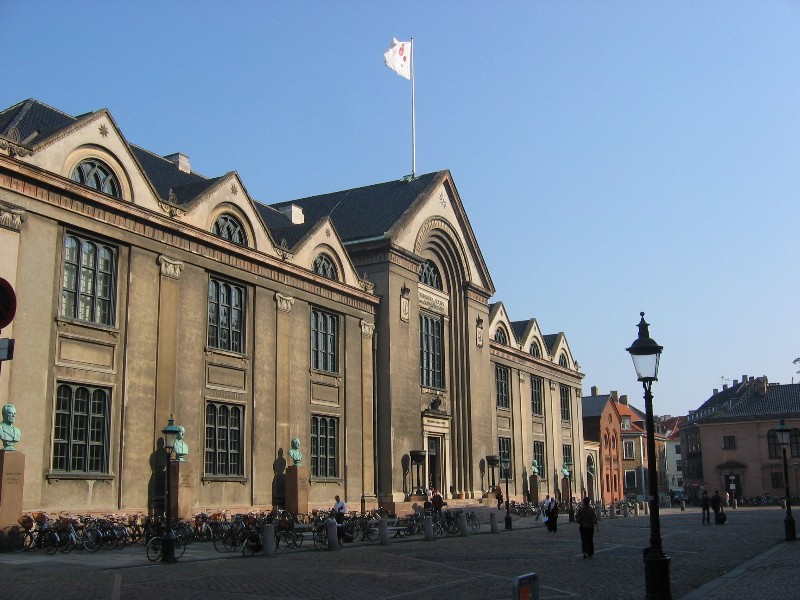
- University of Copenhagen, an important early center for Avestan studies
- Field: Historical linguistics, Comparative linguistics, Zoroastrianism, History of Iran
- Origin: Late 18th century Europe
- Key people: James Darmesteter, Karl Friedrich Geldner, Helmut Humbach

Avestan studies is the investigation of the Avesta, i.e., the collection of Zoroastrian texts, and the Avestan language, in which those texts are composed. It is an interdisciplinary field combining Indo-European linguistics, comparative philology, Zoroastrian studies and Iranian history.

== Overview ==
Avestan is the oldest attested Iranian language and one of the oldest of any Indo-European languages. It is attested through the Avesta, the collection of religious literature of Zoroastrianism. Like Vedic Sanskrit, which is named after the Vedas, the Avestan corpus is identical with the Avesta, and is therefore named after the text corpus in which it is used. These texts represent an important source for the reconstruction of Proto-Indo-Iranian and Proto-Indo-European language, culture and history. Avestan studies, therefore, has a close relationship to Indo-European linguists and Zoroastrian studies.

Compared to related fields, Avestan studies has a number of challenges. First, compared to the closely related Vedic corpus, the Old Avestan layer is comparably small, leading to a number of hapax legomena. Second, there is no direct descendant of Avestan, which limits the number of reliable cognates. Third, the transmission of the corpus was purely oral for a long time, which creates a large gap between their composition and production of the written sources.

== Zoroastrian scholarship ==
The earliest attempts of scholarly interpretation of the Avesta are found in Zoroastrianism itself, where a long tradition of exegesis exists. The largest sources of this tradition are the exegetical translations and commentaries of the Avesta, known as Zend. This tradition flourished particularly during the Sasanian Empire period, when the Sasanian Avesta comprised not only the Avestan text but a large Middle Persian Zend. However, after the Islamic conquest of Iran and the subsequent marginalization of Zoroastrianism, this exegetical tradition began to deteriorate and most of the exegetical texts were lost. In the 17th and 18th century, when western scholars came into contact with the Zoroastrian community, knowledge of the Avestan language had become severely diminished.

== Modern scholarship ==
=== Beginnings ===
Western scholars only became aware of Zoroastrian texts in the 17 and 18th century through contacts of European merchants and travellers with the Parsis, the community of Zoroastrians in India. Soon, a number of Avestan manuscripts were purchased and collections established in Europe. The first such collection was created by Thomas Hyde at the end of the 17th century, with other important collections being established by Abraham Hyacinthe Anquetil-Duperron, Samuel Guise and Rasmus Rask.

Anquetil-Duperron also published a French translation of the Avestan texts he had acquired in 1771, based on translations provided by a Parsi priest. This translation became the topic of the first dispute in Avestan studies, when a number of scholars, in particular William Jones, accused his work of being a forgery. His translation was, however, eventually vindicated by Tychsen and Heeren. Avestan studies, as a scholarly field was founded with the work of Rask and Burnouf.

=== Golden Age - second half of the 19th century ===
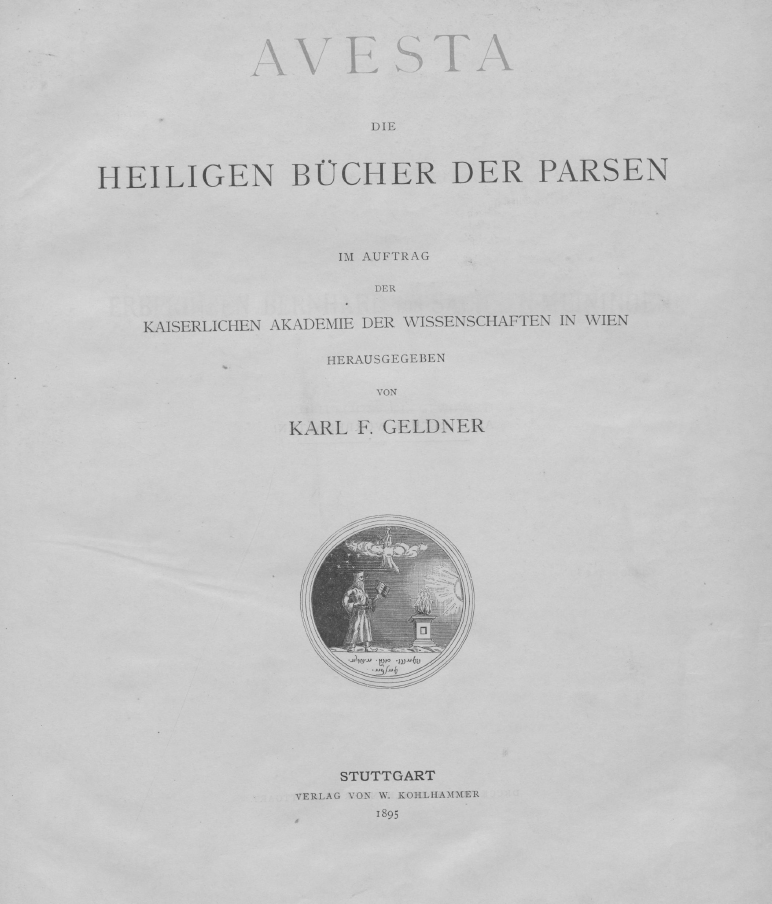
Geldner's edition of the Avesta is widely considered to be a seminal achievement of Avestan studies

The second half of the 19th century is regarded as one of the most important phases in the history of Avestan studies. It saw the publication of all critical editions of the Avestan corpus. The first one was published in 1852 by Westergaard, followed in 1853–1858 by Spiegel and finally between 1886 -1895 by Geldner's edition. Bartholomae's work, in particular his Altiranisches Wörterbuch, grounded the Old Iranian languages like Old Persian and Avestan within the framework of Indo-European linguistics. This period was also marked by disputes by the so-called traditional school and the Vedic school. Whereas the former believed in the use of Zoroastrian scholarship expressed in the Zend, the latter relied on an etymological approach by comparison with the more abundant Vedic material. The achievements of this period are so important that, even more than a century later, Geldner's edition of the Avesta and Bartholomae's Altiranisches Wörterbuch are still foundational works of Avestan studies.

=== Stagnation - first half of the 20th century ===
The first half of the 20th century is largely seen as lost decades during which Avestan studies stagnated in comparison to other fields of Indo-European studies. Progress was only isolated and incremental. This was due to the, ultimately wrong, theory introduced in 1902 by Friedrich Carl Andreas. According to this theory, the extant Avestan texts were "a clumsy transcription" from a Parthian-era collection written in Pahlavi script. The aim of Avestan studies should therefore be to restore the hypothesized Parthian Archetype of the extant manuscript tradition. The theory gradually lost support due to the works of Henning, Bailey, and Morgenstierne. It was eventually abandoned in the 1950s after Karl Hoffmann demonstrated that the inconsistencies noted by Andreas were actually due to unconscious alterations introduced by oral transmission.

=== Renewal - second half of the 20th century ===
The post war period in Avestan studies was characterized by a renewal of the philological approach to the Avesta, based on the works of Hoffmann and continued by his pupil Narten. Their combined work has established the phonetic value of the Avestan script and led to a substantial number of new editions for individual texts of the Avestan corpus. Furthermore, Humbach has been instrumental in applying the methods of textual criticism to the interpretation of the Avestan texts themselves. He also changed the interpretation of the Gathas. According to him, they are not sermons where Zarathustra addresses to his followers but hymns where he worships Ahura Mazda.

=== Recent trends ===
The last decades have seen a number of changes in Avestan studies. One is the discovery of a large number of hitherto unknown manuscripts, primarily from Iran. Another change concerns the re-evaluation of the liturgical aspects of the Avesta and the role of Zarathustra. As a result, the surviving Avestan texts are nowadays seen as witnesses of a living liturgical tradition and should be edited as such. These developments led to the creation of the Corpus Avesticum Berolinense (CAB), a project which attempts to edit the manuscripts within their original ritual context.

== Centers ==
Modern Avestan studies is a subfield of Iranian studies. Important centers are Harvard University, SOAS University of London, University of Hamburg, Collège de France, Leiden University and University of Mumbai. In addition, a large number of Avestan manuscripts are available in Indian, Iranian and Western libraries as well as private collections of Zoroastrian priestly families. Anquetil-Duperron's manuscripts are now at the Bibliothèque nationale de France, while the Codex Hafnienses (mostly collected by Rask) is now at the Royal Library in Denmark. Other important examples are K. R. Cama Oriental Institute library in Mumbai, the Meherji Rana library in Navsari, the British Library in London, the Bodleian Library in Oxford and the Bavarian State Library in Munich.

== Notable scholars ==
- Christian Bartholomae
- Mary Boyce
- Maneckji Nusserwanji Dhalla
- James Darmesteter
- Karl Friedrich Geldner
- Almut Hintze
- Karl Hoffmann
- Helmut Humbach
- Jean Kellens
- Philip G. Kreyenbroek
- Prods Oktor Skjaervo
- Friedrich von Spiegel
- Ahmad Tafazzoli
- Edward William West
- Niels Ludvig Westergaard
- Ehsan Yarshater

== Important works ==
=== Editions of the Avesta ===
- Geldner, Karl F. (1885). Geldner, Karl F. (ed.). Avesta: die heiligen Bücher der Parsen I: Prolegomena, Yasna. Stuttgart: Kohlhammer. doi:10.25673/100265.
- Geldner, Karl F. (1889). Avesta: die heiligen Bücher der Parsen II: Vispered und Khorde Avesta. Stuttgart: Kohlhammer. doi:10.25673/100261.
- Geldner, Karl F. (1895). Avesta: die heiligen Bücher der Parsen III: Vendidad. Stuttgart: Kohlhammer. doi:10.25673/100264.
- von Spiegel, Friedrich (1853). Avesta, die heiligen Schriften der Parsen. Zum ersten Male im Grundtexte sammt der Huzvaresch-Übersetzung - I. Band: Der Vendidad. Wien: Kais. Kön. Hof- und Staatsdruckerei.
- von Spiegel, Friedrich (1858). Avesta, die heiligen Schriften der Parsen. Zum ersten Male im Grundtexte sammt der Huzvaresch-Übersetzung - II. Band: Die Visperad und die Yasna (PDF). Wien: Kais. Kön. Hof- und Staatsdruckerei.
- Westergaard, Niels L. (1852). Zendavesta: or The religious books of the Zoroastrians. Copenhagen: Berling brothers.

=== Translations of the Avesta ===
- Darmesteter, James (1880). Müller, Max (ed.). The Zend-Avesta Part I: The Vendidad. Sacred Books of the East. Vol. 4. Oxford: Claredon Press.
- Darmesteter, James (1883). Müller, Max (ed.). The Zend-Avesta Part II: The Sirozahs, Yasts and Nyayis. Sacred Books of the East. Vol. 23. Dehli: Motilal Banarsidass Publishers.
- Mills, Lawrence H. (1887). Müller, Max (ed.). The Zend-Avesta Part III: The Yasna, Visparad, Afrinagan, Gahs, and Miscellaneous Fragments. Sacred Books of the East. Vol. 31. Oxford: Claredon Press.
- Darmesteter, James (1892a). Le Zend-Avesta: Traduction nouvelle avec commentaire historique et philologique; Vol I: La liturgie (Yasna et Vispéred). Paris: E. Leroux.
- Darmesteter, James (1892b). Le Zend-Avesta: Traduction nouvelle avec commentaire historique et philologique; Vol. II: La Loi (Vendidad); L'Épopée (Yashts); Le Livre de Prière (Khorda Avesta). Paris: E. Leroux.
- Darmesteter, James (1893). Le Zend-Avesta: traduction nouvelle avec commentaire historique et philologique. Vol III: Origines de la littérature et de la religion zoroastriennes: appendice à la traduction de l'Avesta (fragments des Nasks perdus et index). Paris: E. Leroux.
- Wolff, Fritz (1910). Avesta. Die heiligen Bücher der Parsen. Übersetzt auf der Grundlage von Christian Bartholomaes Altiranischem Wörterbuch. Straßburg: K. J. Trübner.
