= Romanization of Bulgarian =

Transliteration of Bulgarian text

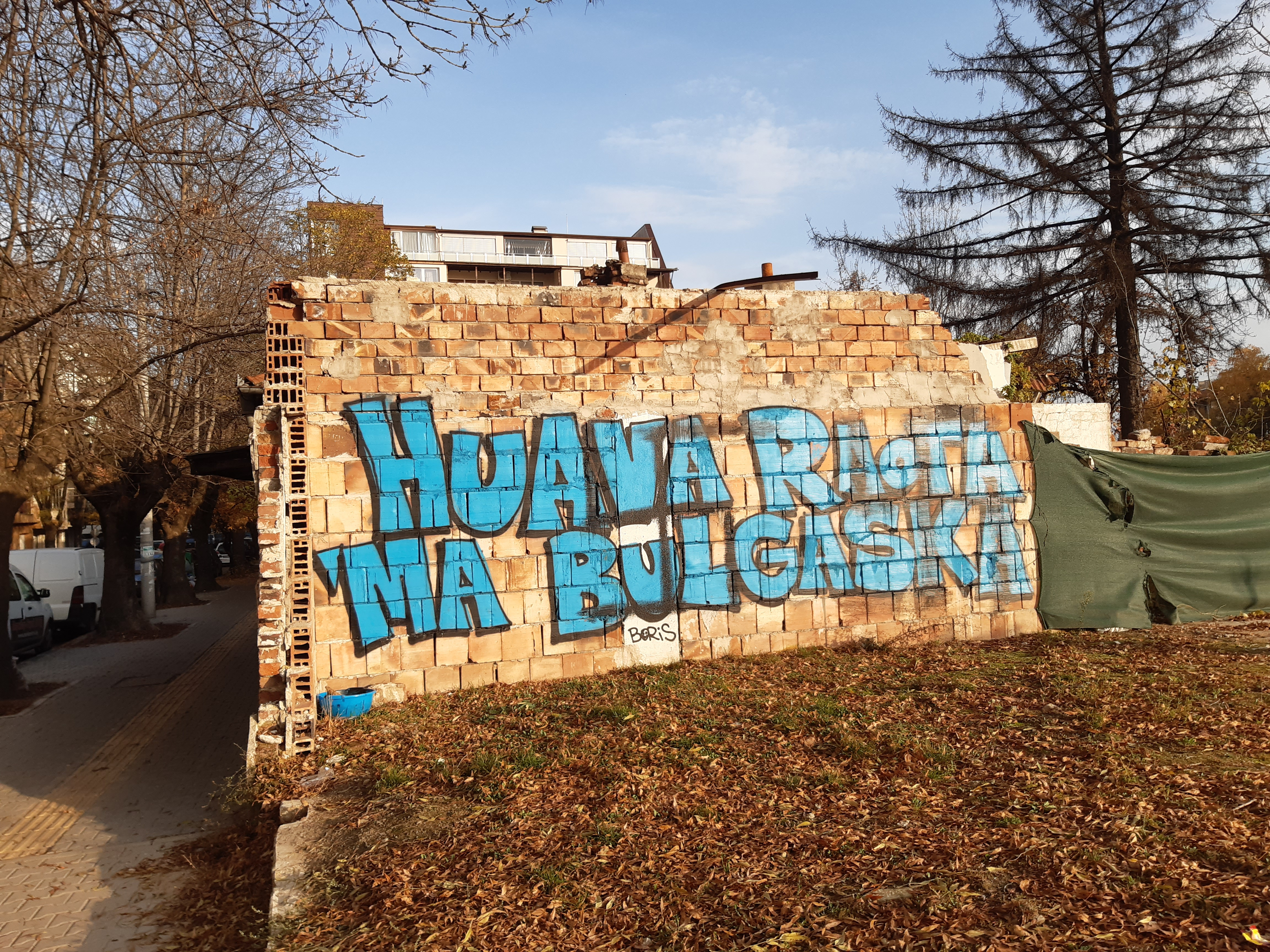
- Graffiti by the artist Good Guy Boris in Krasno Selo declaring Huava Raota 'ma Bulgaska ('Great work, but it's Bulgarian') in romanized Bulgarian, 2022
- Period: 19th century – present
- Official script: Latin
- Languages: Bulgarian

Romanization of Bulgarian is the practice of transliteration of text in Bulgarian from its conventional Cyrillic orthography into the Latin alphabet. Romanization can be used for various purposes, such as rendering of proper names and place names in foreign-language contexts, or for informal writing of Bulgarian in environments where Cyrillic is not easily available. Official use of romanization by Bulgarian authorities is found, for instance, in identity documents and in road signage. Several different standards of transliteration exist, one of which was chosen and made mandatory for common use by the Bulgarian authorities in a law of 2009.

== Features ==
The various romanization systems differ with respect to 12 out of the 30 letters of the modern Bulgarian alphabet. The remaining 18 have consistent mappings in all romanization schemes: а→a, б→b, в→v, г→g, д→d, е→e, з→z, и→i, к→k, л→l, м→m, н→n, о→o, п→p, р→r, с→s, т→t, ф→f. Differences exist with respect to the following:

- letters involving the glide sound /j/, where some systems use Latin ⟨j⟩ and some Latin ⟨y⟩: й→j/y, ю→ju/yu, я→ja/ya; also ь→'/j/y.
- letters denoting palatal/alveolar fricatives and affricates. Here, the choice is mostly between Latin letters with diacritics, as used in many Latin-based orthographies of other Slavic languages, and digraph combinations, as used in English: ж→ž/zh, ч→č/ch, ш→š/sh, щ→št/ŝ/sht. Also, Cyrillic x may be rendered as either ⟨h⟩, ⟨x⟩ or ⟨kh⟩, and Cyrillic ц as either ⟨c⟩ or ⟨ts⟩. The rendering of щ as ⟨št⟩ or ⟨sht⟩ is specific to Bulgarian and differs from the conventions for the East Slavic languages, where it is rendered mostly as ⟨šč⟩ or ⟨shch⟩.
- the letter ъ, which in Bulgarian (unlike Russian, where it is not pronounced at all) denotes a special schwa-like vowel. This sound, which occurs in the first syllable of the country name Bulgaria (България), is variously rendered as ⟨ă⟩, ⟨ŭ⟩, ⟨a⟩, ⟨u⟩, or, in more extreme cases, ⟨y⟩ or ⟨ə⟩. Moreover, Cyrillic у, which is mostly rendered as Latin ⟨u⟩, is sometimes rendered instead as ⟨ou⟩ to distinguish it from ъ, for example in the Danchev Romanization system and based on historical etymology (i.e., the fact that Cyrillic у was descended from Uk, as well as the fact that ⟨ou⟩ denotes the u sound in French orthography, and therefore the old French-oriented transliteration used it for у as well.

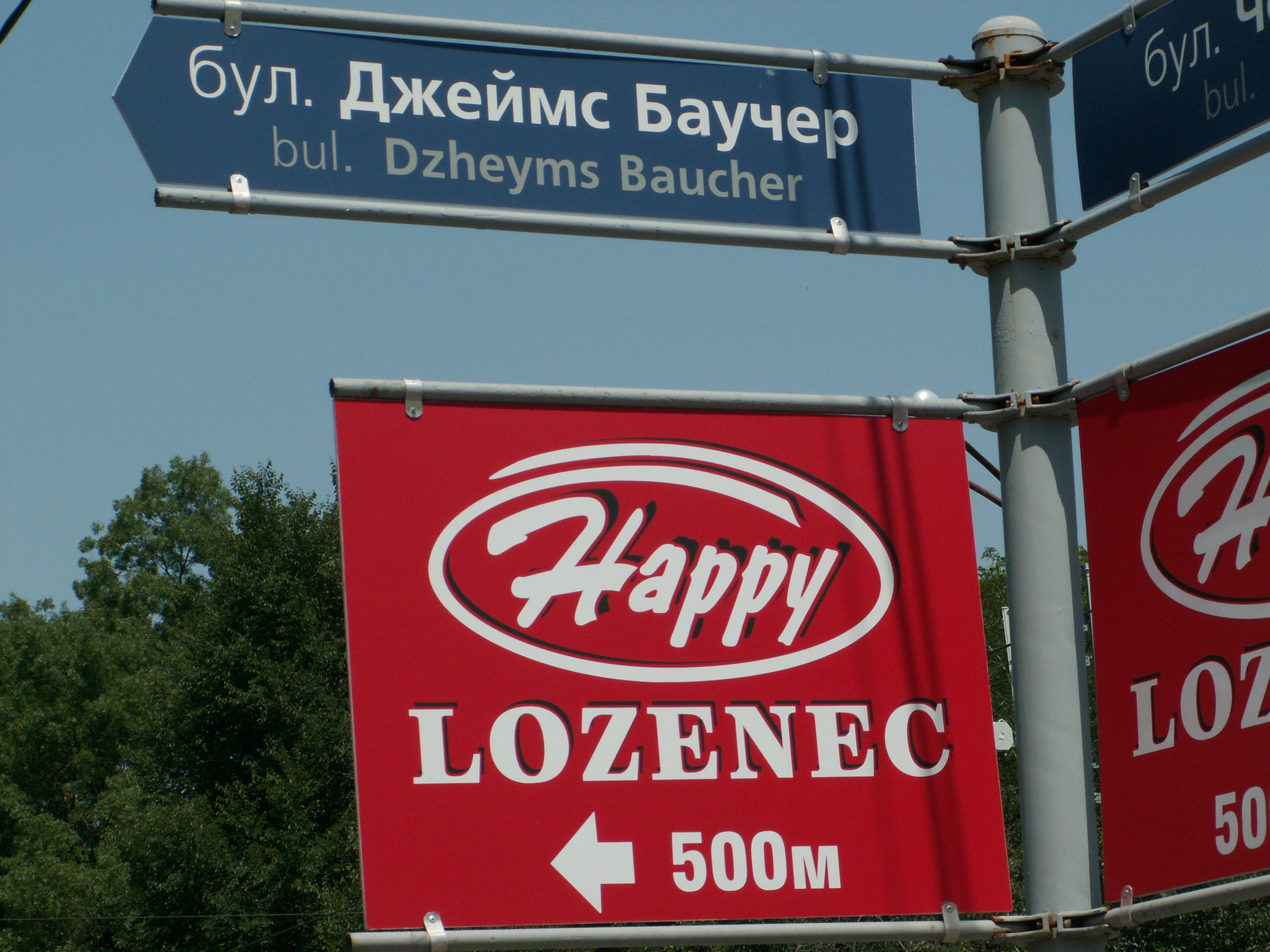
The new system is not always used properly. One of these signposts in Sofia shows the name of the district of Lozenets written according to the international scientific system of transliteration (c = ts), but in the other the name of the Irish journalist James Bourchier has been "relatinized" according to the official Bulgarian system (Dzheyms Baucher), even though the system does not apply to names that have authentic Roman spellings.

== Standards ==
Three different systems have been adopted officially by Bulgarian authorities at overlapping times.

=== ISO/R 9:1968 ===
An older system in the tradition of common Slavic scientific transliteration was adopted by the Council of Orthography and Transcription of Geographical Names in Sofia in 1972 and subsequently by the UN in 1977. It is identical to that codified in the ISO norm ISO/R 9:1968. This system uses diacritic letters (⟨č, š, ž⟩) as well as ⟨j⟩ and ⟨c⟩. It was adopted in 1973 as the Bulgarian state standard BDS 1596:1973 which, although still valid formally is no longer used in practice, having been superseded by the 2009 Transliteration Act.

=== French-oriented ===
The second system was a French-oriented transliteration of personal and place names in the documents issued by the Bulgarian Ministry of Interior for travel abroad, used until 1999.

=== English-oriented digraph systems ===
Systems based on a radically different principle, which avoids diacritics and is optimized for compatibility with English sound-letter correspondences, have come into official use in Bulgaria since the mid-1990s. These systems characteristically use ⟨ch, sh, zh⟩ rather than ⟨č, š, ž⟩, and ⟨y⟩ rather than ⟨j⟩.

==== Danchev ====
One such system was proposed in Danchev et al.'s English Dictionary of Bulgarian Names of 1989.

==== Streamlined System ====
A similar system (differing from the former in the treatment of letters ъ, у, and digraphs ай, ей, ой and уй), called the "Streamlined System" by Ivanov (2003) and Gaidarska (1998), was adopted in 1995 for use in Bulgarian-related place names in Antarctica by the Antarctic Place-names Commission of Bulgaria. Another system along similar lines, differing from the Antarctic one only in the treatment of ц (⟨ts⟩ vs. ⟨c⟩), was adopted by the Bulgarian authorities for use in identity documents in 1999; after an amendment in 2000, the official Bulgarian system became identical with that of the Antarctica Commission.

The new official Bulgarian system does not allow for unambiguous mapping back into Cyrillic, since unlike most other systems it does not distinguish between ъ and а (both rendered as a). It also does not distinguish between the digraph values of ⟨zh=ж⟩, ⟨sh=ш⟩ and the value of the same Roman strings in rendering accidental clusters of separate Cyrillic letters ⟨zh=зх⟩ and ⟨sh=сх⟩, as they occur in words like изход (izhod) or схема (shema).

==== New Orthographic Dictionary system ====
A modification of the system using a diacritic was proposed in the authoritative New Orthographic Dictionary of the Bulgarian Language in 2002, with ъ rendered as ă rather than a. However, that proposal was not adopted for official usage, and failed to become established in popular practice.

==== Streamlined System with -ia-exception ====
An exception to the rules was introduced by the Bulgarian authorities in 2006, mandating the transliteration of word-final -ия as -ia rather than -iya in given names and geographical names (such as Ilia, Maria and Bulgaria, Sofia, Trakia etc.). In 2009, a law passed by the Bulgarian parliament made this system mandatory for all official use and some types of private publications, expanding also the application of the ia-exception rule to all -ия in word-final position.

The Streamlined system was adopted by UN in 2012, and by BGN and PCGN in 2013.

According to Arenstein, "The international roots of the Bulgarian romanization system strike at the core of one of romanization's most perplexing paradoxes: an impulse to redefine and distinguish national identity while also ensuring the accessibility of that identity to outside groups. In other words, instilling nationalism with a sense of internationalism."

==== Streamlined System with unambiguous reverse mapping ====
A variant of the Streamlined System allowing for unambiguous mapping back into Cyrillic was proposed by Ivanov, Skordev and Dobrev in 2010 to be used in cases when the retrieval of the original Cyrillic forms is essential. For that purpose, certain Cyrillic letters and combinations of letters are transliterated as follows: ъ→`a, ь→`y, зх→z|h, йа→y|a, йу→y|u, сх→s|h, тс→t|s, тш→t|sh, тщ→t|sht, шт→sh|t, шц→sh|ts, ия (in final position, if the ia-exception rule is applied) →i|a. The standard transliteration form of a given text is obtained from its unambiguously reversible one by simply removing the additional symbols ` (grave accent) and | (vertical bar).

=== Other ===
Systems along similar lines to the new official Bulgarian system, though with differences regarding the letters х, ъ, ь, ю and я, have also been in use in the ALA-LC Romanization scheme of the Library of Congress, British Standard 2959:1958, the now-superseded 1952 BGN/PCGN romanization of the United States and British geographic naming institutions, and the 1917 system of the British Academy.

The ISO 9 standard, in its 1995 version, has introduced another romanization system that works with a consistent one-to-one reversible mapping, resorting to rare diacritic combinations such as ⟨â,û,ŝ⟩.

The GOST 7.79-2000 "Rules of transliteration of Cyrillic script by Latin alphabet" contains an unambiguous and reversible ASCII-compatible transliteration system for Bulgarian: й→j, х→x, ц→c or cz, ч→ch, ш→sh, щ→sth, ъ→a`, ь→`, ю→yu, я→ya.

== Archaic letters ==
The archaic Cyrillic letters ѣ and ѫ, which were part of the pre-1945 orthography of Bulgarian, are variously transcribed as ⟨i͡e, e⟩, as ⟨ya, ě⟩, and as ⟨u̐, ŭǎ⟩, respectively, in the ALA/LC, BGN/PCGN and ISO 9 standards.

== Comparison table ==
Cyrillic	ISO 9 (1995)	ISO 9 (1968)	Scientific	ALA/LC	British Standard (1958)	BGN/PCGN (1952)	Official Bulgarian (2006); UN (2012); BGN/PCGN (2013)	Danchev
а	a							
б	b							
в	v							
г	g							
д	d							
е	e							
ж	ž			zh				
з	z							
и	i							
й	j			ĭ		y		y, i
к	k							
л	l							
м	m							
н	n							
о	o							
п	p							
р	r							
с	s							
т	t							
тс					t-s	t∙s		
у	u							ou
ф	f							
х	h		x (ch)	kh			h	
ц	c			t͡s	ts			
ч	č			ch				
ш	š			sh				
щ	ŝ	šč	št	sht				
ъ	ʺ		ӑ	ŭ (ʺ)	ŭ		a	u
ь	ʹ			ʹ	ʼ, '	ʼ	y	
ю	û	ju		i͡u	yu			
я	â	ja		i͡a	ya			
Archaic letters
ѫ	ǎ	ȧ (ʺ)	ʺ	u̐	ū	ŭ		
ѣ	ě			i͡e	ê	e, ya		

== Romanization sample ==
Original text in Cyrillic	BGN/PCGN romanization	Scientific transliteration	IPA transcription	English translation
Всички хора се раждат свободни и равни по достойнство и права. Те са надарени с разум и съвест и следва да се отнасят помежду си в дух на братство.	Vsichki hora se razhdat svobodni i ravni po dostoynstvo i prava. Te sa nadareni s razum i savest i sledva da se otnasyat pomezhdu si v duh na bratstvo.	Vsički hora se raždat svobodni i ravni po dostojnstvo i prava. Te sa nadareni s razum i sǎvest i sledva da se otnasjat pomeždu si v duh na bratstvo.	[ˈfsitʃki ˈxɔrɐ sɛ ˈraʒdɐt svоˈbɔdni i ˈravni pɔ doˈstɔjnstvo i prɐˈva ‖ tɛ sɐ nɐdɐˈrɛni s‿ˈrazom i ˈsɤvɛst i ˈslɛdvɐ dɐ sɛ otˈnasʲɐt promɛʒˈdu si v‿dux nɐ ˈbratstvo ‖]	All human beings are born free and equal in dignity and rights. They are endowed with reason and conscience and should act towards one another in a spirit of brotherhood.

== Personalized and stylized writing ==
Some people and companies prefer to use or retain personalized spellings of their own names in Latin. Examples are the politicians Ivan Stancioff (instead of "Stanchov") and Simeon Djankov (instead of "Dyankov"), and the beer brand Kamenitza (instead of Kamenitsa). The freedom of using different Roman transliterations of personal names is guaranteed by Article 2(2) of the governmental 2010 Regulation for Issuing of Bulgarian Personal Documents.

== Informal writing ==
Sometimes, especially in e-mail or text messaging, the Cyrillic alphabet is not available and people are forced to write in Roman script. This often does not follow the official or any other of the standards listed above, but rather is an idiosyncratic Bulgarian form of text speak. While most letters are straightforward, several can take different forms. The letter variants listed below are often used interchangeably with some or all of the above standards, often in the same message.

Cyrillic letter	Latin variant	Examples	Notes
ж	j, zh, z, (rarely: w)	plaj (плаж, beach) kozha (кожа, skin) vezliv (вежлив, polite)	j – the sound of ж is represented by j in French, the English sound of j is also similar zh – official transliteration z – shortened version of zh or stripped version of ž
й	i, y, j	iod (йод, iodine) mayoneza (майонеза, mayonnaise); Jordan (Йордан, name Yordan)	j – more rarely used, but especially in words that are foreign to Bulgarian and with j in Latin script
ц	c	carevica (царевица, corn)	c almost exclusively represents ц despite the official transliteration of the Cyrillic letter being ts
ч	4, ch	4ovek (човек, human)	In Bulgarian the number 4 is chetiri (четири); additionally and perhaps more importantly the glyph ⟨4⟩ looks similar to ⟨ч⟩; this is also used in Volapuk encoding
ш	6, sh, (rarely: w)	be6e (беше, It was)	In Bulgarian the number 6 is shest (шест)
щ	6t, sht, (rarely: 7)	sno6ti (снощи, yesterday at night / yesternight)	6t – a combination 6+t to represent the sound of щ 7 – since in the Cyrillic alphabet щ follows ш, 7 can be used as it follows 6 (ш)
ъ	a, u, y, 1, (rarely: @, `)	sanuva (сънува, dreams); Bulgaria pyzel (пъзел, puzzle) v1n (вън, outside)	1 – the number may resemble the letter ъ.
ю	u, y, yu, ju, iu	zumbyul (зюмбюл, hyacinth)	As a single letter diphthong the letter ю has many variations
я	q, ya, ja, ia	konqk (коняк, cognac)	As a single letter diphthong the letter я has many variations but the most common is the single letter q as it resembles я.

There is no set rule, and people often vary the combinations within a single message, so that "ъ" may be presented as "u", "a" or "y" in three adjacent words, and "щ" can be "sht" in one word, and "6t" in the next, and "ю" may be written differently in the same word. Conversely, "j" could be used to represent "й", "ж" and even "дж" in adjacent words, while "y" can be used for "ъ" in one word and for "й" in the next.

This unofficial email/SMS language is often referred to as "shlyokavitsa" (шльокавица, 6lyokavica). The use of Latinized Bulgarian, while ubiquitous in personal communication, is frowned upon in certain internet contexts, and many websites' comment sections and internet forums have rules stating that posts in Roman script will be deleted.

== See also ==
- Belarusian alphabet
- Cyrillic alphabets
- Cyrillic script
- Faux Cyrillic
- Greek alphabet
- Macedonian alphabet
- Montenegrin alphabet
- Romanization of Belarusian
- Romanization of Greek
- Romanization of Macedonian
- Romanization of Russian
- Romanization of Ukrainian
- Russian alphabet
- Scientific transliteration of Cyrillic
- Serbian Cyrillic alphabet
- Ukrainian alphabet
