= Scientific transliteration of Cyrillic =

Cyrillic Romanization system

Scientific transliteration of Cyrillic is an international method for transliteration of text from the Cyrillic script to the Latin script (romanization). This system is most often seen in linguistics publications on Slavic languages.

Scientific transliteration, also called academic, linguistic, international, or scholarly transliteration, was first introduced in 1898 as part of the standardization process for the Preußische Instruktionen (PI; a library cataloging system used in German-speaking countries) in 1899.

== Details ==
The scientific transliteration system is roughly as phonemic as is the orthography of the language transliterated. The deviations are with щ where the transliteration makes clear that two phonemes are involved, and џ, where it fails to represent the (monophonemic) affricate with a single letter. The transliteration system is based on the Gaj's Latin alphabet used in Serbo-Croatian, in which each letter corresponds directly to a Cyrillic letter in Bosnian, Montenegrin and Serbian official standards, and was heavily based on the earlier Czech alphabet. The Cyrillic letter х, representing the sound [x] as in Bach, was romanized h in Serbo-Croatian, but in German-speaking countries the native digraph ch was used instead. It was codified in the 1898 Prussian Instructions for libraries, or Preußische Instruktionen (PI), which were adopted in Central Europe and Scandinavia. Scientific transliteration can also be used to romanize the early Glagolitic alphabet, which has a close correspondence to Cyrillic.

Scientific transliteration is often adapted to serve as a phonetic alphabet.

Scientific transliteration was the basis for the ISO 9 transliteration standard. While linguistic transliteration tries to preserve the original language's pronunciation to a certain degree, the latest version of the ISO standard (ISO 9:1995) has abandoned this concept, which was still found in ISO/R 9:1968 and is now restricted to a one-to-one mapping of letters. It thus allows for unambiguous reverse transliteration into the original Cyrillic text and is language-independent.

The previous official Soviet romanization system, GOST 16876-71, is also based on scientific transliteration but used Latin h for Cyrillic х instead of Latin x or ssh and sth for Cyrillic Щ, and had a number of other differences. Most countries using Cyrillic script now have adopted GOST 7.79 instead, which is not the same as ISO 9 but close to it.

Representing all of the necessary diacritics on computers requires Unicode, Latin-2, Latin-4, or Latin-7 encoding.

== Table ==
Prussian Instructions, scientific transliteration, and ISO 9
Cyrillic	Scientific transliteration								PI	ISO 9
Cyrillic	Church Slavonic	Bulgarian	Russian	Belarusian	Ukrainian	Carpathian Rusyn	Serbian	Macedonian	PI	ISO 9
А а	a	a	a	a	a	a	a	a	a	a
Б б	b	b	b	b	b	b	b	b	b	b
В в	v	v	v	v	v	v	v	v	v	v
Г г	g	g	g	h	h	h	g	g	g	g
Ґ ґ				g (Note: archaic letter)	g	g				g̀
Д д	d	d	d	d	d	d	d	d	d	d
Ѓ ѓ								ǵ (ģ)		ǵ
Ђ ђ							đ (dj)		ď	đ
Е е		e	e	e	e	e	e	e	e	e
Ё ё			ë	ë		ë (jo)			ë	ë
Є є	e				je	je				ê
Ж ж	ž	ž	ž	ž	ž	ž	ž	ž	ž	ž
З з	z	z	z	z	z	z	z	z	z	z
Ѕ ѕ	ʒ (dz)							dz		ẑ
И и	i	i	i		y	y (î)	i	i	i	i
I і	i		i	i	i	i			i	ì
Ї ї	i				ji (ï)	ji (ï)				ï
Й й		j	j	j	j	j			j	j
Ј ј							j	j	j	ǰ
К к	k	k	k	k	k	k	k	k	k	k
Л л	l	l	l	l	l	l	l	l	l	l
Љ љ							lj (ļ/ľ)	lj (ļ/ľ)	ľ	ľ
М м	m	m	m	m	m	m	m	m	m	m
Н н	n	n	n	n	n	n	n	n	n	n
Њ њ							nj (ň/ń/ņ)	nj (ň/ń/ņ)	n’ (ń)	ň
О о	o	o	o	o	o	o	o	o	o	o
П п	p	p	p	p	p	p	p	p	p	p
Р р	r	r	r	r	r	r	r	r	r	r
С с	s	s	s	s	s	s	s	s	s	s
Т т	t	t	t	t	t	t	t	t	t	t
Ќ ќ								ḱ (ķ)		ḱ
Ћ ћ	ǵ						ć		ć	ć
У у		u	u	u	u	u	u	u	u	u
ОУ оу	u								u	
Ў ў				ŭ (w)						ŭ
Ф ф	f	f	f	f	f	f	f	f	f	f
Х х	x (ch)	x (ch)	x (ch)	x (ch)	x (ch)	x (ch)	h	h (x)	ch	h
Ц ц	c	c	c	c	c	c	c	c	c	c
Ч ч	č	č	č	č	č	č	č	č	č	č
Џ џ							dž (ģ)	dž	ǵ	d̂
Ш ш	š	š	š	š	š	š	š	š	š	š
Щ щ	ŝ, št	št	šč		šč	šč			šč (št BG OCS)	ŝ
Ъ ъ	ъ (ŭ)	ă	ʺ			ʺ			ʺ (Note: Disregarded if final.), ŭ (BG)	ʺ
Ы ы	y		y	y	y	ŷ (y)			y	y
Ь ь	ь (ĭ)	ʹ	ʹ	ʹ	ʹ	ʹ			ʹ	ʹ
Ѣ ѣ	ě	ě	ě	ě	ě	ě			ě	ě
Э э			ė (è)	ė (è)					ė	è
Ю ю	ju	ju	ju	ju	ju	ju			ju	û
Я я		ja	ja	ja	ja	ja			ja	â
ʼ					ʼ	ʼ		ʼ		ʼ
Ѡ ѡ	ō (o, ô)								(o)	
Ѧ ѧ	ę								ę	
Ѩ ѩ	ję								ję	
Ѫ ѫ	ǫ	ȧ (ă)							ă (BG), ą (OCS)	ǎ
Ѭ ѭ	jǫ	jă							ją	
Ѯ ѯ	ẋ (ks)								(ks)	
Ѱ ѱ	ṗs (ps)								(ps)	
Ѳ ѳ	ḟ (th, θ)		f	f	f				ḟ (f˙)	f̀
Ѵ ѵ	ẏ (ÿ)		(i)	(i)	(i)				ẏ	ỳ
Ѥ ѥ	je								je	
Ꙗ ꙗ	ja								(ja)	

( ) Letters in parentheses are older or alternative transliterations. Ukrainian and Belarusian apostrophe are not transcribed. The early Cyrillic letter koppa (Ҁ, ҁ) was used only for transliterating Greek and its numeric value and was thus omitted. Prussian Instructions and ISO 9:1995 are provided for comparison.

Unicode encoding is:

- U+02BC ʼ MODIFIER LETTER APOSTROPHE for the Cyrillic apostrophe
- U+02B9 ʹ MODIFIER LETTER PRIME to transliterate the soft sign
- U+02BA ʺ MODIFIER LETTER DOUBLE PRIME to transliterate the hard sign

== See also ==
- Romanization of Belarusian
- Romanization of Bulgarian
- Romanization of Greek
- Romanization of Macedonian
- Romanization of Russian
- Romanization of Serbian
- Romanization of Ukrainian
- ALA-LC romanization for Russian
- GOST 7.79-2000
