= Fritz Wolff =

German scholar in Iranian Studies (1880–1943)

- Born: 11 November 1880; Berlin, Germany
- Died: 12 March 1943 (aged 62); Auschwitz-Birkenau, occupied Poland

Academic work
- Main interests: Shanameh

Fritz Wolff (11 November 1880 – 1943) was a German Iranologist. He is particularly known for his translation of the Avesta and his glossary of Ferdowsi's Shahnameh. He was murdered during the Holocaust in the Auschwitz-Birkenau extermination camp.

== Upbringing and education ==
Fritz Wolff was born on 11 November 1880 as the son of the merchant Emanuel Wolff (1850–1901) and his wife Hedwig Wolff (1860–1935). They originally came from near Posen and moved to Berlin. The family was relatively affluent, which allowed Wolff the opportunity to pursue a career as an independent scholar (Privatgelehrter). After graduating from the French Gymnasium in Berlin in 1899, he studied comparative linguistics with a focus on Indo-Iranian languages in Munich, Heidelberg, Berlin, and Giessen under Otto Behaghel, Hermann Osthoff, and Karl Groos. In 1905, he received his doctorate at the University of Giessen under Christian Bartholomae, who would heavily influence his academic path.

== Scholarly work ==
For various reasons, Wolff did not pursue a traditional academic career; he likely feared discrimination due to his Jewish heritage and preferred to conduct his research in seclusion. After completing his studies, he continued to live in university towns such as Münster, Berlin, Tübingen, and Giessen, utilizing their libraries for his research. He also spent two years living in Italy.

His dissertation, Die Infinitive des Indischen und Iranischen, was published in 1907 in the journal Zeitschrift für vergleichende Sprachforschung. In 1910, he published Avesta. Die heiligen Bücher der Parsen. Übersetzt auf der Grundlage von Christian Bartholomaes Altiranischem Wörterbuch, the first critical translation of the Avesta. This book was based on two important earlier works: Geldner's edition of the Avesta, and Bartholomae's Altiranisches Wörterbuch; both having been described as the seminal achievement of the field. Due to this solid text-critical and etymological foundation, Wolff's translation is seen as an important achievement.

In 1934, the Glossar zu Firdosis Schahname was published on the occasion of the millenary celebration of Ferdowsi. This work is often seen as his most important achievement. This glossary of the Shanameh has been described as "an almost exhaustive index, lexicon, and concordance to three standard editions of the national epic, namely, those of Mohl (Paris), Vullers (Leiden), and Turner Macan (Calcutta)."

== Personal life ==
In Giessen, he met his first wife Minna Pfeffer (1884–1943; murdered in Auschwitz), with whom he had two sons and a daughter, the photographer Ursula Wolff-Schneider (1906–1977; married to the architect Karl Schneider). The family lived initially in Berlin, from 1918 in Giessen, and from 1933 back in Berlin. Following their divorce in 1936, Wolff married Margarete Marckwald (1900–1943; murdered in Auschwitz) that same year, with whom he lived in Berlin-Neukölln.

== Nazi persecution and murder during the Holocaust ==
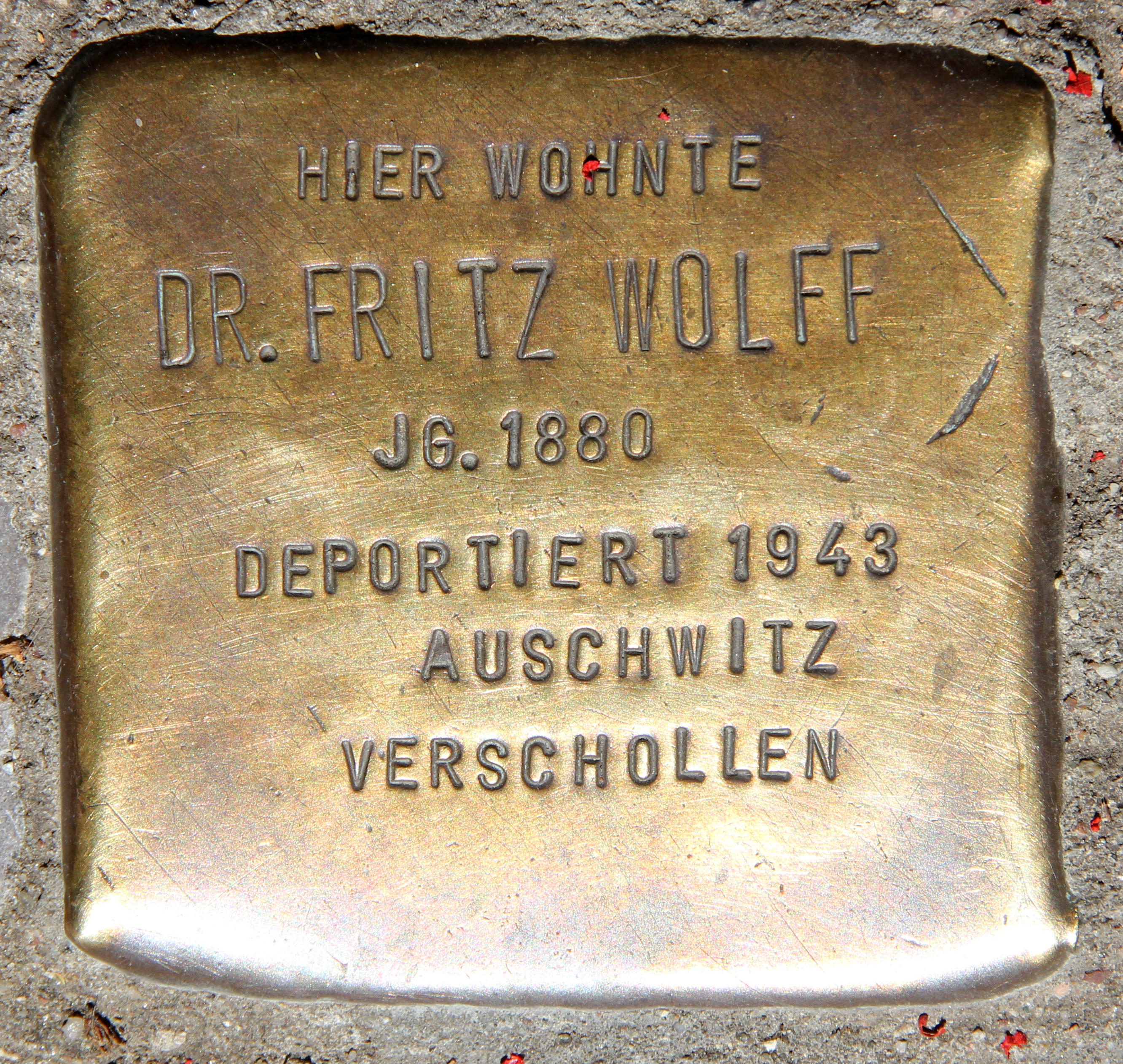
Stolperstein for Fritz Wolff in Jonasstraße 4 in Neukölln

After the Machtergreifung by the Nazis in 1933, Antisemitism rose sharply in Germany. Although he had converted to Lutheranism, this effected him regardless. He had, e.g., immediately difficulties to publish his Glossar zu Firdosis Schahname, which was finished by that time. Through the intervention of fellow Iranologist Hans Heinrich Schaeder, it could still be presented to the Reza Shah Pahlavi of Persia during the millenary celebration of Ferdowsi in 1934. The same year, during the annual meeting of the Deutsche Morgenländische Gesellschaft, was also the last time before his death that his contribution to German Iranology was acknowledged.

Wolff remained in Berlin until spring 1943. At this time, deportations of the remaining Jews of Berlin had resumed. They were carried out at night to avoid protests by local workers. According to his friend Richard Tüngel, he refused to be hidden, when they were warned by a neighbor of the impending deportation. Instead, he stayed with his wife and his Lutheran pastor until the Nazis came. He and his wife were then deported to the Auschwitz-Birkenau extermination camp and most likely murdered shortly thereafter.

Wolff's children emigrated to the United States and thus survived the National Socialist era. In 1950, Hans Heinrich Schaeder published an obituary for Wolff in the Zeitschrift der Deutschen Morgenländischen Gesellschaft. In 2003, a Stolperstein (stumbling stone) in front of Fritz Wolff's former residence in Berlin Neukölln was installed to commemorate his murder.

== Selected publications ==
- Wolff, Fritz (1907). "Die infinitive des Indischen und Iranischen. Erster Teil". Zeitschrift für vergleichende Sprachforschung auf dem Gebiete der Indogermanischen Sprachen. 40 (1): 1–111. JSTOR 40846301.
- Wolff, Fritz (1910). Avesta. Die heiligen Bücher der Parsen. Übersetzt auf der Grundlage von Christian Bartholomaes Altiranischem Wörterbuch. Straßburg: K. J. Trübner.
- Wolff, Fritz (1934). Glossar zu Firdosis Schahname. Berlin: Notgemeinschaft der Deutschen Wissenschaft in Verbindung mit der Deutschen Morgenländischen Gesellschaft.
