= Mojtaba Minovi =

Iranian academic

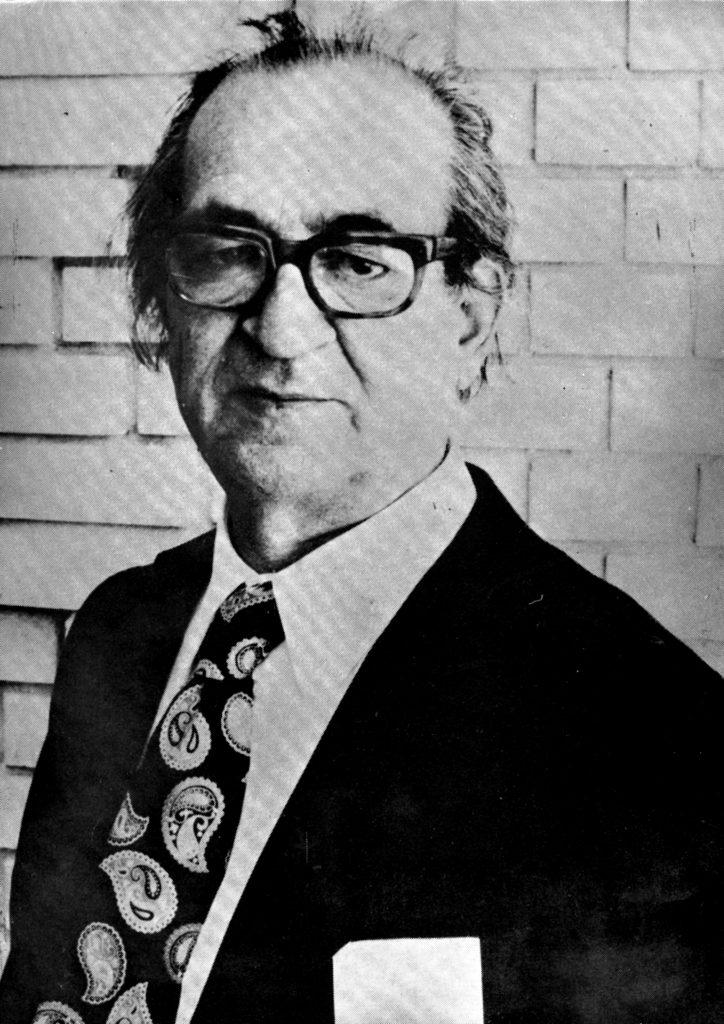
Portrait of Mojtaba Minovi

Mojtaba Minovi (Persian: مجتبی مینوی; February 1903 Tehran – January 1977, Tehran), was an Iranian historian, literary scholar and professor of Tehran University. He was a participant in the Ferdowsi Millenary celebrations in 1934 in Tehran.
