= Azada Rustamova =

Azerbaijani orientalist and literary theorist

Azada Jafar gizi Rustamova
- Born: July 18, 1932; Baku, Azerbaijan SSR
- Died: April 19, 2005 (aged 65); Baku, Azerbaijan
- Education: Azerbaijan State University; Institute of Oriental Studies of the Russian Academy of Sciences
- Awards: Order of the Badge of Honour; Honored Scientist of Azerbaijan
- Scientific career
- Fields: Oriental studies
- Workplaces: Institute of Literature of the Azerbaijan National Academy of Sciences
- Doctoral advisor: Evgenii Eduardovich Bertels

Azade Jafar gizi Rustamova (Azerbaijani: Azadə Cəfər qızı Rüstəmova, 18 July 1932–19 April 2005) was an Azerbaijani orientalist and literary theorist, Honored Scientist of Azerbaijan, correspond member of the Azerbaijan National Academy of Sciences (2001). She was the author of about 300 articles, as well as 20 books and monographs.

== Life ==
Azade Rustamova was born on 18 July 1932 in Baku, Azerbaijan. After graduating from secondary school No. 132 in Baku, she entered to the Faculty of Oriental Studies of Azerbaijan State University. Rustamova graduated from the university with honors in 1951 and continued her education at the Institute of Oriental Studies of the Academy of Sciences of the USSR (1953–1956). In 1956, she defended her dissertation on Fuzuli's poem "Layla and Majnun" under the scientific supervision of Evgenii Bertels, a correspond member of the Academy of Sciences of the Soviet Union.

After returning to Azerbaijan, Azade Rustamova worked as a junior researcher and senior researcher at the Institute of Literature of the Azerbaijan National Academy of Sciences. In 1971, she defended her doctoral dissertation. She worked as the head of the Organizational Studies Department of the Institute of Literature in 1986–1991. She received the title of professor in 1990 and has been a senior researcher in the Medieval Department since 1991.

Rustamova, awarded the title of Honored Scientist (1982) and the Order of the Badge of Honour (1971).

In 1994, Azada Rustamova spoke at an international symposium dedicated to the 500th anniversary of Fuzuli held by UNESCO in Ankara.

Azade Rustamova died on April 19, 2005, in Baku.

=== Creativity ===
The main direction of her activity comprised the research and analysis of historical and theoretical issues in medieval literature. The historical-theoretical analysis of medieval Azerbaijani poetry, exploration of genres, examination of method and stylistic characteristics in the literature of that era, investigation into folklore relations, scrutiny of the problems related to inheritance, and the embodiment of humanistic ideas by Azerbaijani classical artists along with the exploration of religious and Sufi-pantheistic thought in poetry, are among the various issues that have found scholarly resolution in the scientist's research.

She is the author of more than 15 books and approximately 300 articles. She also wrote the "Ancient and Medieval Azerbaijani Literature" section of the 30-volume "Encyclopedia of Turkish Peoples' Literature" published in Turkey.
