= Ferdowsi millennial celebration in Berlin =

1934 celebration of Persian poet

The thousand-year celebration of Ferdowsi's birthday was held in Berlin on 27 September 1934 under the administration of the German Ministry of Science, Education and Culture (Reichserziehungsministerium), on the occasion of millenary celebration of Ferdowsi, announced by the government of Iran at the beginning of that year. The Berlin ceremony was held in the German Archaeological Institute. The Zeitschrift der Deutschen Morgenländischen Gesellschaft published a report of these ceremonies in its 1934 edition.

== Speeches ==
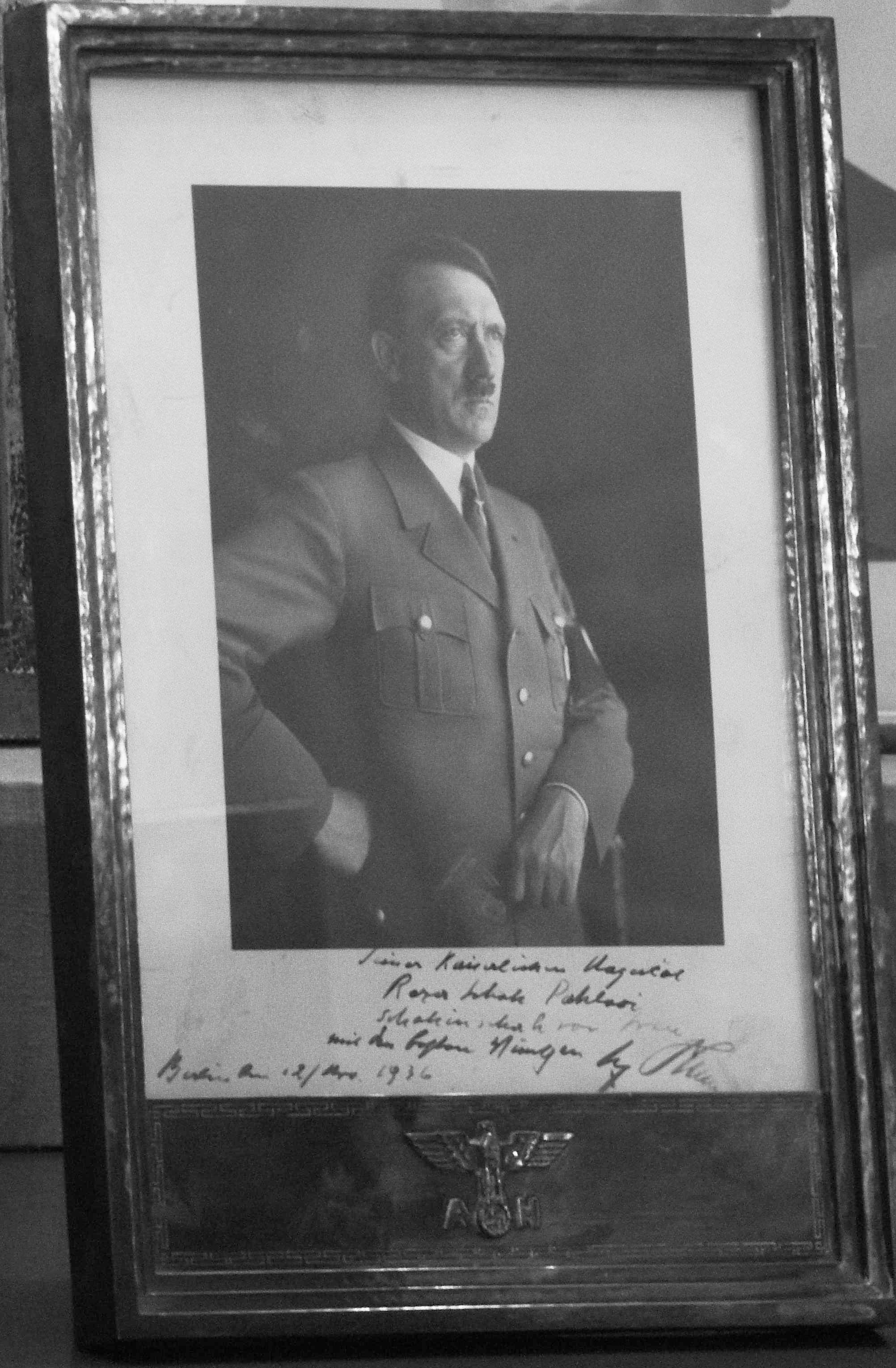
Adolf Hitler (pictured) to Reza Shah Pahlavi. Text: "His Imperial Majesty – Reza Shah Pahlavi – Shahanshah of Iran – with Best Wishes – Berlin 12 March 1936" – signed, Adolf Hitler

Dr. Wiegand, the head of the German Archaeological Institute, was the first lecturer. He praised the great Persian epics and the ancient Iranian culture and how Ferdowsi summoned all these ancient stories in his masterpiece, Shahnameh. Then Ministerialdirektor Prof. Dr. Theodor Vahlen as the Deputy of Reichserziehungsminister Dr. Bernhard Rust, made a speech. He said that the German Reich is very happy to have the opportunity to show its friendship towards the Imperial Iranian government through holding these ceremonies in honor of Ferdowsi and to show how well the German Reich respects the Iranian culture. He said that, we know the National Socialism is misunderstood by many people, but I want to reaffirm once again that the National Socialist government of Germany has no hostility with the foreign cultures and we deeply respect other cultures as long as they respect our German culture. All children of the oriental countries are welcome in Germany to study in our universities and to learn about German culture. We want them to feel at home while they are studying in our country. He also said that the German and Persian folks have a same root and both are Indo-Germanic people. In the end, he praised and hailed Reza Shah Pahlavi for his efforts toward modernization of Iran.

== Ferdowsi and the Germans ==
Dr. Schaeder in his speech praised Ferdowsi for his tremendous work to revive the Persian language against all odds and the pressure of foreign cultures. He also compared the history of Germany to the struggle of heroes in Shahnameh and concluded that these two are very similar. He called the year 1819 a pivotal juncture in the course of Germans' familiarity with the oriental culture. Along with the publication of new Deutsch translations of Hafiz and Rumi, the renowned German writer Joseph Görres completed his translation of the Shahnameh in this year which received great welcome with the German readers. He said the Shahnameh had a great impact on the German orientalists and inspired many scholars to conduct exploratory researches about Ferdowsi. The other credible translation of The Shahnameh belonged to the German poet and historian of literature, Adolf Friedrich von Schack whose version was published in 1851. Friedrich Rückert's translation was also published after his death in 1866.
