= Ferdowsi millennial celebration =

1934 series of commemorations of Persian poet

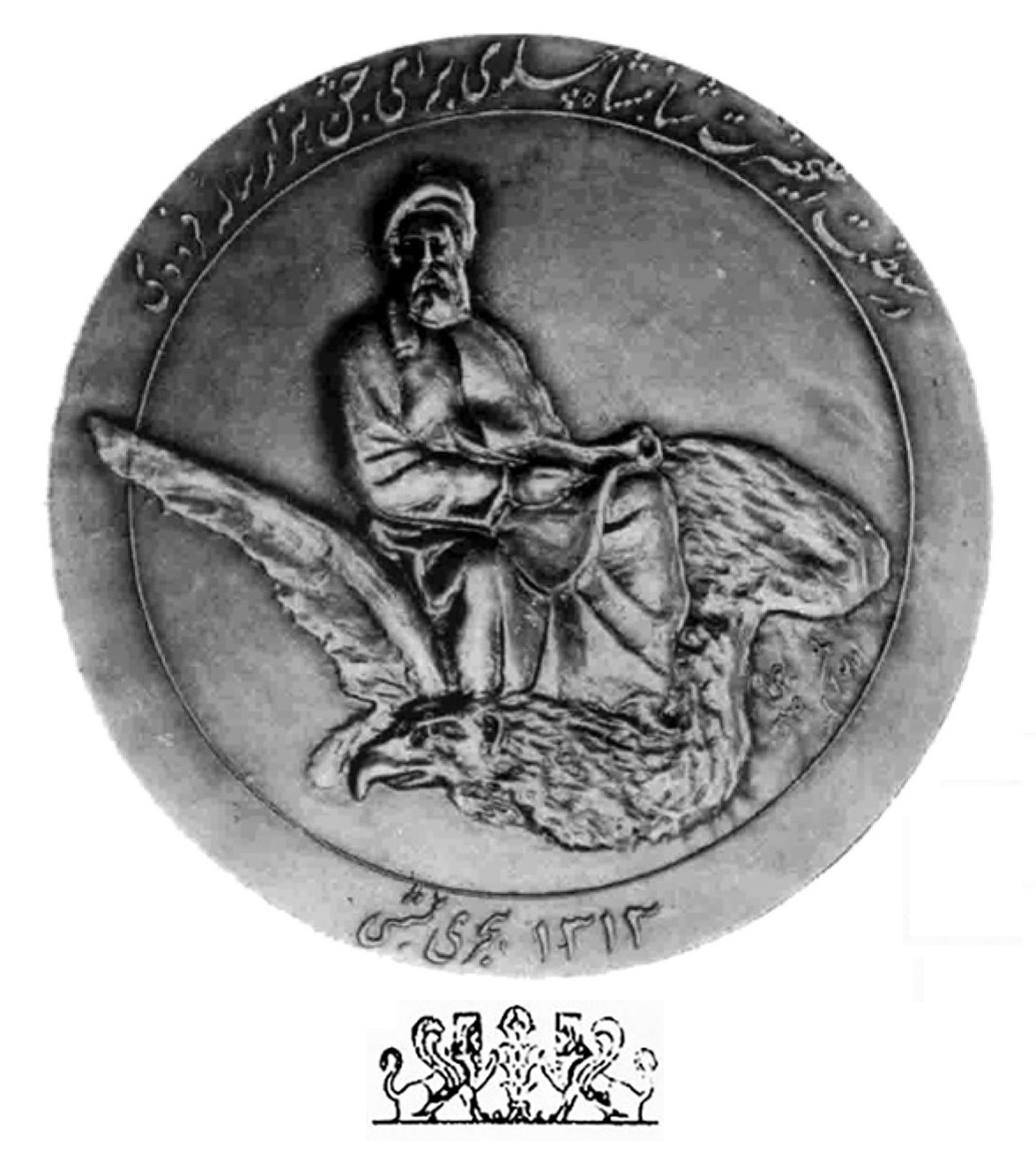
Ferdowsi millennial celebration commemorative medal.

The Ferdowsi millennial celebration (Persian: جشن هزاره فردوسی) was a series of celebrations and scholarly events in the year 1934 to commemorate the thousandth anniversary of Ferdowsi's birth. The Ferdowsi millennial was held at the initiative of Reza Shah Pahlavi and was announced at the beginning of the year by the government of Iran. The Millennial Congress convened for five days, from 2 to 6 October 1934, in Tehran, and more than eighty notable European and Iranian scholars attended the congress. The celebrations lasted for nearly a month.

Various official ceremonies were held simultaneously in a number of European countries including France, Britain, Germany, and the Soviet Union, in universities, clubs, and embassies. Also, a number of other countries, including the United States, Egypt and Iraq, held festivities.

== Participants in the Millennial Congress ==
The gathering in Tehran and Mashhad of about a hundred distinguished scholars as well as many dignitaries of various nationalities was a most beneficial event for Iranian studies in general and for research on Ferdowsi and the Shahnameh in particular.

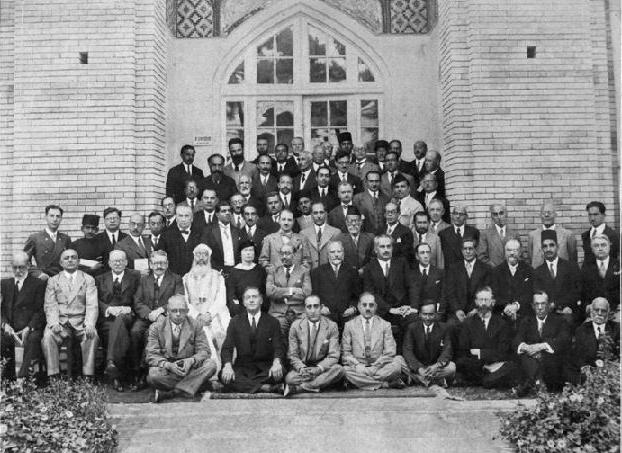
Participants in the Ferdowsi Millennial Congress, at the entrance to the Dar ul-Funun auditorium, Tehran

Distinguished participants included: Henri Massé (France), Vladimir Minorsky (England), Sebastian Beck (Germany), Evgenii Eduardovich Bertels (Soviet Union), Georges Contenau (France), Arthur Christensen (Denmark), Friedrich Sarre (Germany), Denison Ross (England), A. A. Bolotnikof (Soviet Union), Jan Rypka (Czechoslovakia), Franklin Gunther (United States), Alexsandr Freiman (Soviet Union), Yuri N. Marr (Soviet Union), Aleksandr A. Romaskevich (Soviet Union), Iosef Orbeli (Soviet Union), Jamshedji Unvala (India), Bahramgor Anklesaria (India), Antonio Pagliaro (Italy), Ernst Kühnel (Germany), L. A. Mayer (Israel), John Drinkwater (England), Syed Abdul Kareem Hussaini (Hyderabad–Deccan, India).

The Persian delegation, with forty members, was led by Mohammad-Ali Foroughi (who delivered the inaugural speech) and included, among others: Mohammad-Taqi Bahar, Ali-Asghar Hekmat, Ahmad Bahmanyar, Abbas Eqbal Ashtiani, Badiozzaman Forouzanfar, Ahmad Kasravi, Mojtaba Minovi, Said Nafisi, Hassan Pirnia, and Ebrahim Pourdavoud.

The final event of the celebrations was the inauguration of the new building for the mausoleum of Ferdowsi in Toos, by the congress participants, with the presence of Reza Shah Pahlavi.

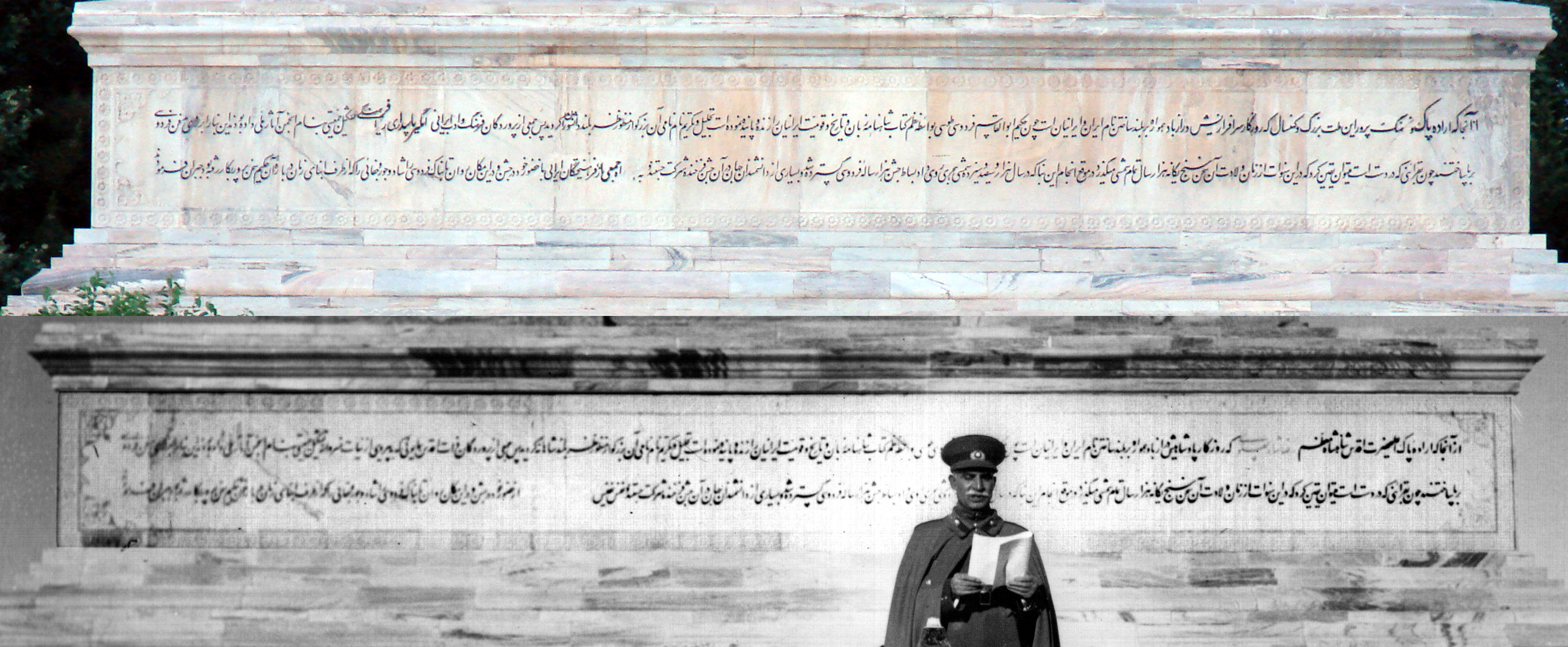
Pahlavi (I) officially opening the mausoleum of Ferdowsi for public visiting upon conclusion of Ferdowsi millenary conference.

== Scholarly publications related to the millennial ==
An important outcome of the Ferdowsi millennial was the publication of a large number of scholarly works dedicated to the study of Ferdowsi and the Shahnameh, notably:

- Mohammad Ramazani published the Shahnameh (based on Macan's edition) a year before the millennial (Tehran, in five volumes).
- Sayf Azad edited and published the Shahnameh and illustrated it with pictures of ancient kings inspired by Achaemenid and Sasanian sculptures (4 vols., Berlin, 1934–1935).
- Henri Massé's Firdausi et l'épopée nationale (Paris, 1934)
- Mohammad-Taqi Bahar's collected articles on Ferdowsi's life and works and the chronology of the Shahnameh, in a special issue of Bāḵtar monthly (Isfahan, 1934)
- A collection of papers presented by various Persian scholars to the congress in Ferdowsī-nāma-ye Mehr (Tehran, 1934)
- A collection by Armenian scholars in Yerevan under the title Firdusi Žolovacus (Ferdowsī celebration)
- A collection by Soviet scholars titled Ferdovsi (Moscow, 1934)
- Firdausi Celebration (New York, 1934), a collection of articles that included a catalog of the principal manuscripts of the Shahnameh then known.
- In 1935, Bertels wrote a small popular monograph on Ferdowsi (Abu-l-Kasim Ferdovsi i Ego Tvorchestovo; "Firdowsi and His Poetry"), translated into Persian by S. Izadi.
- The 1935 volume of the French periodical Journal Asiatique, devoted to Ferdowsi
- A special commemorative issue of Īrān-e Bāstān (Berlin, 1936) by Sayf Āzād.
- A collection of 33 papers read by the participants in the congress, under the title Ketāb-e hazāra-ye Ferdowsī (Tehran, 1943)

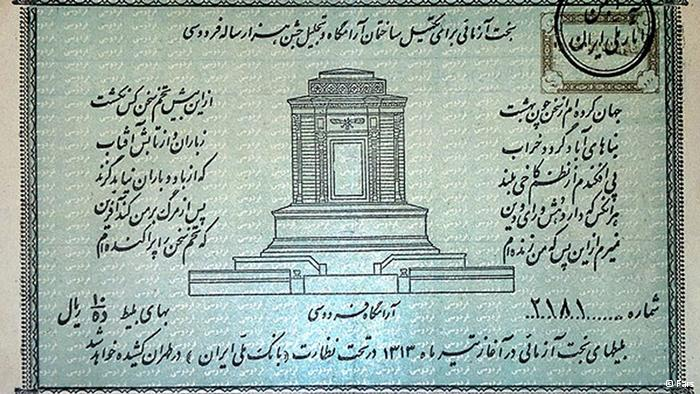
One of the first tickets sold for the celebration clearly shows the layering structure of the tomb

== Impact of the Ferdowsi millennial on Iranian Studies ==
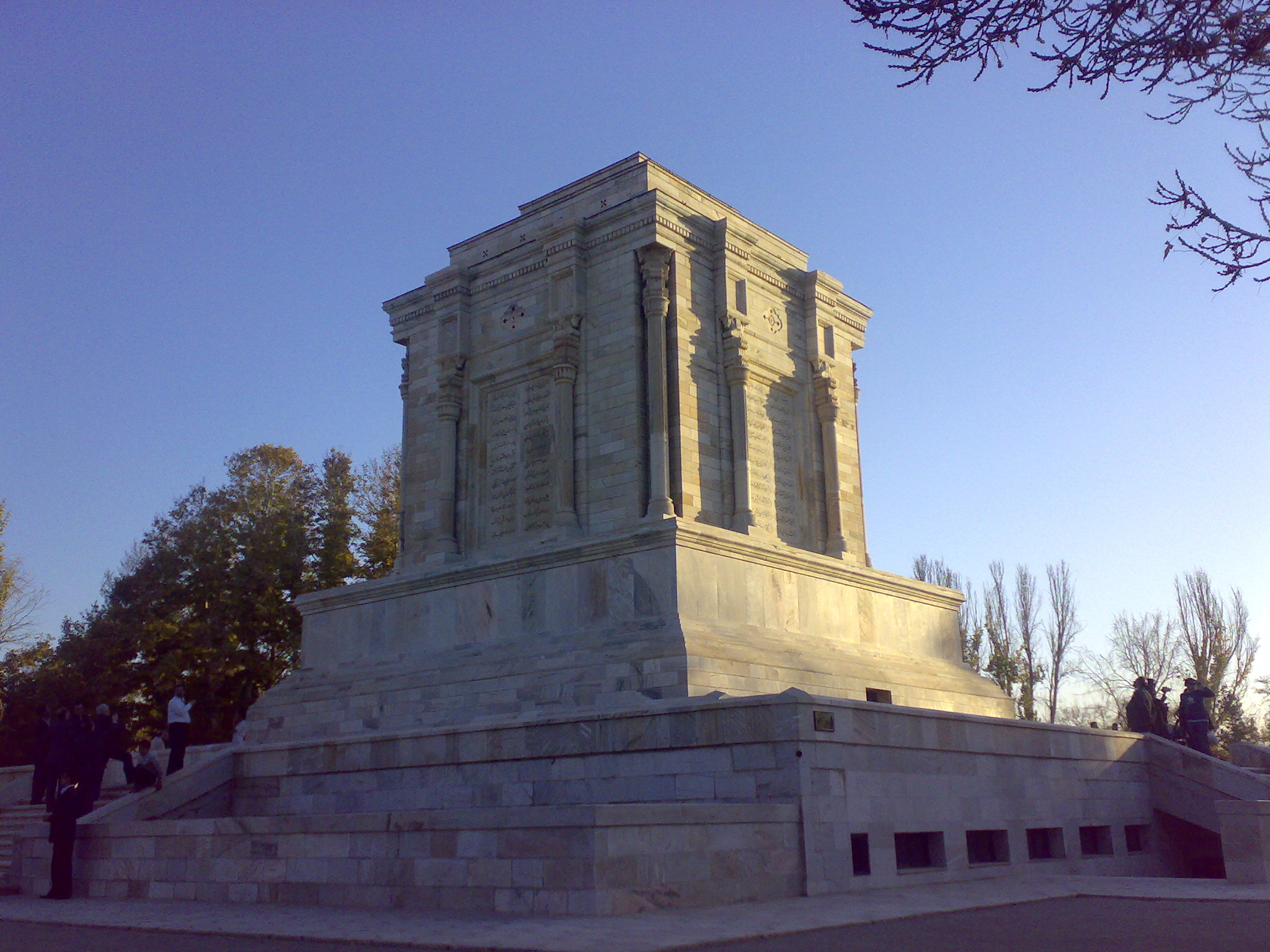
Mausoleum of Ferdowsi in Toos

Several participants of the congress expressed the opinion that the greatest service that the scholarly world could render to the Persian-speaking people would be the publication of a critical and reliable edition of the Shahnameh. The Borūḵīm Publishing House in Tehran tried to address this issue and published the complete text of the Šāh-nāma, based on the Vullers edition under the supervision of Mojtaba Minovi, Abbas Eqbal Ashtiani, Solayman Haïm and Said Nafisi. However, it was Bertels who started the preparation of a critical edition of Shahnameh, he edited two volumes, both published after his death in 1960 and 1962, the whole nine-volume edition was completed in 1971 under the editorship of Abdolhossein Noushin, and became the standard edition of Shahnameh, prior to Djalal Khaleghi-Motlagh edition (1990–2008).

Fritz Wolff made a lasting contribution with the publication of his glossary of Ferdowsi's Shahnameh (Glossar zu Ferdosis Schahname), which was presented as a gift to the Persian people by the German ambassador on the first day of the congress.

These contributions greatly advanced Iranian scholarship, and led to the appearance of a number of monumental scholarly works on Ferdowsi and the Shahnameh in subsequent decades.

== See also ==
- Ferdowsi millenary celebration in Berlin

== Sources ==
- Davis, Dick (1995). "Review: The Shahnameh by Abul-Qasem Ferdowsi, Djalal Khaleghi-Motlagh". International Journal of Middle East Studies. XXVII (3): 393–395. doi:10.1017/S0020743800062413. JSTOR 176284. S2CID 162740442.
- Izadi, Sirus (1990). Ferdowsi va Surudehayash (فردوسی و سروده هایش) (in Persian). Tehran: Entesharate Hirmand.
- Ketāb-e hazāra-ye Ferdowsī (in Persian), Tehran 1943
- Shahbazi, A.S. (26 January 2012). Ehsan Yarshater (ed.). "Ferdowsi, Abu'l-Qāsem IV. Millenary Celebration". Encyclopædia Iranica. Encyclopædia Iranica Foundation.
- Shahbazi, A.S. (1991). "Review: Abu'l-Qasem Ferdowsi, the Shahnameh (Book of Kings), vol. I. by Djalal Khaleghi-Motlagh". Journal of the American Oriental Society. CXI (1): 154–155. doi:10.2307/603776. JSTOR 603776.
