= GOST 16876-71 =

Soviet standard for romanization of Cyrillic

GOST 16876-71 (Russian: ГОСТ 16876-71) is a romanization system (for transliteration of Russian Cyrillic alphabet texts into the Latin alphabet) devised by the National Administration for Geodesy and Cartography of the Soviet Union. It is based on the scientific transliteration system used in linguistics. GOST was an international standard so it included provision for a number of the languages of the Soviet Union. The standard was revised twice in 1973 and 1980 with minor changes.

GOST 16876-71 contains two tables of a transliteration:

- Table 1: one Cyrillic char to one Latin char, some with diacritics
- Table 2: one Cyrillic char to one or many Latin char, but without diacritics

In 1978, COMECON adopted GOST 16876-71 with minor modifications as its official transliteration standard, under the name of SEV 1362-78 (Russian: СЭВ 1362-78).

GOST 16876-71 was used by the United Nations to develop its romanization system for geographical names, which was adopted for official use by the United Nations at the Fifth United Nations Conference on the Standardization of Geographical Names in Montreal, Quebec, Canada, in 1987. UN system relies on diacritics to compensate for non-Russian Cyrillic alphabets.

In 2002, the Russian Federation along with a number of CIS countries abandoned the use of GOST 16876 in favor of ISO 9:1995, which was adopted as GOST 7.79-2000.

== Russian ==
GOST and GOST-Based Transliteration for Russian
Cyrillic	GOST 16876-71 table 1	GOST 16876-71 table 2	GOST 7.79-2000, system A; ISO (1995)	GOST 7.79-2000, system B	UN 1987
А а	a				
Б б	b				
В в	v				
Г г	g				
Д д	d				
Е е	e	e (je)*	e	e	e
Ё ё	ë	jo	ë	yo	ë
Ж ж	ž	zh	ž	zh	ž
З з	z				
И и	i				
Й й	j	jj	j	j	j
К к	k				
Л л	l				
М м	m				
Н н	n				
О о	o				
П п	p				
Р р	r				
С с	s				
Т т	t				
У у	u				
Ф ф	f				
Х х	h (ch)*	kh	h	kh	h
Ц ц	c	c	c	cz, c†	c
Ч ч	č	ch	č	ch	č
Ш ш	š	sh	š	sh	š
Щ щ	ŝ (šč)*	shh	ŝ	shh	šč
Ъ ъ	ʺ	ʺ	ʺ	ʺ	ʺ
Ы ы	y	y	y	y'	y
Ь ь	ʹ	ʹ	ʹ	ʹ	ʹ
Э э	è	eh	è	e'	è
Ю ю	û (ju)*	ju	û	yu	ju
Я я	â (ja)*	ja	â	ya	ja

Obsolete letters
Cyrillic	GOST 16876-71 table 1	GOST 16876-71 table 2	GOST 7.79-2000, system A; ISO (1995)	GOST 7.79-2000, system B; ISO (1995)	UN 1987
Pre-1918 letters
І і	ì	ih	ì	i, i'‡	ĭ
Ѳ ѳ	-	-	f̀	fh	ḟ
Ѣ ѣ	-	-	ě	ye	ě
Ѵ ѵ	-	-	ỳ	yh	ẏ

Notes
* In parentheses the acceptable additional variants are shown.
† It is recommended to use c before i, e, y, and j, and cz in all other cases.
‡ Cyrillic і in Ukrainian and Belarusian is always transliterated as Latin i, as well as in Old Russian and Old Bulgarian texts where it is usually used before vowels. In the rare case where it falls before a consonant (for example, in the word міръ) it is transliterated with an apostrophe i'.

The letters і, ѳ, ѣ, ѵ are found in texts from before the Russian orthographic reform of 1918.

== Ukrainian ==
During 1995—2009 the Ukrainian Derzhstandart tried to introduce the new system of transliteration instead of the Soviet one, though none of the draft projects were accepted officially.

GOST for Ukrainian letters
Cyrillic	г	ґ	є	и	і	ї	й	х	ʼ
GOST 16876-71 table 1	g	–	ê, je	i	ì	ì	j	h, ch	*
GOST 16876-71 table 2	g	–	je	i	ih	ji	jj	kh	ʺ
Derzhstandart (project 2008)	h	g	ê, je*	y	i	ï, ji*	j	x	ʼ

Note: * System B (without diacritics)

== See also ==
- Romanization of Russian
- Romanization of Ukrainian
- GOST standards
