= Bartholomae's law =

Proto-Indo-European sound law

Bartholomae's law, sometimes referred to as the Buddha rule, is a Proto-Indo-European sound law affecting consonant clusters, most clearly in the Indo-Iranian languages. It states that in a cluster of two or more obstruents (stops or the sibilant *s), any one of which is a voiced aspirated stop anywhere in the sequence, the whole cluster becomes voiced and aspirated. Thus, to the Proto-Indo-European root *bʰewdʰ- 'learn, become aware of', the participle *bʰudʰ-to- 'enlightened' loses the aspiration of the first stop (following Grassmann's law) and with the application of Bartholomae's law and regular vowel changes gives Sanskrit buddha 'enlightened'. The law is named after German linguist Christian Bartholomae, who first described it in 1883.

== Further developments ==
In both the Indic and the Iranian subgroups, further developments partially obscured the operation of the law; thanks to the falling together of plain voiced and voiced aspirated stops in Iranian, Bartholomae's law appears synchronically as progressive voicing assimilation after roots that originally ended in voiced aspirates, for example Old Avestan aogda 'he said' from Proto-Indo-European *Hewgʰ-to. This is not true for roots with plain voiced stops, for example Old Avestan yuxta 'yoked' from Proto-Indo-European *yug-to-, where Bartholomae's law does not apply.

In Indic, voiced *z as resulting from Bartholomae's law was devoiced to s, although there is some evidence from the Rigvedic language that a voiced aspirate *z once existed in Indic as well. This is shown by forms like gdha 'he swallowed' and dudukṣa- 'want to give milk' (see below).

== Interpretation ==
A written form such as -ddh- (a literal rendition of the devanāgarī representation) presents problems of interpretation. The choice is between a long voiced stop with a specific release feature, aspiration, symbolized in transliteration by -h-, or else a long stop (or stop cluster) with a different phonational state, "murmur", whereby the breathy release is an artifact of the phonational state. The latter interpretation is rather favored by such phenomena as the Rigvedic form gdha 'he swallowed', which is morphologically a middle aorist (or, more exactly, injunctive) to the root ghas- 'swallow', as follows: ghs-t-a > *gzdha, whence gdha by the regular loss of a sibilant between stops in Indic. While the idea of voicing affecting the whole cluster with the release feature conventionally called aspiration penetrating all the way to the end of the sequence is not entirely unthinkable, the alternative – the spread of a phonational state (but murmur rather than voice) through the whole sequence – involves one less step and therefore via Occam's razor counts as the better interpretation.

Bartholomae's law intersects with another Indic development, namely what looks like the deaspiration of aspirated stops in clusters with s: descriptively, Proto-Indo-European *leyǵʰ-si 'you lick' becomes *leyksi, whence Sanskrit lekṣi. However, Grassmann's law, whereby an aspirated stop becomes non-aspirated before another aspirated stop (as in the example of buddha, above), suggests something else. In late Vedic and later forms of Sanskrit, all forms behave as though aspiration was simply lost in clusters with s, so such forms to the root dugh- 'give milk' (etymologically *dhugh-) show the expected devoicing and deaspiration in, say, the desiderative formation du-dhukṣ-ati (with the root-initial dh- intact, that is, undissimulated). But the earliest passages of the Rigveda show something different: desiderative dudukṣati, aorist dukṣata (for later dhukṣata) and so on. Thus, it is apparent that what went into Grassmann's law were forms like *dhugzhata, dhudhugzha- and so on, with aspiration in the sibilant clusters intact. The deaspiration and devoicing of the sibilant clusters were later and entirely separate phenomena (and connected with yet another suite of specifically Indic sound laws, namely a "rule conspiracy" to eliminate all voiced – and murmured – sibilants). Even the example 'swallowed' given above contradicts the usual interpretation of devoicing and deaspiration: by such a sequence, *ghs-to gave, first, *ksto (if the process was already Indo-European) or *ksta (if Indo-Iranian in date), whence Sanskrit *kta, not gdha.

== Relative chronology ==
There is no evidence that Bartholomae's law predated Indo-Iranian, that is, that it was a feature of Proto-Indo-European. The Latin form lectus 'couch' and Ancient Greek léktron 'bed' are differently formed but both continue the Proto-Indo-European root *legʰ- 'lie' (the English word being from the same root). But because the Latin would otherwise have resulted in a forbidden cluster (**gt), it may well just be a case of voicing assimilation. In similar combinations arising within Greek, the pattern is for the whole cluster to become aspirated, thus **lékhthron. It obviously does not in this formation, which for other reasons as well is likely to be very old. This may be because the consonant cluster is more complex. In the case of Latin lectus, it is significant that the Proto-Indo-European root *legʰ- does not otherwise survive in Latin at all, so that there can be no history of analogical remodeling or other disturbances. It is not completely clear what the result of a sequence *-gʰdʰ- would have been in Latin, but other evidence suggests lengthening of the vowel plus simplification, so **lēgus (cf. co-āgulum 'rennet' < *-ǎg-dʰlo-, tēgula 'roofing tile' < *tek-dʰlo-).

== See also ==
- Glossary of sound laws in the Indo-European languages
- Sandhi
