= GOST 7.79-2000 =

Cyrillic transliteration standard

GOST 7.79-2000 (Система стандартов по информации, библиотечному и издательскому делу. Правила транслитерации кирилловского письма латинским алфавитом) is a standard for transliteration from Cyrillic to Latin script for use on the internet, for speakers of languages that are normally written in Cyrillic script but who do not have access to a Cyrillic keyboard. It came into effect 2002-07-01.

GOST 7.79-2000 contains two transliteration tables.

System A
one Cyrillic character to one Latin character, some with diacritics – identical to ISO 9:1995 (except for ю̄ as ů in ISO 9:1995 and ū̂ in GOST 7.79-2000)
System B
one Cyrillic character to one or many Latin characters without combining diacritics. The following languages are mentioned in the published System B description: Russian, Belarusian, Ukrainian, Bulgarian, Macedonian. Cyrillic letters are distinguished by specific usage of Latin letters h, y, c as well as a spacing diacritic (grave accent, `). When used on Moscow street signs may instead be the traditional prime (i.e., ʹ), depending on who printed the sign.

== GOST 7.79 System B ==
GOST 7.79 System B
Cyrillic		Roman		Note
А	а	A	a	
Б	б	B	b	
В	в	V	v	
Г	г	G	g	
Ѓ	ѓ	G`	g`	in Macedonian
Д	д	D	d	
Е	е	E	e	
Ё	ё	Yo	yo	in Russian and Belarusian
Є	є	Ye	ye	in Ukrainian
Ж	ж	Zh	zh	
З	з	Z	z	
Ѕ	ѕ	Z`	z`	in Macedonian
И	и	I, Y`	i, y`	i in Russian, Belarusian and Macedonian, y` in Ukrainian
Й	й	J	j	
Ј	ј	J	j	in Macedonian
І	і	I, I`	i, i`	i` only in Old Russian before consonants (e.g. in міръ "world") i elsewhere
Ї	ї	Yi	yi	in Ukrainian
К	к	K	k	
Ќ	ќ	K`	k`	in Macedonian
Л	л	L	l	
Љ	љ	L`	l`	in Macedonian
М	м	M	m	
Н	н	N	n	
Њ	њ	N`	n`	in Macedonian
О	о	O	о	
П	п	P	p	
Р	р	R	r	
С	с	S	s	
Т	т	T	t	
У	у	U	u	
Ў	ў	U`	u`	in Belarusian
Ф	ф	F	f	
Х	х	X	x	
Ц	ц	Cz, C	cz, с	it is recommended to use c before i, e, y, j and cz elsewhere
Ч	ч	Ch	ch	
Џ	џ	Dh	dh	in Macedonian
Ш	ш	Sh	sh	
Щ	щ	Shh, Sth	shh, sth	shh for Russian and Ukrainian, sth for Bulgarian
Ъ	ъ	``, A`	``, a`	`` (double grave accent) in Russian, a` in Bulgarian
Ы	ы	Y`	y`	in Russian and Belarusian
Ь	ь	`		(single) grave accent; in Russian, Belarusian, Ukrainian and Bulgarian
Э	э	E`	e`	in Russian and Belarusian
Ю	ю	Yu	yu	in Russian, Belarusian, Ukrainian and Bulgarian
Я	я	Ya	уа	in Russian, Belarusian, Ukrainian and Bulgarian
ʼ				apostrophe
Ѣ	ѣ	Ye	уе	in (Old) Russian and Bulgarian
Ѳ	ѳ	Fh	fh	in (Old) Russian and Bulgarian
Ѵ	ѵ	Yh	yh	in (Old) Russian and Bulgarian
Ѫ	ѫ	O`	о`	in (Old) Bulgarian

The Ukrainian letter ge (ґ) is not mentioned in the System B table, although it appears in System A.

This standard (System B) appears to have been used in 2014 for the transliteration of street names on street signs in Moscow; its unusual appearance and non-intuitive sound values gave rise to criticism in the media.

=== National adoptions ===
The verbatim translated text of ISO 9 is adopted as an inter-state standard in the countries listed below (the national designation is shown in parentheses). Other transcription schemes are also used in practice, though.

- Russia (GOST 7.79)
- Armenia (GOST 7.79)
- Azerbaijan (GOST 7.79)
- Belarus (GOST 7.79–2000, adopted 2003-03-01)
- Kazakhstan (GOST 7.79)
- Kyrgyzstan (GOST 7.79)
- Tajikistan (GOST 7.79)
- Turkmenistan (GOST 7.79)
- Uzbekistan (GOST 7.79)

== See also ==
- Romanization of Russian
- Romanization of Ukrainian
- GOST standards
- GOST 16876-71
