= ALA-LC romanization for Russian =

The American Library Association and Library of Congress Romanization Tables for Russian, or the Library of Congress system, are a set of rules for the romanization of Russian-language text from the Russian alphabet, which uses the Cyrillic script, to Latin script.

== Background ==
The ALA-LC Romanization tables comprise a set of standards for romanization of texts in various languages, written in non-Latin writing systems. These romanization systems are intended for bibliographic cataloguing, and used in US and Canadian libraries, by the British Library since 1975, and in many publications worldwide.

The romanization tables were first discussed by the American Library Association in 1885, and published in 1904 and 1908, including rules for romanizing some languages written in Cyrillic script: Church Slavic, Serbo-Croatian, and Russian in the pre-reform alphabet. Revised tables including more languages were published in 1941, and a since-discontinued version of the entire standard was printed in 1997. The system for Russian remains virtually unchanged from 1941 to the latest release, with the current Russian table published online in 2012.

== Table ==
The formal, unambiguous version of the system requires some diacritics and two-letter tie characters which are often omitted in practice.

The table below combines material from the ALA-LC tables for Russian (2012) and, for some obsolete letters, Church Slavic (2011).

Romanization table
| Russian letter | | Romanization | | Examples |
|---|---|---|---|---|
| А | а | A | a | Азов = Azov; Тамбов = Tambov |
| Б | б | B | b | Барнаул = Barnaul; Кубань = Kubanʹ |
| В | в | V | v | Владимир = Vladimir; Ульяновск = Ulʹi͡anovsk |
| Г | г | G | g | Грозный = Groznyĭ; Волгодонск = Volgodonsk |
| Д | д | D | d | Дзержинский = Dzerzhinskiĭ; Нелидово = Nelidovo |
| Е | е | E | e | Елизово = Elizovo; Чебоксары = Cheboksary |
| Ё | ё | Ë | ë | Ёлкин = Ëlkin; Озёрный = Ozërnyĭ |
| Ж | ж | Zh | zh | Жуков = Zhukov; Лужники = Luzhniki |
| З | з | Z | z | Звенигород = Zvenigorod; Вязьма = Vi͡azʹma |
| И | и | I | i | Иркутск = Irkutsk; Апатиты = Apatity |
| Й | й | Ĭ | ĭ | Йошкар-Ола = Ĭoshkar-Ola; Бийск = Biĭsk |
| К | к | K | k | Киров = Kirov; Енисейск = Eniseĭsk |
| Л | л | L | l | Ломоносов = Lomonosov; Нелидово = Nelidovo |
| М | м | M | m | Менделеев = Mendeleev; Каменка = Kamenka |
| Н | н | N | n | Новосибирск = Novosibirsk; Кандалакша = Kandalaksha |
| О | о | O | o | Омск = Omsk; Красноярск = Krasnoi͡arsk |
| П | п | P | p | Петрозаводск = Petrozavodsk; Серпухов = Serpukhov |
| Р | р | R | r | Ростов = Rostov; Северобайкальск = Severobaĭkalʹsk |
| С | с | S | s | Сковородино = Skovorodino; Чайковский = Chaǐkovskiĭ |
| Т | т | T | t | Тамбов = Tambov; Мытищи = Mytishchi |
| У | у | U | u | Углич = Uglich; Дудинка = Dudinka |
| Ф | ф | F | f | Фурманов = Furmanov; Уфа = Ufa |
| Х | х | Kh | kh | Хабаровск = Khabarovsk; Прохладный = Prokhladnyĭ |
| Ц | ц | T͡S | t͡s | Цимлянск = T͡Simli͡ansk; Ельцин = Elʹt͡sin |
| Ч | ч | Ch | ch | Чебоксары = Cheboksary; Печора = Pechora |
| Ш | ш | Sh | sh | Шахтёрск = Shakhtërsk; Мышкин = Myshkin |
| Щ | щ | Shch | shch | Щёлково = Shchëlkovo; Ртищево = Rtishchevo |
| Ъ | ъ | ʺ | ʺ | Подъездной = Podʺezdnoĭ |
| Ы | ы | Y | y | Ыттык-Кёль = Yttyk-Këlʹ; Тында = Tynda |
| Ь | ь | ʹ | ʹ | Тюмень = Ti͡umenʹ |
| Э | э | Ė | ė | Электрогорск = Ėlektrogorsk; Радиоэлектроника = Radioėlektronika |
| Ю | ю | I͡U | i͡u | Юбилейный = I͡Ubileǐnyǐ; Ключевская = Kli͡uchevskai͡a |
| Я | я | I͡A | i͡a | Якутск = I͡Akutsk Брянск = Bri͡ansk |
Letters eliminated in the orthographic reform of 1918
| І | і | І̄ | ī | |
| Ѣ | ѣ | I͡E | i͡e | |
| Ѳ | ѳ | Ḟ | ḟ | |
| Ѵ | ѵ | Ẏ | ẏ | |
Church Slavic letters
| Ѣ | ѣ | Ě | ě | |
| Ѳ | ѳ | Ḟ | ḟ | |
| Ѷ | ѷ,у | Ẏ | ẏ | v̇ if used without diacritic marks |
| Щ | щ | Sht | sht | |
| Є | є | Ē | ē | |
| Ѥ | ѥ | I͡E | i͡e | |
| Ѕ | ѕ | Ż | ż | |
| Ꙋ | ꙋ | Ū | ū | |
| Ѿ | ѿ | Ō͡T | ō͡t | |
| Ѡ | ѡ | Ō | ō | |
| Ѧ | ѧ | Ę | ę | |
| Ѯ | ѯ | K͡S | k͡s | |
| Ѱ | ѱ | P͡S | p͡s | |
| Ѫ | ѫ | Ǫ | ǫ | |
| Ѩ | ѩ | I͡Ę | i͡ę | |
| Ѭ | ѭ | I͡Ǫ | i͡ǫ | |

== See also ==
- Scientific transliteration of Cyrillic (1898)
- Preußische Instruktionen (PI) (1899)
- Romanization of Russian
