= Christian Bartholomae =

German historical linguist (1855–1925)

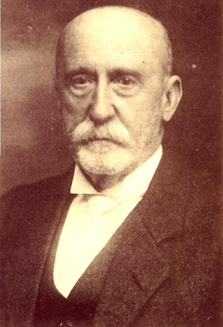
- Born: Friedrich Christian Leonhard Bartholomae; 21 January 1855; Forst ob Limmersdorf, Kingdom of Bavaria (now Forstleithen, Germany)
- Died: 9 August 1925 (aged 70); Langeoog, Weimar Republic (now Langeoog, Germany)
- Known for: Bartholomae's law
- Scientific career
- Fields: linguistics, Indo-European studies, Iranian languages, historical linguistics

Friedrich Christian Leonhard Bartholomae (21 January 1855 – 9 August 1925) was a German linguist, philologist, and scholar of the Iranian languages. He is best known as the namesake of Bartholomae's law, a sound law affecting the Indo-Iranian language family.

== Biography ==
Bartholomae was born in Forst ob Limmersdorf, then a part of the Kingdom of Bavaria, on 21 January 1855 to a forester father. Initially educated in Bayreuth, he began studying classical languages at the Ludwig-Maximilians-Universität München and the University of Erlangen, including under Friedrich von Spiegel. Afterward, he studied at Leipzig University, focusing on Sanskrit and comparative philology. He achieved his habilitation from the University of Halle-Wittenberg in 1879, where five years later he was appointed as a professor. The following year, he left for the University of Münster, before being appointed to a full professorship at the University of Giessen. During his time there, he developed and published his work on what would later be known as Bartholomae's law, solving a sound problem in Proto-Indo-Iranian. He worked at the University of Giessen until 1909, when he was appointed the successor of his long-time mentor Heinrich Hübschmann at the University of Strasbourg. However, the same year, he left his appointment yet again to teach at Heidelberg University, where he taught comparative philology and Sanskrit until he retired in 1924.

Bartholomae died on the East Frisian island of Langeoog on 9 August 1925.
