= Romanization of Russian =

Romanization of the Russian alphabet

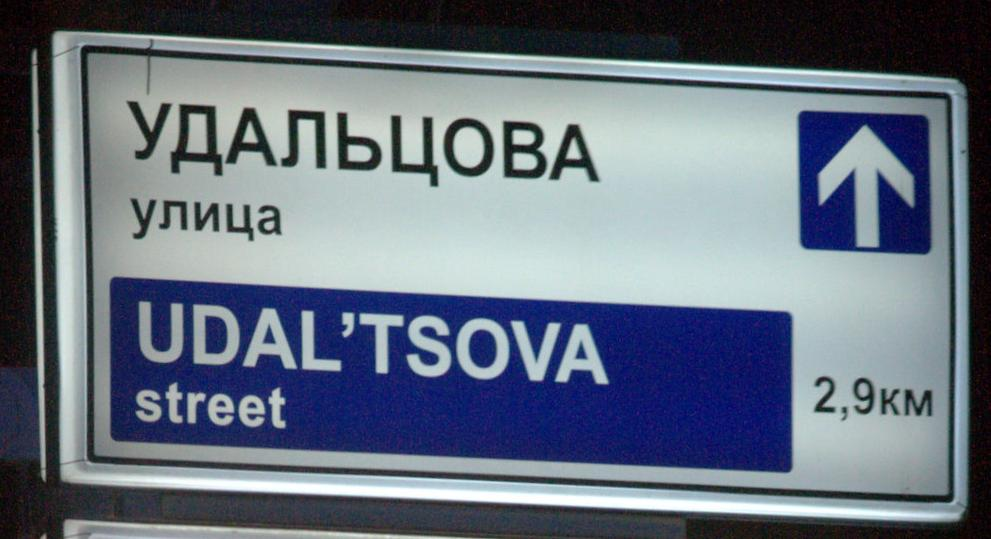
A street sign in Russia with the name of a street shown in Cyrillic and Latin characters

The romanization of the Russian language (the transliteration of Russian text from the Cyrillic script into the Latin script), aside from its primary use for including Russian names and words in text written in a Latin alphabet, is also essential for computer users to input Russian text who either do not have a keyboard or word processor set up for inputting Cyrillic, or else are not capable of typing rapidly using a native Russian keyboard layout (JCUKEN). In the latter case, they would type using a system of transliteration fitted for their keyboard layout, such as for English QWERTY keyboards, and then use an automated tool to convert the text into Cyrillic.

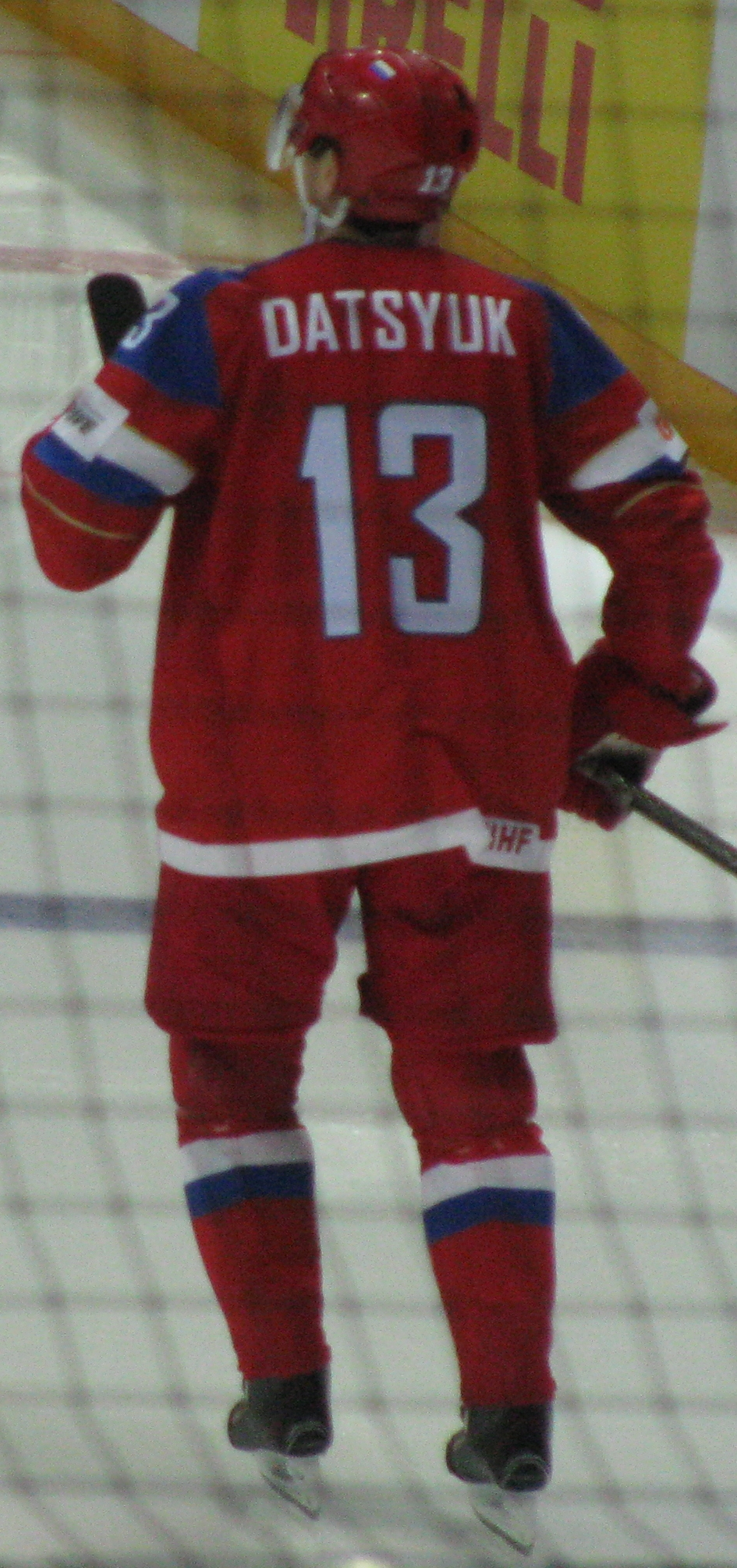
Pavel Datsyuk (Cyrillic: Павел Дацюк), a former NHL and international ice hockey player, wearing a sweater with Latin characters

== Systematic transliterations of Cyrillic to Latin ==
There are a number of distinct and competing standards for the romanization of Russian Cyrillic, with none of them having received much popularity, and, in reality, transliteration is often carried out without any consistent standards.

=== Scientific transliteration ===
Scientific transliteration, also known as the International Scholarly System, is a system that has been used in linguistics since the 19th century. It is based on the Czech alphabet and formed the basis of the GOST and ISO systems.

=== GOST ===
==== OST 8483 ====
OST 8483 was the first Soviet standard on romanization of Russian, introduced on 16 October 1935.

==== GOST 16876-71 (1973) ====
Developed by the National Administration for Geodesy and Cartography at the USSR Council of Ministers, GOST 16876-71 has been in service since 1973. Replaced by GOST 7.79-2000.

==== ST SEV 1362 (1978) ====
This standard is an equivalent of GOST 16876-71 and was adopted as an official standard of the COMECON.

==== GOST 7.79-2000 (2002) ====
GOST 7.79-2000 System of Standards on Information, Librarianship, and Publishing–Rules for Transliteration of the Cyrillic Characters Using the Latin Alphabet is an adoption of ISO 9:1995. It is the official standard of both Russia and the Commonwealth of Independent States (CIS).

==== GOST 52535.1-2006 (2006) ====
GOST 52535.1-2006 Identification cards. Machine readable travel documents. Part 1. Machine readable passports is an adoption of an ICAO standard for travel documents. It was used in Russian passports for a short period during 2010–2013 (see below). The standard was substituted in 2013 by GOST R ISO/IEC 7501-1-2013, which does not contain romanization, but directly refers to the ICAO romanization (see below).

==== Street and road signs ====
Names on street and road signs in the Soviet Union were romanized according to GOST 10807-78 (tables 17, 18), which was amended by newer Russian GOST R 52290-2004 (tables Г.4, Г.5), the romanizations in both the standards are practically identical.

=== ISO ===
==== ISO/R 9 ====
ISO/R 9, established in 1954 and updated in 1968, was the adoption of the scientific transliteration by the International Organization for Standardization (ISO). It covers Russian and seven other Slavic languages.

==== ISO 9 ====
ISO 9:1995 is the current transliteration standard from ISO. It is based on its predecessor ISO/R 9:1968, which it deprecates; for Russian, the two are the same except in the treatment of five modern letters. ISO 9:1995 is the first language-independent, univocal system of one character for one character equivalents (by the use of diacritics) that faithfully represents the original and allows for reverse transliteration for Cyrillic text in any contemporary language.

=== United Nations romanization system ===
The UNGEGN, a Working Group of the United Nations, in 1987 recommended a romanization system for geographical names, which was based on the 1983 version of GOST 16876-71. It may be found in some international cartographic products.

=== Library of Congress (ALA-LC) ===
American Library Association and Library of Congress (ALA-LC) romanization tables for Slavic alphabets are used in North American libraries and in the British Library since 1975.

The formal, unambiguous version of the system for bibliographic cataloguing requires some diacritics, two-letter tie characters, and prime marks. The standard is also often adapted as a "simplified" or "modified Library of Congress system" for use in text for a non-specialized audience, omitting the special characters and diacritics, simplifying endings, and modifying iotated initials.

=== British Standard ===
British Standard 2979:1958 is the main system of the Oxford University Press, and a variation was used by the British Library to catalogue publications acquired up to 1975. The Library of Congress system (ALA-LC) is used for newer acquisitions.

=== BGN/PCGN ===
The BGN/PCGN system is relatively intuitive for Anglophones to read and pronounce. In many publications, a simplified form of the system is used to render English versions of Russian names, typically converting ë to yo, simplifying -iy and -yy endings to -y, and omitting apostrophes for ъ and ь. It can be rendered using only the basic letters and punctuation found on English-language keyboards: no diacritics or unusual letters are required, although the interpunct character (·) may be used to avoid ambiguity.

This particular standard is part of the BGN/PCGN romanization system which was developed by the United States Board on Geographic Names and by the Permanent Committee on Geographical Names for British Official Use. The portion of the system pertaining to the Russian language was adopted by BGN in 1944 and by PCGN in 1947.

=== Transliteration of names on Russian passports ===
In Soviet international passports, transliteration was based on French rules but without diacritics and so all names were transliterated in a French-style system.

In 1997, with the introduction of new Russian passports, a diacritic-free English-oriented system was established by the Russian Ministry of Internal Affairs, but the system was also abandoned in 2010.

In 2006, GOST R 52535.1-2006 was adopted, which defines technical requirements and standards for Russian international passports and introduces its own system of transliteration. In 2010, the Federal Migration Service of Russia approved Order No. 26, stating that all personal names in the passports issued after 2010 must be transliterated using GOST R 52535.1-2006. Because of some differences between the new system and the old one, citizens who wanted to retain the old version of a name's transliteration, especially one that had been in the old pre-2010 passport, could apply to the local migration office before they acquired a new passport. The standard was abandoned in 2013.

In 2013, Order No. 320 of the Federal Migration Service of Russia came into force. It states that all personal names in the passports must be transliterated by using the ICAO system, which is published in Doc 9303 "Machine Readable Travel Documents, Part 3". The system differs from the GOST R 52535.1-2006 system in two things: ц is transliterated into ts (as in pre-2010 systems), ъ is transliterated into ie (a novelty).

== Transliteration table ==
Common systems for romanizing Russian
Cyrillic	Variants	Scholarly	ISO/R 9:1968	GOST 16876-71(1); UNGEGN (1987)	GOST 16876-71(2)	ISO 9:1995; GOST 7.79-2000(A)	GOST 7.79-2000(B)	Road signs	ALA-LC	BS 2979:1958	BGN/PCGN	Passport (1997)	Passport (2010)	Passport (2013), ICAO
А/а	a													
Б/б	b													
В/в	v													
Г/г	g													
Д/д	d													
Е/е	e, ye	e						e (ye) (Note: е = ye initially, after vowels, and after ъ and ь.)	e		e (ye) (Note: The digraphs ye and yë are used to indicate iotation at the beginning of a word, after vowels, and after й, ъ or ь.)	e (ye) (Note: ye after ь.)	e	
Ё/ё	ë, jo, yo, ye, yë	ë			jo	ë	yo	e (ye, yo) (Note: ё = ye after consonants except ч, ш, щ, ж (ch, sh, shch, zh); = e after ч, ш, щ, ж (ch, sh, shch, zh); = yo initially, after vowels, and after ъ and ь.)	ë	ë (Note: Diacritics may be omitted when back-transliteration is not required.)	ë (yë)	e (ye)	e	
Ж/ж	ž, zh	ž			zh	ž	zh							
З/з	z													
И/и	i													
Й/й	j, y, ĭ, i	j			j (jj) (Note: jj is accepted if reverse transliteration is needed)	j		y	ĭ	ĭ	y (Note: An optional middle dot (·) may be used to signify: non-digraphs (тс = t·s, шч = sh·ch); y· = й before а, у, ы, э (йа = y·a, йу = y·u, йы = y·y, йэ = y·e); y· = ы before а, у, ы, э (ыа = y·a, ыу = y·u, ыы = y·y, ыэ = y·e); ·y = ы after vowels; ·e = э after consonants except й.)	y (Note: ий is either iy or y, and ый is either y or yy.)	i	
К/к	k													
Л/л	l													
М/м	m													
Н/н	n													
О/о	o													
П/п	p													
Р/р	r													
С/с	s									s (Note: тс is romanized t-s to distinguish it from ц = ts.)	s			
Т/т	t									t	t			
У/у	u													
Ф/ф	f													
Х/х	x, h, kh, ch	x (ch)	ch	h	kh	h	x	kh						
Ц/ц	c, cz, ts, t͡s, tc	c					cz (c) (Note: It is recommended to use c before i, e, y, j, but cz in all other cases.)	ts	t͡s	ts	ts	ts	tc	ts
Ч/ч	č, ch	č			ch	č	ch							
Ш/ш	š, sh	š			sh	š	sh							
Щ/щ	ŝ, šč, shch, shh	šč, ŝ	šč	ŝ	shh	ŝ	shh	shch			shch	shch		
Ъ/ъ (Note: Unicode recommends encoding the primes used for the soft and hard signs as U+02B9 ʹ MODIFIER LETTER PRIME and U+02BA ʺ MODIFIER LETTER DOUBLE PRIME, and the apostrophes for the same as the modifier letter apostrophes, U+02BC ʼ MODIFIER LETTER APOSTROPHE and U+02EE ˮ MODIFIER LETTER DOUBLE APOSTROPHE.)	ʺ, ʼ, ˮ, ", ie	ʺ						ʼ	ʺ (Note: Before the 2012 revision of the table, ъ was not romanized at the end of a word. Since that date, it is always romanized.)	ˮ (") (Note: ъ is not romanized at the end of a word.)	ˮ	ʺ	–	ie
Ы/ы	y, y', ȳ, ui	y								ȳ (ui) (Note: The British Library uses ы = ui, ый = uy.)	y	y		
Ь/ь	ʹ, ʼ, '	ʹ						ʼ	ʹ	ʼ (')	ʼ	—	—	—
Э/э	ė, è, eh, e, é	è		ė	eh	è	e'	e	ė	é	e	e		
Ю/ю	û, yu, ju, i͡u, iu	ju, û	ju			û	yu		i͡u	yu			iu	
Я/я	â, ya, ja, i͡a, ia	ja, â	ja			â	ya		i͡a	ya			ia	
Pre-1918 letters
І/і	i, ì, ī, i'	i			—	ì	i (i') (Note: In GOST 7.79-2000 Cyrillic і in Ukrainian and Bulgarian is always transliterated as Latin i as well as in Old Russian and Old Bulgarian texts where it is usually used before vowels. In the rare case that it falls before a consonant (for example, in the word міръ), it is transliterated with an apostrophe i'.)	—	ī		—	—	—	—
Ѳ/ѳ	f, ḟ, f̀, fh, th	f (th) (Note: Some archaic letters are transcribed in different ways.)	ḟ		—	f̀	fh	—	ḟ		—	—	—	—
Ѣ/ѣ	ě, ê, ye, i͡e	ě			—	ě	ye	—	i͡e	ê	—	—	—	—
Ѵ/ѵ	i, ẏ, ỳ, y̆, yh, ü	i (ü)	ẏ		—	ỳ	yh	—	ẏ	y̆	—	—	—	—
Pre-18th century letters
Є/є	ê, ē, e, je	ê (j)e	—	—	—	—	—	—	ē	—	—	—	—	—
Ѥ/ѥ	ẹ, i͡e	ẹ	—	—	—	—	—	—	i͡e	—	—	—	—	—
Ѕ/ѕ	ẑ, ż, ʒ, dz, js	dz (ʒ)	—	—	—	ẑ	js	—	ż	—	—	—	—	—
Ꙋ/ꙋ	ū, u	u	—	—	—	—	—	—	ū	—	—	—	—	—
Ѡ/ѡ	ô, ō, o	ô (o)	—	—	—	—	—	—	ō	—	—	—	—	—
Ѿ/ѿ	ôt, ō͡t, ot	ôt (ot)	—	—	—	—	—	—	ō͡t	—	—	—	—	—
Ѫ/ѫ	ą, ǎ, u	ą (u)	—	—	—	ǎ	—	—	ą	—	—	—	—	—
Ѧ/ѧ	ę, ja	ę (ja)	—	—	—	—	—	—	ę	—	—	—	—	—
Ѭ/ѭ	ją, ju, i͡ą	ją (ju)	—	—	—	—	—	—	i͡ą	—	—	—	—	—
Ѩ/ѩ	ję, ja, i͡ę	ję (ja)	—	—	—	—	—	—	i͡ę	—	—	—	—	—
Ѯ/ѯ	x, k͡s	x	—	—	—	—	—	—	k͡s	—	—	—	—	—
Ѱ/ѱ	ps, p͡s	ps	—	—	—	—	—	—	p͡s	—	—	—	—	—

== Latin script ==
In a second sense, the romanization or Latinization of Russian may also indicate the introduction of a dedicated Latin alphabet for writing the Russian language. Such an alphabet would not necessarily bind closely to the traditional Cyrillic orthography. The transition from Cyrillic to Latin has been proposed several times throughout history (especially during the Soviet era), but was never conducted on a large scale, except for informal romanizations in the computer era.

The most serious possibility of adoption of a Latin alphabet for the Russian language was discussed in 1929–30 during the campaign of latinisation of the languages of the USSR, when a special commission was created to propose a latinisation system for Russian.

=== Latin letter names in Russian ===
The letters of the Latin script are named in Russian as following (and are borrowed from French and/or German):

- A: a (а)
- B: be (бэ)
- C: ce (цэ)
- D: de (дэ)
- E: je or e (е) or (э)
- F: ef (эф)
- G: ge or že (гэ) or (жэ)
- H: aš or ha (аш) or (ха)
- I: i (и)
- J: jot or ži (йот) or (жи)
- K: ka (ка)
- L: elʹ (эль)
- M: em (эм)
- N: en (эн)
- O: o (о)
- P: pe (пэ)
- Q: ku (ку)
- R: er (эр)
- S: es (эс)
- T: te (тэ)
- U: u (у)
- V: ve (вэ)
- W: dublʹ-ve (дубль-вэ)
- X: iks (икс)
- Y: igrek (игрек) or ipsilon (ипсилон)
- Z: zet (зет)

== See also ==
- Scientific transliteration of Cyrillic
- Romanization of Belarusian
- Romanization of Bulgarian
- Romanization of Macedonian
- Romanization of Serbian
- Romanization of Ukrainian
- Faux Cyrillic
- Russian Latin alphabet
- Template:ru-IPA for the Wiktionary template to automatically generate pronunciation for Russian words
