= Heydar Raqabi =

Iranian poet and political activist (1931–1987)

Haydar Raqabi حیدر رقابی
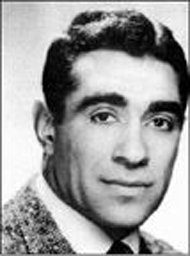
- Born: Haydar Ali Raqabi; December 10, 1931; Tehran, Iran
- Died: December 14, 1987 (aged 56); Tehran, Iran
- Resting place: Ibn Babawayh Cemetery; Rey, Iran
- Other names: Heydar Ali Raqabi; Haleh (pen name)
- Education: International law
- Alma mater: Columbia University (PhD)
- Occupations: Poet, professor, political activist
- Known for: The lyricist of the song Mara Beboos (Kiss Me)
- Political party: National Front of Iran
- Movement: Nationalization of the Iranian oil industry

Heydar Raqabi (Persian: حیدر رقابی; 10 December 1931 – 14 December 1987), was an Iranian poet and political activist known by the pseudonym "Haleh".

== Biography ==
Heydar Raqabi, or Haydar Ali Raqabi, was born on December 10, 1931. His father was the brother-in-law of Mohammad-Hassan Shamshiri, who was a follower of Dr. Mohammad Mosaddegh; and his mother was the cousin of Bijan Taraghi, a lyricist.

Raqabi himself was a supporter of the National Front of Iran from his youth and actively participated in the nationalization of the Iranian oil industry.

Raqabi had a talent for lyricism and adopted the pen name "Haleh" in his poetry. However, he gained more recognition for the song "Mara Beboos" ("Kiss Me"), performed by Hassan Golnaraghi.

Regarding his relationship with Raqabi and the creation and performance of "Mara Beboos', Bijan Taraghi states: "Raqabi had an enthusiastic and combative nature. He quickly joined the ranks of Dr. Mossadegh's supporters and the National Front. Continuously standing beside politicians, he utilized his poetic talent in the context of national and enthusiastic themes. With passion and excitement, he delivered his poems with a resonant voice and fiery words to his fellow comrades during meetings through loudspeakers."

=== Political activities ===
Former editor-in-chief of the "Sobh Iran" newspaper, Nasser Anghata, writes:

Heydar Raqabi (Haleh), who led the "Soldiers of the National Front" organization before August 28, and was a staunch nationalist, was chosen as the head of the Committee for the Resistance Movement at Tehran University.

Due to his activities in the National Resistance Movement, Haleh was imprisoned. He served as the head of the organizational committee of the National Resistance Movement at Tehran University in the years 1951, 1952, and 1953. Through Shemshiri's mediation, he was released from prison with the condition of leaving Iran.

=== Other ventures ===
After his release from prison in 1955, Raqabi left Iran and pursued studies in international law at Columbia University in New York City. Despite obtaining his bachelor's and master's degrees in law, Raqabi faced challenges due to his political activities and opposition to the government following the 1953 Iranian coup d'état. He became entangled with the Iranian embassy in the United States, and when embassy pressures intensified, he was compelled to move to Germany where he badged his doctoral degree in philosophy at the University of Berlin.

In Berlin, he continued his political activities and established the National Student Organization founding a weekly four-page newspaper called Pishva. (Note: a title given by Dr. Hussein Fatemi to Mossadegh) Raqabi was a close associate of Khosrow Qashqai, a member of the National Front of Iran. In the early 1940s, when Khosrow Ghashghai published the magazine Bakhtar Emrooz in Germany, Raqabi was also involved. (Bakhtar Emrooz was Dr. Hussein Fatemi's magazine during the nationalization of oil.)

Raqabi's doctoral thesis for his PhD examination was titled "The Revolutionary School of Nations", predicting the eventual reunification of East and West Germany. The thesis was published as a book at the expense of Willy Brandt, the Chancellor of Germany. After completing his studies in Germany, Raqabi returned to the United States and engaged in teaching international law at various universities.

Following the Iranian Revolution in February 1979, after 24 years of absence from his homeland, Raqabi returned to Iran. He resumed teaching at a university, but after the Cultural Revolution, obstacles were imposed on his continued academic work.

Ten years after his return, due to spleen cancer, Raqabi was hospitalized at the UCLA Medical Center in California. With his deteriorating health, and with the intervention of his brother, Jahanegir Raqabi, in the final days of his life, he returned to Iran once again and died in Tehran on December 14, 1987. He is buried in the Ibn Babawayh Cemetery in Rey, Iran.

== Career ==
=== Poetry ===
Mara Beboos مرا ببوس (Kiss Me)
This song, which was sung for the first time by Betul Rezaei and then reached the peak of popularity with the re-singing of Hasan Gol Naraghi in 1957, is one of the most famous Iranian songs that had and has very wide political contexts.

Abdolrahim Jafari, the former manager of Amir Kabir Publishers, writes in his memoirs: "In the early days of 1950, during the struggles between the people, the government, and various left and right-wing factions, I became acquainted with an enthusiastic young man named Heydar Ali Raqabi, known among his friends as 'Bijan Taraghi.' He managed the bookshop 'Khiyam.' He was a nationalist, passionate, and a fervent supporter of Dr. Mohammad Mossadegh. He was a humble, faithful, and devout young man who actively participated in national struggles. He had a poetry collection titled 'Aseman Ashk' ('Sky of Tears'), which I printed in a thousand copies. In this collection, there was a poem titled 'Mara Beboos,' later composed into music by Majid Vafadar, a renowned violinist. The song gained popularity on Iranian radio and was broadcast numerous times upon the listeners' requests."

According to the Encyclopædia Iranica: Before leaving the country, Raqabi met his loyal friend Vafadar for the last time and asked him to compose music for a poem he had recently written. Raqabi started writing and promised to finish it before leaving the country. After spending his last night with his girlfriend, he called Vafadar from the airport and dictated the poem he had written, which was full of vibrant and emotional words.

Mara Beboos, Mara Beboos

For the last time, may God keep you, as I go toward my destiny

Our spring has passed, past times are gone, I am in search of destiny

In the midst of storms alongside sailors

We must pass through not only the storms but also the tumult

In the midnight, I make covenants with my beloved

Igniting fires in the mountains
