= Mara Beboos =

Famous Iranian song

Mara Beboos (kiss me)
- category: Tasnif
- Poem from: Heydar Raqabi
- The first singer: Batool Rezaei
- famous singer: Hassan Golnaraghi
- explanation: Betul Rezaei first performed this song, which reached peak popularity when it was re-recorded by Hasan Gol Naraghi in 1957. It is considered one of the most famous Iranian songs and has significant historical and contemporary political connotations.

"Mara Beboos" (Persian: 'مرا ببوس', meaning 'Kiss Me') is a musical composition with lyrics by Heydar Raqabi and music by Majid Vafadar. Initially performed by Qashqai singer Batool Rezaei under the stage name Parvaneh, it gained fame and widespread recognition through Hassan Golnaraghi's renowned rendition. This composition, in the Bayat-e Esfahan, accompanied by the violin of "Parviz Yahaghi" and the piano of "Moshir Homayoun Shahrdar", has become one of the enduring pieces in Persian traditional music.

The lyrics of "Mara Beboos" are part of Heydar Raqabi's poetry collection titled "آسمان اشک," (Sky of tears) published in 1950–51 by "Amir Kabir Publishers". In 1956, the song was featured in the film "اتهام " with the vocals of a singer named "Parvaneh," but it did not receive much attention. Subsequently, after the events of the "1953 Iranian coup d'état", the song "Mara Beboos" was broadcast for the first time on "Radio Iran" under a pseudonym.

مرا ببوس (Kiss Me)
This song, which was sung for the first time by Betul Rezaei and then reached the peak of popularity with the re-singing of Hasan Gol Naraghi in 1957, is one of the most famous Iranian songs that had and has very wide political contexts.

After the 1953 Iranian coup d'état on Radio Iran, the program "شما و رادیو" (You and Radio), hosted by "Kamal Mostajab al-Da'vah," was broadcast. Before playing the song, "Mostajab al-Da'vah" announced: "This composition has been recorded in a private session, and due to its unique appeal, we are taking the initiative to broadcast it." The term "private session" refers to the recording session of this song with the voice of "Golnaraghi" in Studio No. 8 of Radio Tehran.

This piece was performed by various singers in the 1960s, including Alireza Hosseinkhani, a singer and kamancheh player from the Lurs community. 'Mara Beboos' has endured as a song of resistance, representing the final hours before execution and serving as a cry against coups and the oppression of the Iranian people throughout history. However, Abdulrahim Jafari claims that Heydar Raqabi wrote this poem for a girl he loved and that it is not connected to the execution of Colonel Siyamak.

According to individuals like "Ali Tajvidi", "Parviz Yahaghi", and "Aziz Motazedi", the music of "Mara Beboos" is inspired by an ancient Greek melody.

== Different beliefs and more ==
There are various beliefs regarding the creation and singing of this song. For instance, Parviz Khatibi, the playwright, satirist, and well-known program maker at Radio Iran, writes in his memoir collection titled "Memories of Artists," published in a book called "Memories of Artists," about the recording of the song "Mara Beboos." He mentions:

"... One day, when the members of the large Radio orchestra had gathered in Studio 8, waiting for Ruhollah Khaleqi, Hassan Golnaraghi came to meet Parviz Yahaghi. Hassan, the son of a reputable market trader, had friendships with most artists... They guide him to the studio, where Parviz Yahaghi is playing the violin, and one of the musicians is playing the piano for the song 'Mara Beboos.' Parviz, looking at Golnaraghi, says: Listen to this song! Golnaraghi listens to the song a couple of times, humming it quietly to himself. Meanwhile, the person in charge of recording the music program, sitting behind the equipment, starts the machine and records the piece without anyone noticing. Golnaraghi, focused on his own work, goes about his business, and the person in charge of recording sends the recorded tape to Moeinian, the head of Radio Publications. When Moeinian and other officials listen to the tape, they decide to broadcast it and share the story with Parviz Yahaghi. Parviz says this will cost Golnaraghi dearly because he comes from a well-known religious family, and his father strongly opposes artistic activities. It is decided to invite Golnaraghi to the radio office and discuss the matter with him. Golnaraghi comes, confirms Yahaghi's statements, but due to the insistence of friends, agrees to broadcast the tape without mentioning the name, using an alias for the unknown singer..."

These statements are published in the "Shargh" newspaper without verifying the accuracy of this narrative, which remains mostly a detective story in Tehran itself, from "Parviz Yahaghi."

In the book "Artistic Memoirs" by Ismail Navaab Safa, a contemporary songwriter published under the name "The Story of the Candle," we read another account about the recording of this song. He cites Abbas Foroutan, who was in charge of the "You and Radio" program, which aired on Fridays on the radio in 1957, and writes:

"... One day, Mr. Mehdi Sohili, who was friends with Mr. Golnaraghi, brought him to me and said that Mr. Majid Vafadar had created an interesting song with lyrics by Mr. Heydar Raqebi, and Mr. Golnaraghi performs it very well. When they performed it, I realized that it was a new and very interesting piece and very suitable for broadcasting on your program. Mr. Vafadar was not present, but Mr. Mashayi Homayun and Parviz Yahaghi were there. After rehearsal, Mr. Golnaraghi, along with Mashayi Homayun on the piano and Yahaghi on the violin, performed it for the first time, and it was broadcast on radio on Friday and received a lot of attention..."

The song "Mara Beboos" with Golnaraghi's voice was not recorded and performed again. Whatever it was and is, it is the same version that was recorded in Studio 8 of Radio Iran, in Ark Square, Tehran.

During those days, people said and believed that Colonel Ezzatollah Siamak, one of the leaders of the Military Organization of the Iranian Tudeh Party, had composed this sad yet exhilarating song, describing the tragic fate of officers being executed, just before his execution on October 18, 1954, in prison.

Some believed that the second artillery colonel, Mohammad Ali Mobasheri, another member of the leadership of this organization, had composed this song, describing Colonel Siamak during his last meeting with his daughter on the night before the execution. Although later Golnaraghi, the singer of this song, in an interview with Iraj Tabibi Gilani in the magazine "Roshanfekr," after denying this claim for the first time, stated that the poet of this song is Heydar Raqebi, one of the professors in the literature department of the University of Tehran.

In the Encyclopedia Iranica, it is mentioned: When Raqebi saw his friend Vafadar for the last time before leaving the country, Vafadar asked him to write a poem for the music he had recently composed. Raqebi began to write and promised to finish it before leaving the country. After spending the last night with his girlfriend, he called from the airport and dictated the poem he had written for Vafadar, full of vibrant and emotional words.

=== Song lyrics ===
Kiss me, kiss me
For the last time, may God keep you as I go towards destiny
Our spring has passed, the past is gone, and I am in search of destiny
In the midst of the storm, a pact with the sailors
Passing through life requires passing through storms
In the middle of the night, I make pacts with my beloved
Setting fires ablaze in the mountains
Tonight, I'll travel through the dark, tread the path of darkness
Look, my flower, tears of sorrow on my eyelashes, shed for me
Beautiful girl tonight, I am your guest, I'll stay in front of you until you put your lips on mine
Beautiful girl, with the lightning of your gaze, your innocent tears, brighten my night tonight
The star of the man at the dawn, like an angel, my companion, casting a glance all around,
Swayed among the celestial beings.
In his last look, an innocent gaze, he sang his last song.
While I, from now on, have a heart on a different path.
I have a different excitement, a different fervor in my head.
In the bright morning, I must take that heart away because a bloody promise with a brighter morning
I have...has
Kiss me
This farewell kiss
Smells of blood

=== Singer ===
This work was initially performed by a singer with the artistic name Parvaneh, but it did not gain public popularity. However, with Hassan Golnaraghi's performance, it took on a different color and became a lasting piece.

Batoul Razavi, or Mrs. Mouchoul, was born in 1910 in Tehran, into a family of Qashqai from Shiraz. She played the sitar, tar, and sang Persian traditional music. She was the first person to record the sound of the sitar and sing simultaneously. She took up singing at the court of the Qajar under "Ekrām-al-Dowleh" and was also a disciple of "Reza Qoli-Khan Nowruzi". She recorded about 10 pages of music in the winter of 1927, capturing the sound of the sitar and her singing in the corners of Zabol and Mansoori. She died due to tuberculosis in 1933. She is buried in the Ibn Babawayh Cemetery in the south of Tehran. Her only child was a daughter named "Aghdas" who later, as an artist, sang like her mother using the artistic name "Khatereh Parvaneh".

Hassan Golnaraghi was born in 1921 in Abshar Street, Rey Street in Tehran. After completing his high school education, he engaged in his father's business of buying and selling antique glass and china. He gradually became a valuable expert in the field of antique studies, and practitioners in this field accepted his opinion. Hassan Golnaraghi had a short and medium-sized business for years in the glassware sellers' market in Tehran Bazaar. He was satisfied and honest in his work and was respected by glass and china merchants until the end of his life. He had a tall stature, white hair, and spoke calmly. Hassan Golnaraghi was a non-professional singer, and with the song "Mara Beboos," his name was included in the list of Iranian singers. Another song remaining from him is "Setare-ye Mard" (man star ) which never reached the popularity of the song "Mara Beboos." He died in 1993 aged 72. When a memorial ceremony was held for him in Tehran, the gathering of intellectuals who participated in his memorial was more than the merchants and small traders of the traditional market of Iran who had reached the government.

=== Poet ===
"Heydar Raqabi," also known as Heydar Ali Raqabi, with the pseudonym "Haleh," was a political activist in Iran during the 1950s. His father, was a supporter of "Mohammad Mosaddegh, and cashier in an expensive restaurant, and his mother was related to "Bijan Taraghi," a famous songwriter. Politically, Heydar was considered a nationalist with active engagement. He died at the end of the 1980s.

In reading the description that "Bijan Taraghi" has of "Heydar Raqabi," we see that his political activities are mostly portrayed as "scattering the opposition's gatherings" and "repeatedly getting injured and ending up in the hospital."
