= Fatemeh Sayyah =

Iranian professor of literature, women's rights activist (1902–1948)

- فاطمه سیاح
- Born: 1902; Moscow, Russia
- Died: 13 March 1948
- Resting place: Tehran, Iran
- Occupation: Professor of literature

Fatemeh Sayyah (1902 – 13 March 1948) was an Iranian professor of literature, co-founder of the Women's Center of the Iranian Ministry of Culture, and a women's rights activist.

She was the first woman to become a university professor in Iran. She held professorial chairs in Russian language and literature, as well as in foreign-language literature and comparative literature, at the University of Tehran.

== Biography ==
Fatemeh Sayyah was born in Moscow in 1902. Her father, a professor of Persian language and Persian literature in Moscow, had immigrated to Russia as a child. Her mother, of German origin, grew up in Russia. Sayyah completed her secondary and higher education in Moscow and earned a doctorate in European literature from Moscow State University. The subject of her doctoral thesis was: Anatole France in French literature.

In Moscow, she married her cousin, Hamid Sayyah, from whom she divorced after three years. In 1934, following the Russian Revolution, Sayyah moved to Iran with her father. In Iran, she became a member of the Ferdowsi millennial celebration, and taught French and Russian. She was appointed assistant professor at the University of Tehran in 1938 and promoted to full professor in 1943. She established the chair of literary criticism and comparative literature in the Department of Foreign Language Literature at the University of Tehran.

Fatemeh Sayyah died in Tehran on 13 March 1948, at the age of 45, from complications related to diabetes and a heart attack. She is buried at the Ibn Babawayh Cemetery.

== Works ==
Fatemeh Sayyah published numerous articles on European literature, as well as on Ferdowsi and Hafez, in Iranian magazines such as Iroz, Payam-e No, Mehr, and Sokhan. Her works include:

- Doctoral thesis on Anatole France.
- A Russian-language textbook for high schools, written at the request of the Ministry of Culture, in collaboration with Mehri Ahi and Gilde Berandet (Baku–Tehran, 1935).
- The History of Russian Literature, Volume One (posthumous), published by Saeed Nafisi in 1344 (Iranian calendar).
- Articles published in Iranian magazines, later collected by Mohammad Golban in Critiques et Voyages (Tehran: Ghatreh, 1974).

== Bibliography ==
- Hamid Dabashi, Reversing the colonial Gaze. Persian Travelers Abroad. Cambridge University Press, 2020.
