= Eye of the Hurricane (1989 film) =

First Graders
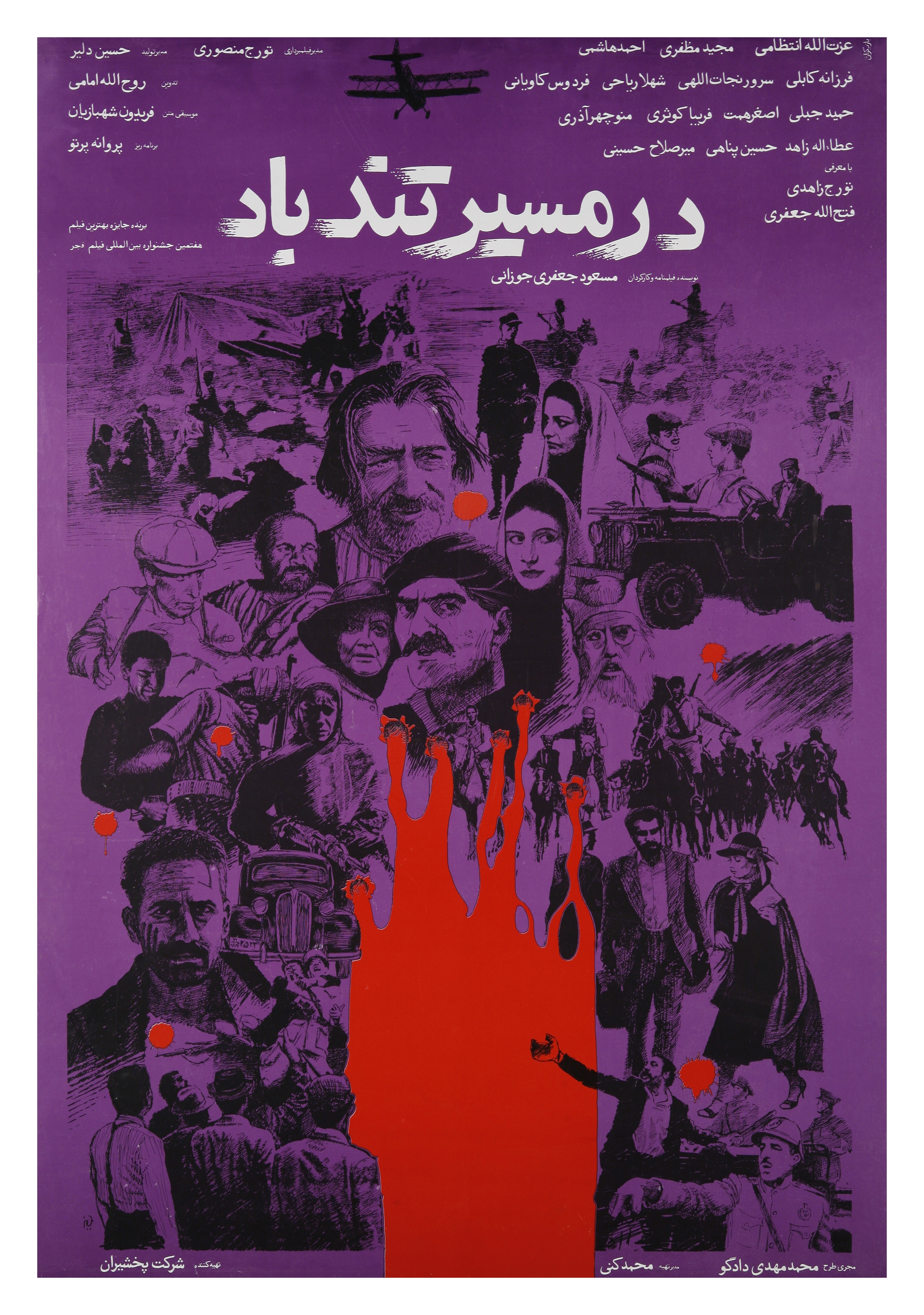
- Directed by: Masoud Jafari Jozani
- Written by: Masoud Jafari Jozani
- Produced by: Haroon Yashayayi
- Cinematography: Turaj Mansuri
- Edited by: Rouhollah Emami
- Music by: Fereydun Shahbazian
- Release date: 5 July 1989
- Country: Iran
- Language: Persian

Eye of the Hurricane (Persian: در مسیر تندباد,, romanized: Dar Masir Tondbad) is a 1989 film by the Iranian director Masoud Jafari Jozani. The film was set during World War II, during the occupation of Iran by the Allied Army. It stars actors Ezzatolah Entezami, Majid Mozaffari, Ataollah Zahed, and Ahmad Hashemi. The film won the Crystal Simorgh for best film at the Fajr International Film Festival.
