= Ataollah Zahed =

Iranian actor (1915–1991)

- عطاءالله زاهد
- Born: 1915; Shiraz, Fars province, Qajar Iran
- Died: 6 November 1991 (aged 75–76); Tehran, Iran
- Burial place: Ibn Babawayh Cemetery
- Education: University of Tehran, Marvi Theological School, Shahid Motahari University
- Occupations: Actor, film director, film producer, screenplay writer, voice-over actor, voice-over director, educator

Ataollah Zahed (Persian: عطاءالله زاهد; 1915 – 1991) also spelled as Ataullah Zahed, was an Iranian actor of theater, television, and film; a film director; film producer; screenplay writer; educator; and a voice-over actor and director.

== Biography ==
Ataollah Zahed was born in 1915 in Shiraz, Fars province, Qajar Iran. Around age 9 he started his artistic activities by acting in a play.

He attended the University of Tehran, where he received a B.A. degree in literature. He later studied Islamic jurisprudence at Marvi Theological School and Shahid Motahari University. Zahed was one of the founders of Hosseiniyeh Ershad, a non-traditional religious institute in Tehran, where he taught theater and cinema courses.

Zahed died of a heart attack on 6 November 1991, and is buried in Ibn Babawayh Cemetery in Ray, Greater Tehran.

== Filmography ==
=== Screenplay writer ===
- 1955 – The Incident of Life (Persian: Majeraye Zendegi)
- 1956 – Mother's Kiss (Persian: بوسه مادر, romanized: Booseh Madar)
- 1957 – Return to Life (film) (Persian: بازگشت به زندگی (فیلم ۱۳۳۶), romanized: Bazgasht Be Zendegi)
- 1958 – Awaited (Persian: چشم‌به‌راه (فیلم), romanized: Cheshm Berah)

=== Film producer ===
- 1958 – Awaited (Persian: چشم‌به‌راه (فیلم), romanized: Cheshm Berah)

=== Film director ===
- 1956 – Mother's Kiss (Persian: بوسه مادر, romanized: Booseh Madar)
- 1957 – Return to Life (film) (Persian: بازگشت به زندگی (فیلم ۱۳۳۶), romanized: Bazgasht Be Zendegi)
- 1958 – Awaited (Persian: چشم‌به‌راه (فیلم), romanized: Cheshm Berah)

=== Film actor ===
- 1979 – A Path to God (Persian: راهی به‌سوی خدا, romanized: Rahi Be Soo-ye Khoda)
- 1985 – Samandar (film) (Persian: سمندر (فیلم))
- 1986 – The Mare (Persian: مادیان (فیلم), romanized: Madian), as character Nooragha
- 1987 – The Spell (1987 film) (Persian: طلسم (فیلم), romanized: Telesm), as the marriage officiant
- 1987 – The Stone Lion (Persian: شیر سنگی (فیلم), romanized: Shir Sangi), as character Seyyed Mamad
- 1987 – Room One (film) (Persian: اتاق یک, romanized: Otagh-e yek)
- 1988 – Lead Age (Persian: دوران سربی, romanized: Doran-e Sorbi)
- 1988 – Barahoot (Persian: برهوت (فیلم))
- 1989 – Fish (film) (Persian: ماهی (فیلم), romanized: Mahi)
- 1989 – Eye of the Hurricane (Persian: در مسیر تندباد,, romanized: Dar Masir Tondbad)
- 1991 – Bride of Halabja (Persian: عروس حلبچه, romanized: Aroos-e Halabche)

=== Television series ===
He acted in the following television series:

- 1983–1985 – Sarbedaran (Persian: سربداران (مجموعه تلویزیونی))
- 1984 – Taleb (Persian: طالب (مجموعه تلویزیونی))
- 1987 – Avicenna (Persian: بوعلی سینا (مجموعه تلویزیونی), romanized: Bu-Ali Sina)
- 1987 – Hezardastan (Persian: هزاردستان, romanized: Hezār Dastān), on Channel 1, as character Seyyed Ebrahim Rohani, a rohani
