= Mahvash =

Iranian singer, dancer, movie actress and stage performer (1920–1961)

Mahvash مهوش
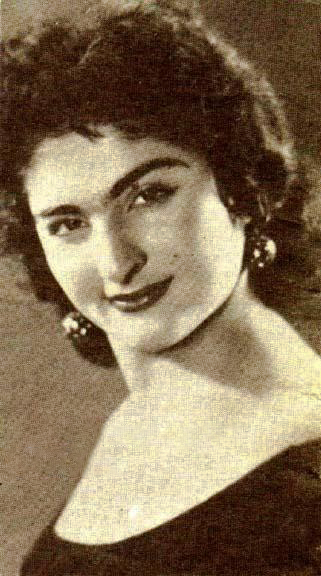

Background information
- Also known as: Mahvash Akram, Banu Mahvash, Ma'sumeh Azizi Borujerdi, Akram Ābgūshtī
- Born: Masumeh Azizi Borujerdi معصومه عزيزى بروجردى; 1920; Borujerd, Sublime State of Persia
- Died: 1961 (aged 40–41) Tehran, Imperial State of Iran
- Occupations: Singer, dancer, stage performer
- Years active: 1950–1961

Mahvash (Persian: مهوش; 1920–1961), born Masoumeh Azizi Borujerdi (Persian: معصومه عزيزى بروجردى), was an Iranian singer, dancer, film actress and stage performer. She came from a poor family and was lauded as a singer (performer) of the people in the 1950s.

== Early life and early career ==
Mahvash was born Masoumeh Azizi Borujerdi in Borujerd, Iran to a poor family, when Mahvash was a teenager the family came to Tehran. At an early age, Mahvash lost her mother. Later, she went on to perform in Tehran's cabarets (Persian: kafe-i motrebi) and cafes in the late 1940s to early 1950s and drew large support from the working people.

However, there is confusion around her biography, and different accounts of what type of performances were happening at this age and where. The most common story is that she performed risqué songs in the cabarets, on the radio and in movies. Another prevalent story is she began in a classical ruhowzi dance troupe as a dancer, pishparde singer, and actress; and she married a violinist who secured her entertainment engagements.

== Career ==
She gained the admiration of the masses by articulating in her songs the problems, difficulties, and frustrations of the common people, struggles which she knew very well. Her most famous songs involved a call and response-style singing with her male audience.

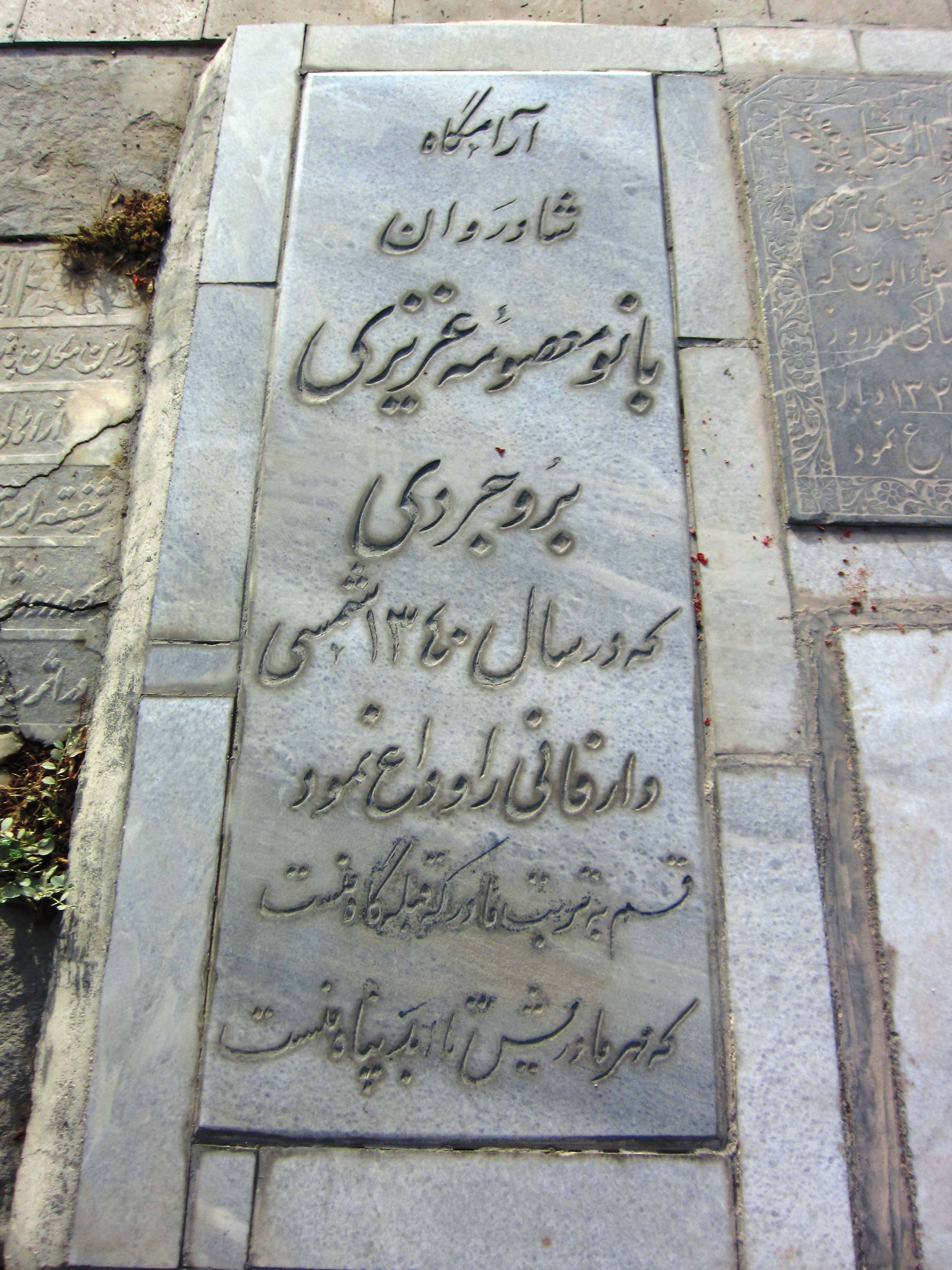
The grave of Mahvash at Ibn Babawayh Cemetery, Rey

She published a book in 1957 which she termed an "autobiography" which was entitled Secrets of Sexual Fulfillment (Persian: Raz-e Kamyabi-ye Jensi). This book was more of a sex manual, had pictures of her in a bathing suit, and was published and widely distributed despite being prosecuted for the book in June 1960. It seems that Mahvash's ability to speak to the marginalized majority absolved her of her forays into prostitution and other publicly indecent behavior.

When Mahvash died in a car accident in 1961, her public funeral was the largest of its day in Iran, with thousands of Iranians on the streets to mark her death. Iranian religious authorities were reluctant to permit her burial in a Muslim cemetery because as an entertainer she was considered unclean and unchaste; because of the large crowd mourning her death they relented.

She is buried in the Ibn Babawayh Cemetery in Tehran.

== Filmography ==
=== Acting ===
- 1956 – The Sun Shines (Persian: خورشید می‌درخشد, romanized: Khorshid Miderakhshad), with director Sardar Saker
- 1956 – Layla and Majnun (1956 film) (Persian: لیلی و مجنون, romanized: Leyli va Majnun), with director Ali-Mohammad Nourbakhsh
- 1957 – Ladder of Progress (Persian: نردبان ترقی, romanized: Nardebane Taraghi)
- 1957 – The Happy Naked One (Persian: برهنه خوشحال, romanized: Berahneh Khoshhal), starring with Mohsen Mahdavi
- 1959 – A Girl from Esfahan (Persian: دختری از اصفهان, romanized: Dokhtari az Esfahan), with director George Ovadiah
- 1959 – Two Brides for Three Brothers (Persian: Do Aroos Baraye se Baradar), with director Mohammad Abdi (film director)
- 1961 – What's the Difference (Persian: Ki Be Kiyeh), with director Reza Karimi

=== Singing ===
- 1962 – The Lost Flower (Persian: گل گمشده, romanized: Gole Gomshodeh), featured singing and dancing by Mahvash, with director Abbas Shabaviz

== See also ==
- Iranian dance
- Iranian pop music
- Persian theatre
