= Gholam Hossein Sadighi =

Iranian politician (1905–1991)

- غلامحسین صدیقی
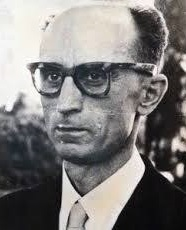

Minister of Interior
- In office 21 July 1952 – 19 August 1953
- Monarch: Mohammad Reza Pahlavi
- Prime Minister: Mohammad Mosaddegh
- Preceded by: Amirteymour Kalali
- Succeeded by: Fazlollah Zahedi

Minister of Post and Telegraph
- In office 6 May 1951 – 16 July 1952
- Prime Minister: Mohammad Mossadegh
- Preceded by: Yousef Moshar
- Succeeded by: Seyfollah Moazzami

Personal details
- Born: Gholam Hossein Sadighi Noori; 3 December 1905 Tehran, Sublime State of Iran
- Died: 28 April 1991 (aged 85) Tehran, Iran
- Resting place: Ibn Babawayh Cemetery
- Party: National Front
- Spouse: Farahangiz Meftah
- Children: two daughters (Afarin and Nikou) and a son (Hossein)
- Profession: Sociologist

Gholam-Hossein Sadighi (Persian: غلامحسین صدیقی; 3 December 1905 – 28 April 1991) was an Iranian politician and Minister of Interior in the government of Prime Minister Mohammad Mosaddegh in 1953. After a CIA-backed coup d'etat overthrew Mossadegh, Sadighi was arrested and later testified in defense of Mossadegh at the latter's trial. Despite the loss of power, Sadighi continued to be politically active. He helped to create the Second National Front in 1960 and, along with other pro-Mossadegh politicians, advocated a democratic system and a Shah that reigns but does not rule.

By 1978, Iran was gripped by mass turmoil and there was a significant danger that Mohammad Reza Pahlavi would be toppled by a mass rebellion led by Ayatollah Ruhollah Khomeini. Because of this threat, the Shah tried to appoint Sadighi as the prime minister in order to rally the moderates behind the government and neutralize the religious opposition. However, the plan collapsed over Sadighi's insistence that the Shah remains in the country and that full executive powers be entrusted in the premier's cabinet, two things that the Shah refused to grant. Because of this, Sadighi left the scene and the Shah instead appointed Shapour Bakhtiar (one of the other leaders of the National Front) as Prime Minister. Sadighi was a patriot who never left Iran and lived in Tehran until his death in April 1991. He is buried in Ibn Babawayh Cemetery in Ray.

== Personal life ==
Sadighi was married to Farahangiz Meftah with whom he had two daughters (Afarin and Nikou Sadighi) and a son (Hossein Sadighi).

== See also ==
- 1953 Iranian coup d'état
- Abadan Crisis
