= Sardar Saker =

Indian film director

Sardar Saker (Persian: سردار ساکر; 1904–1973) was an Indian director who made several films in Iran. He owned his own film studio in Iran, Kuh-e Nur. He introduced Indian-style film narrative elements into Iranian films.

== Filmography ==
- 1964 – A Night in Lalezar Avenue
- 1963 – Game for Anything
- 1962 – The Shore Is Not Far
- 1961 – Ali, the Shoe Shiner
- 1960 – Tomorrow Is Bright
- 1958 – A Ray of Hope
- 1956 – The Sun Shines (Persian: Khorshid Miderakhshad), featuring Mahvash
- 1954 – Morad
