= Ibn Babawayh Cemetery =

Cemetery in Rey, Tehran, Iran

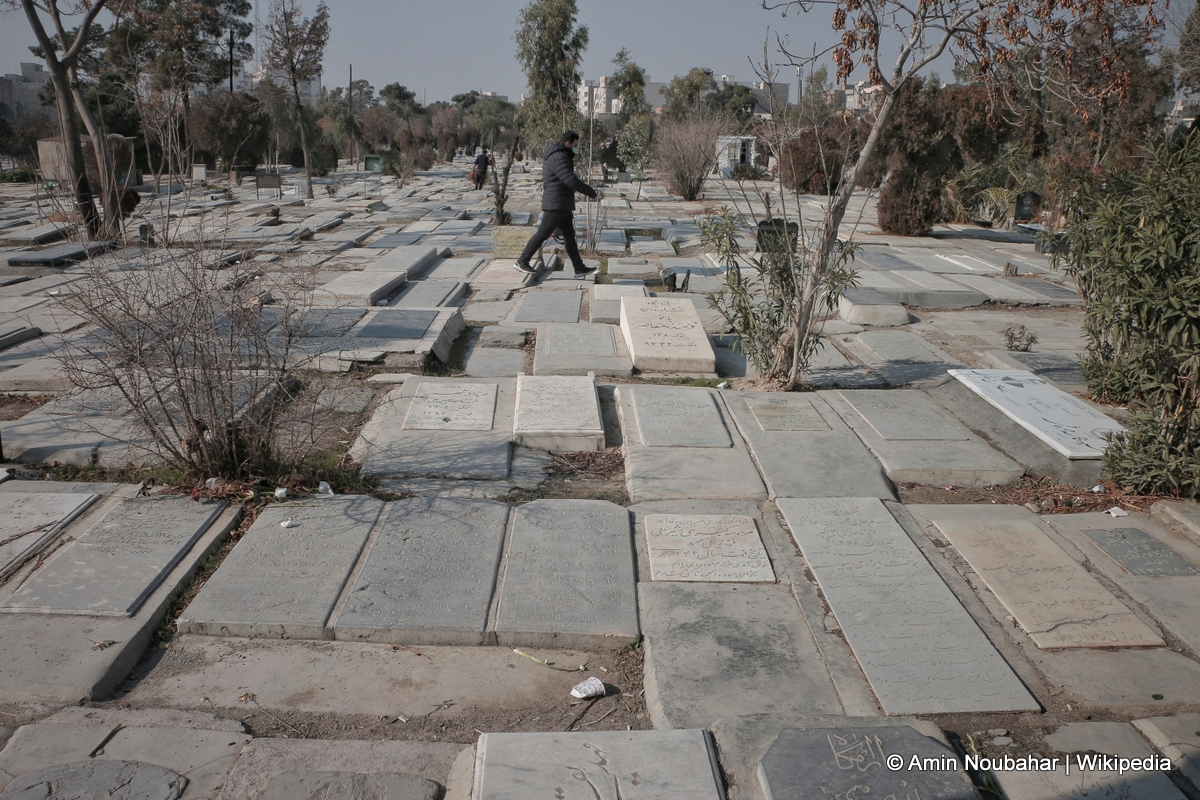
- Interactive map of Ibn Babawayh Cemetery

Details
- Location: Rey, Iran
- Coordinates: 35°36.194′N 51°26.634′E
- Type: Islamic

Ibn Babawayh cemetery (Persian: گورستان ابن‌بابویه or قبرستان ابن‌بابویه), also spelled as Ebn-e Babviyeh, Ebn-e Babooyeh, is located in Iran in the town of Rey (which is now inside Greater Tehran metropolitan area).

== About ==
The cemetery is named after Shia scholar Ibn Babawayh (d.991 CE), one of its most famous occupants. He taught in Baghdad and lived in Rey at the end of his life. His works (more than 300 volumes) are used as valid sources in Jurisprudence. His most famous book is Man La-yahzar al-faqih. He died in 381 A.H. and his tomb is in Ebn-e Babooyeh.

== Notable graves ==
- Ibn Bābawayh (d. 991) – medieval scholar
- Tughril I (993–1063) – founder of the Seljuk Empire (Tughrul Tower)
- Mirzā Abdolbāghi Monajjem-Bāshi (fa) (d. 1859) – politician
- Vahdat Kermānshāhi (fa) (1825–1883) – poet
- Gholāmrezā Esfahāni (1830–1887) – calligrapher
- Mohammad-Rezā Ghomshei (fa) (1817–1888) – cleric
- Abolhassan Jelveh (fa) (1823–1897) – mystic
- Mohammad-Tāher Mirzā (fa) (b. 1835) – Qajar prince and scholar
- Mohammad-Hossein Foroughi Zokā ol-Molk (fa) (1839–1907) – politician
- Mohammad Kermānshāhi (1827/29–1908) – physician
- Yahyā Eskandari (fa) (1879–1909) – politician
- Abolfazl Anghā (fa) (1850–1915) – Sufi leader
- Ali Nouri Hokmi (fa) (d. 1916) – cleric
- Hossein Ardabili (1880–1918) – politician
- Mohammad-Bāgher Khosravi Kermānshāhi (fa) (1849–1919) – writer
- Fazlollāh Āq-Evli (fa) (1886–1920) – Gendermerie officer
- Ali-Mohammad Dowlatābādi (fa) (1868–1923) – politician
- Mirzādeh Eshghi (1894–1924) – journalist
- Fātemeh Ezzat -os-Saltaneh (fa) (1882–1925) – Qajar princess
- Mirzā Taghi Majd ol-Molk (fa) (1861–1926) – politician
- Mohammad-Hossein Gharib Gorgāni (fa) (1843–1926) – cleric
- Ali-Naghi Ganjei (fa) (1872–1929) – politician
- Yahyā Marvasti (fa) (1875–1929) – politician
- Yahyā Kāshāni (fa) (1873–1930) – journalist
- Parvāneh (Batoul Rezāei) (fa) (1910–1933) – singer
- Ashrafeddin Gilāni (1870–1934) – journalist and poet
- Asadollāh Kharaqāni (fa) (1838–1936) – scholar
- Firouz Mirzā Nosrat od-Dowleh III (1889–1937) – politician
- Fathollāh Akbar (1855–1938) – prime minister (1920–21)
- Hādi Tajvidi (fa) (1893–1939) – writer
- Tāher Tonekāboni (fa) (1863–1941) – politician
- Mohammad-Ali Foroughi (1877–1942) – scholar and prime minister (1925–26), (1933–35) and (1941–42)
- Hassan Razzāz (fa) (1878–1942) – wrestler
- Karim Rashti (fa) (d. 1944) – politician
- Fasihozzaman Shirāzi (fa) (1861–1945) – poet
- Hassan Esfandiāri (1867–1945) – speaker of the Majles (1935–43)
- Mozaffar Rezāei (fa) (d. 1946) – gendarmeri general
- Karim Rashti (fa) (1882–1947) – politician
- Fātemeh Sayyāh (1902–1948) – scholar
- Heydar-Ali Kamāli (ru) (1871–1949) – politician
- Sahāmeddin Ghaffāri Zoka od-Dowleh (fa) (1886–1951) – politician
- Abdorrazzāq Boghāyeri (fa) (1869–1953) – scholar
- Hossein Samiei (1876–1953) – politician
- Mehdi Nouri (fa) (d. 1954) – cleric
- Hossein Fātemi (1918–1954) – politician
- Fakhr-ol-Dowleh Qājār (1883–1955) – Qajar princess
- Abdollāh Rāzi (fa) (1894–1955) – writer
- Ali-Akbar Dehkhodā (1879–1956) – journalist and scholar
- Mohammad-Sādegh Koupāl (fa) (1893–1956) – IIAF general
- Ahmad Bahār (1889–1957) – politician
- Roshanak Noedoust (fa) (1898–1957) – journalist
- Mojtabā Dowlatābādi (fa) (1905–1957) – politician
- Mohammad-Ali Eghbāl (fa) (1915–1958) – politician
- Ebrāhim Hakimi (1871–1959) – prime minister (1945–46) and (1947–48)
- Hossein Kouhi Kermāni (fa) (1897–1959) – poet
- Amir Amir-A'lam (fa) (1876–1961) – politician and director of Red Lion and Sun Society
- Rajab-Ali Khayāt (fa) (1883–1961) – mystic
- Mohammad-Hassan Shamshiri (1897–1961) – businessman
- Hādi Ranji Tehrāni (fa) (1907–1961) – poet
- Javad Fāzel Lārijāni (fa) (1916–1961) – writer
- Mahvash (Masumeh Azizi Boroujerdi) (1920–1961) – singer
- Abolhassan Khānali (fa) (1932–1961) – scholar
- Mohammad Shāhbakhti (fa) (1886–1962) – army general
- Mahmoud Mahmoud (1882–1965) – writer
- Parkhideh (Nourolhodā Mozaffari) (fa) (1913–1965) – actor
- Sādegh Amāni (1930–1965) – terrorist
- Mortezā Niknejād (1942–1965) – terrorist
- Mohammad Bokhārāei (1944–1965) – terrorist
- Rezā Saffār-Harandi (1946–1965) – terrorist
- Jabbār Bāghtchebān (1886–1966) – scholar
- Ali Hey'at (fa) (1888–1966) – politician
- Fakhr-Ozmā Arghun (1898–1966) – poet
- Ali-Akbar Bahman (1883–1967) – diplomat
- Hossein Behzād (1894–1968) – painter
- Eynollāh Mahmoudi Hamadāni (fa) (1896–1968) – gendarmeri general
- Gholāmrezā Takhti (1930–1968) – wrestler
- Rokneddin Mokhtāri (1887–1970) – head of National Police and musician
- Abdollāh Moazzami (1909–1971) – politician
- Ahmad Nāzerzādeh Kermāni (fa) (1913–1976) – poet
- Morshed Cheloyi (fa) (d. 1978) – mystic
- Ali-Akbar Derakhshāni (1896–1978) – army general
- Nāsser Moghaddam (1921–1979) – army general and head of SAVAK
- Mohammad-Rezā Āmeli Tehrāni (1927–1979) – politician
- Gholāmhossein Minbāshiān (fa) (1907–1980) – musician
- Asadollāh Rashidiān (1922–1980) – politician
- Sādegh Ghotbzādeh (1936–1982) – politician
- Abdollāh Entezām (1899–1983) – diplomat
- Mohsen Foroughi (1907–1983) – architect
- Mohammad-Ali Riāzi Yazdi (fa) (1911–1984) – poet
- Abolqāsem Pāyandeh (fa) (1911–1984) – writer
- Ali-Gholi Ardalān (1900–1986) – diplomat
- Nourolhodā Mangeneh (1902–1986) – journalist and activist
- Khoshdel Tehrāni (fa) (1914–1986) – poet
- Heydar Raqābi (1933–1987) – poet
- Kāzem Sāmi (1934–1988) – politician
- Abbās Yamini Sharif (fa) (1919–1989) – scholar
- Ali-Akbar Kāveh (fa) (1894–1990) – calligrapher
- Abbāsqoli Golshāyān (fa) (1902–1990) – minister of finance (1948–50)
- Mehdi Khāledi (fa) (1919–1990) – musician
- Hassan Sādāt Naseri (fa) (1925–1990) – scholar
- Gholāmhossein Sadighi (1905–1991) – politician
- [Atāollāh Zāhed (1915–1991) – actor
- Mohammad Mohit Tabātabāei (fa) (1901–1992) – scholar
- Abolghāsem Falsafi (fa) (1906–1992) – cleric
- Ghanbar Rahimi (fa) (1918–1992) – philanthropist
- Abolghāsem Anjavi Shirāzi (fa) (1921–1993) – scholar
- Hādi Eslāmi (fa) (1939–1993) – actor
- Ahmad Hāshemi (fa) (1939–1993) – actor
- Abdollāh Forādi (fa) (1927–1996) – calligrapher
- Mahmoud Halabi (fa) (1900–1998) – cleric
- Ali-Akbar Ghaffāri (fa) (1924–2004) – writer
- Rahim Moazenzādeh Ardabili (1925–2005) – moazzen
- Mehdi Dādpey (fa) (1940–2019) – air force general
- Abodollāh Anvār (fa) (1924–2023) – scholar
- Abdolhossein Raeisosādāt (fa) (1953–2024) – scholar

== Gallery ==
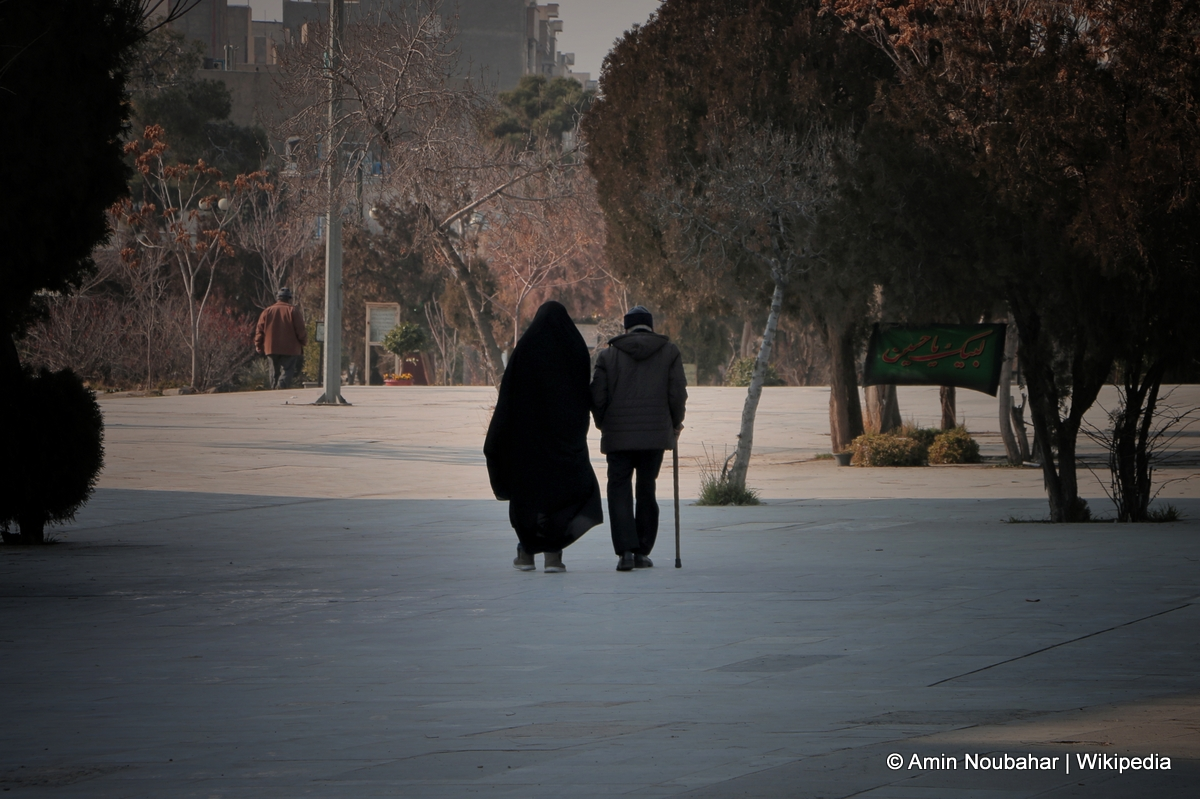

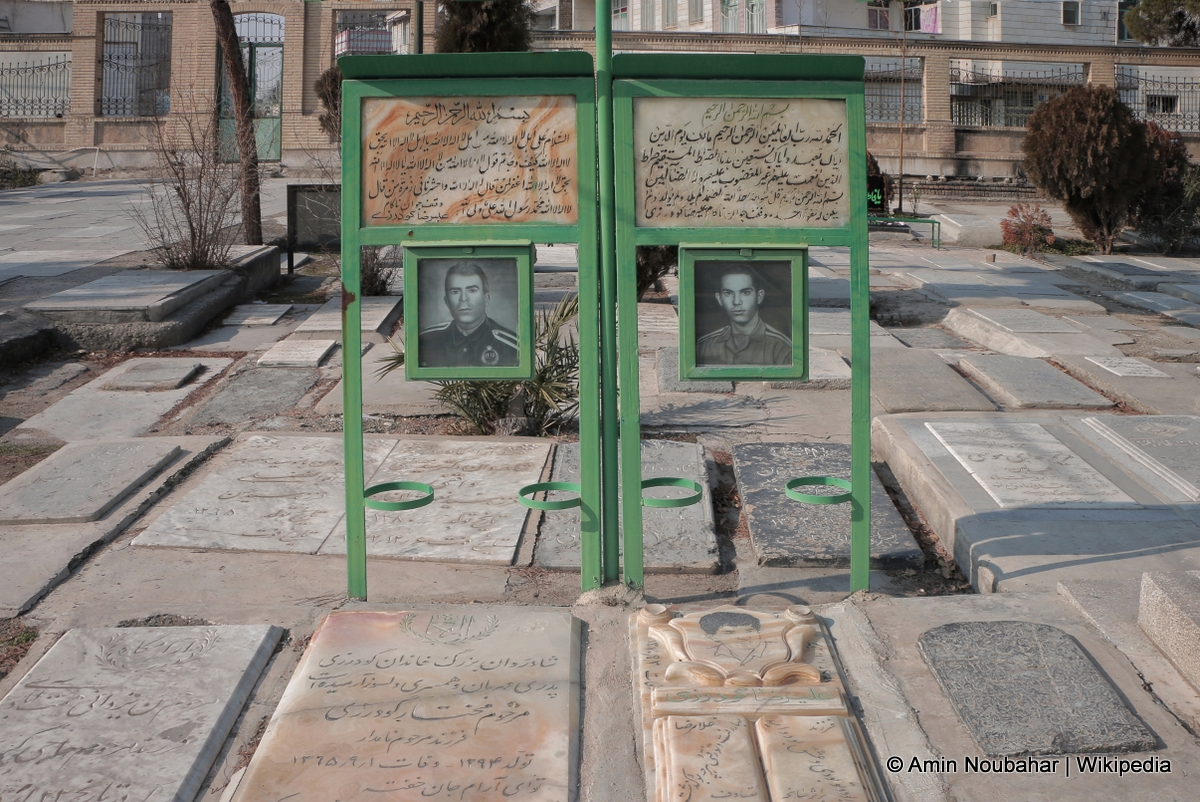

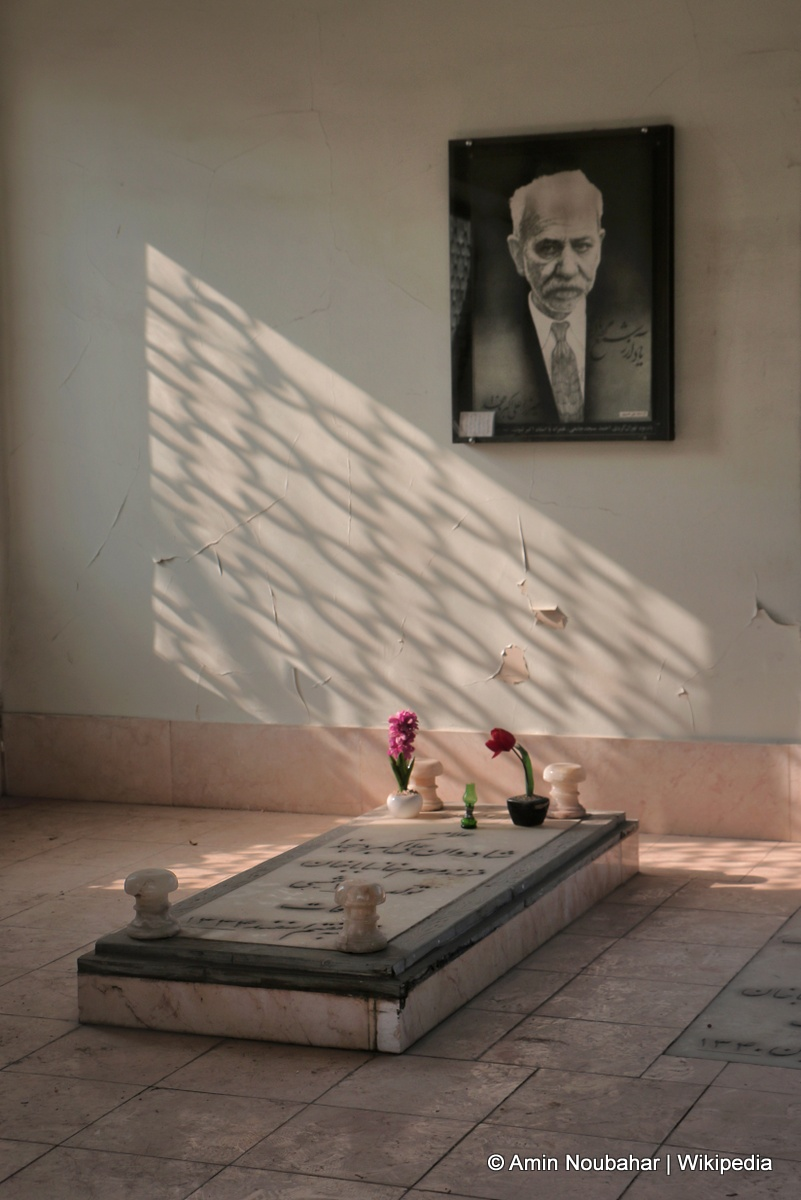
Tomb of Ali-Akbar Dehkhoda

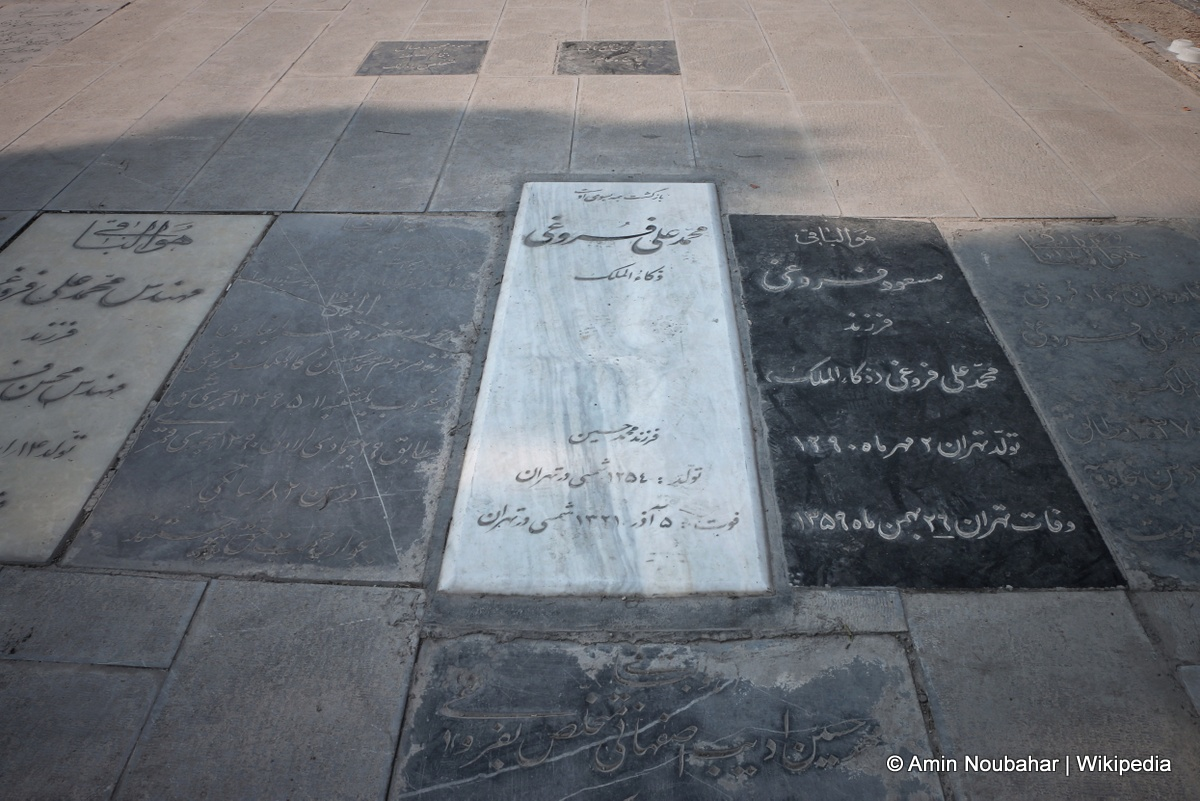
Tomb of Mohammad Ali Foroughi

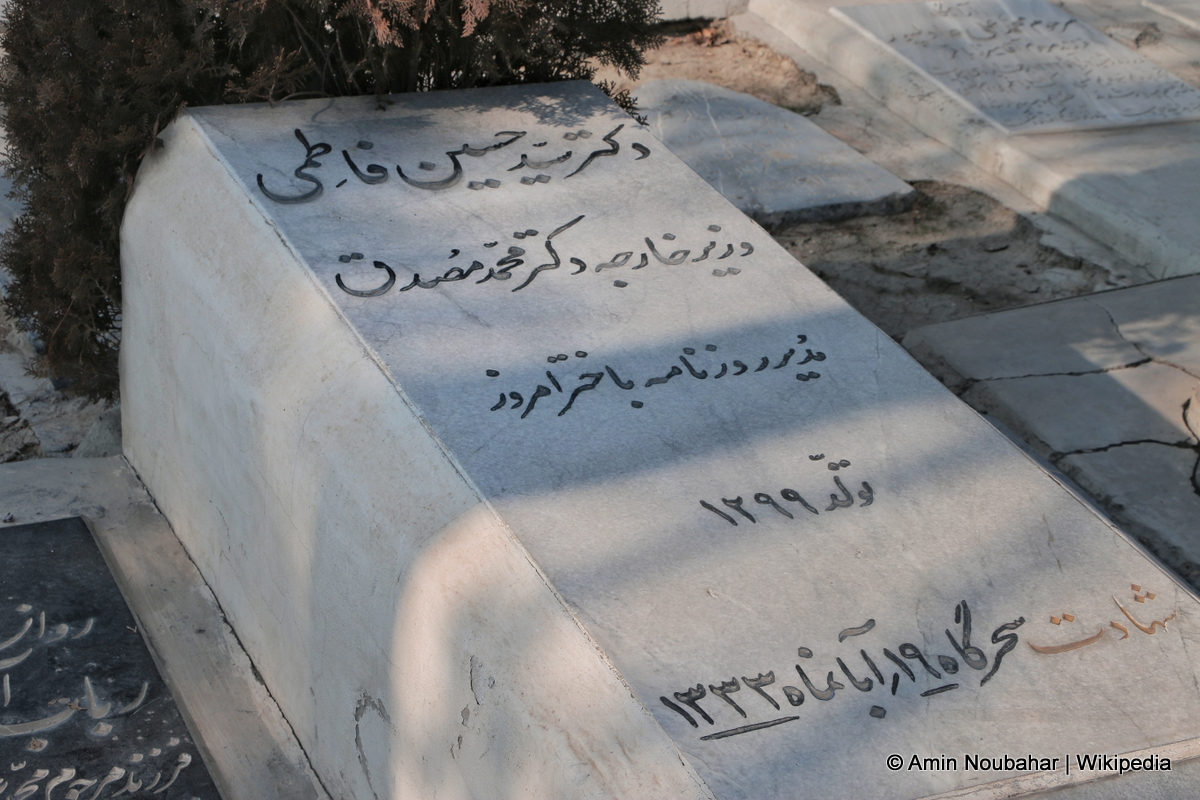
Tomb of Hossein Fatemi

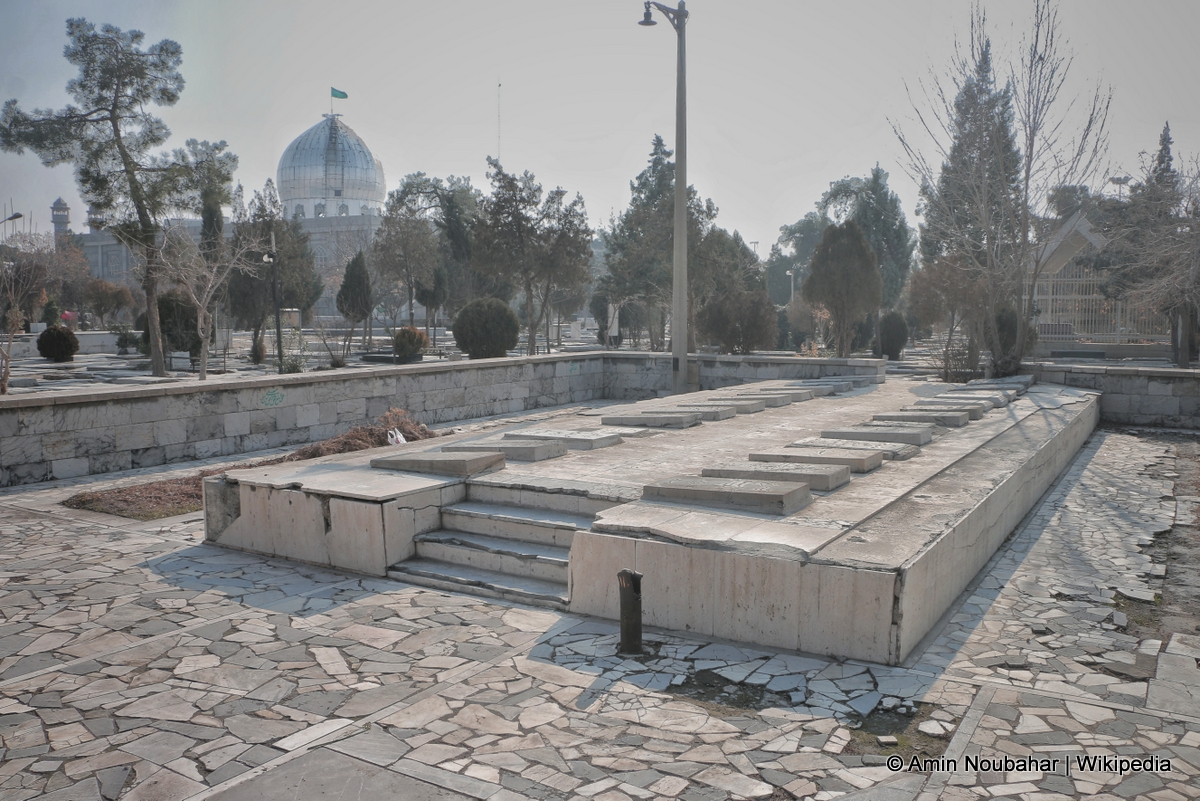
Tombs of 1952 Iranian Uprising victims

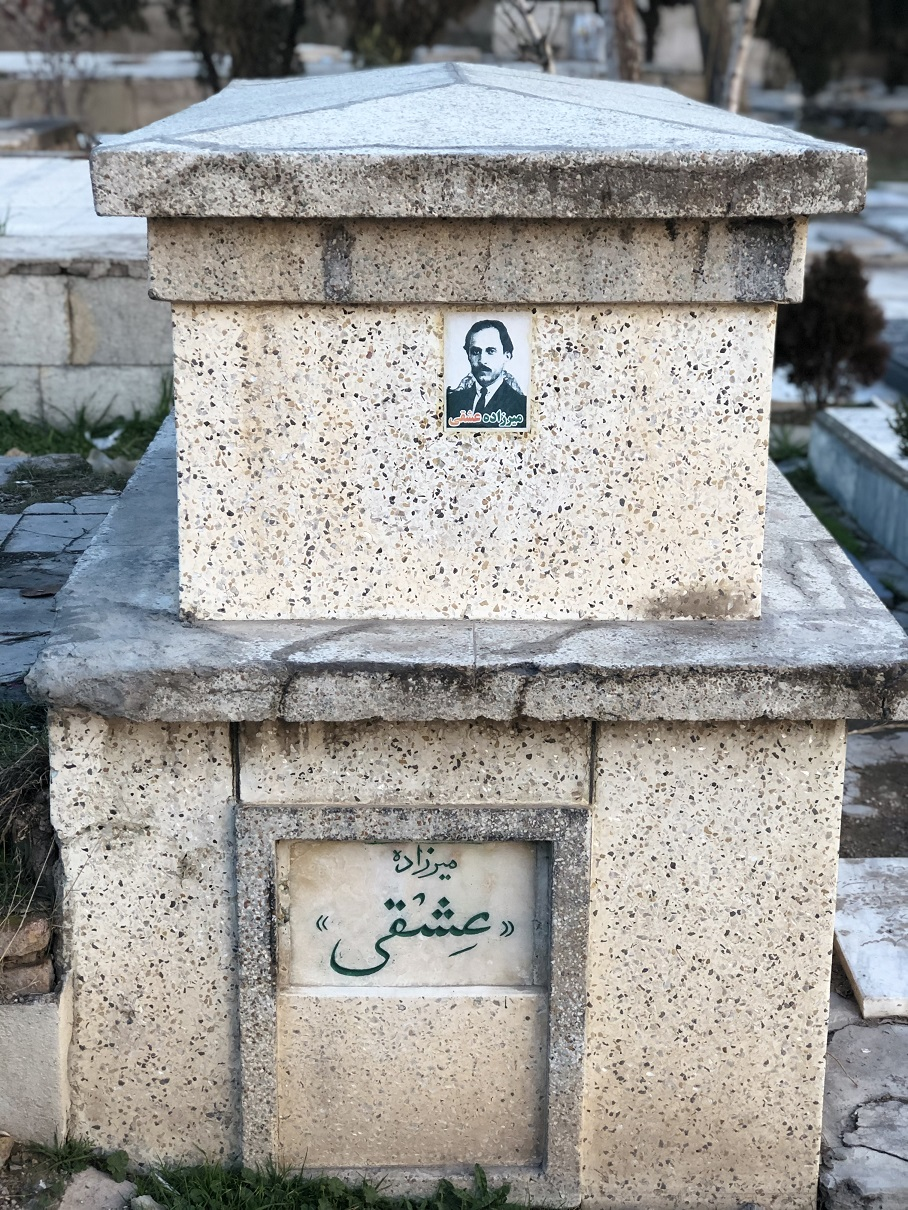
Tomb of Mirzadeh Eshghi

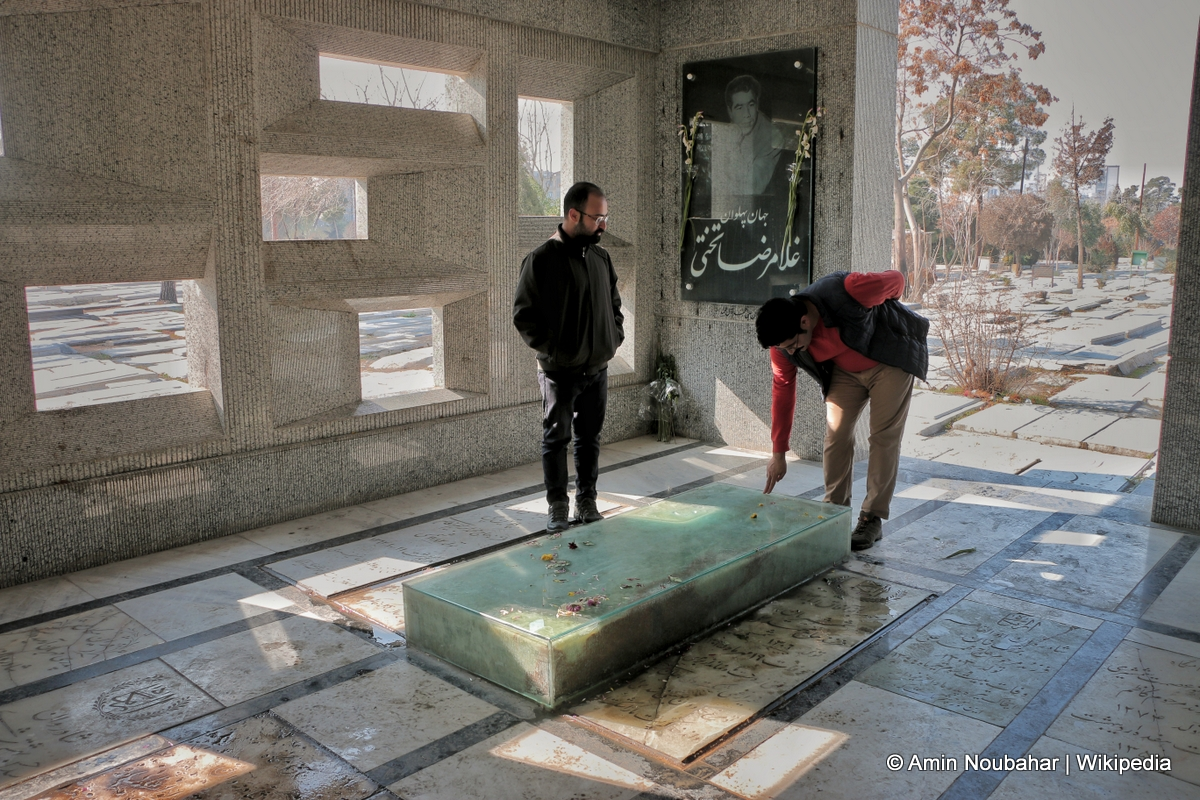
Tomb of Gholamreza Takhti

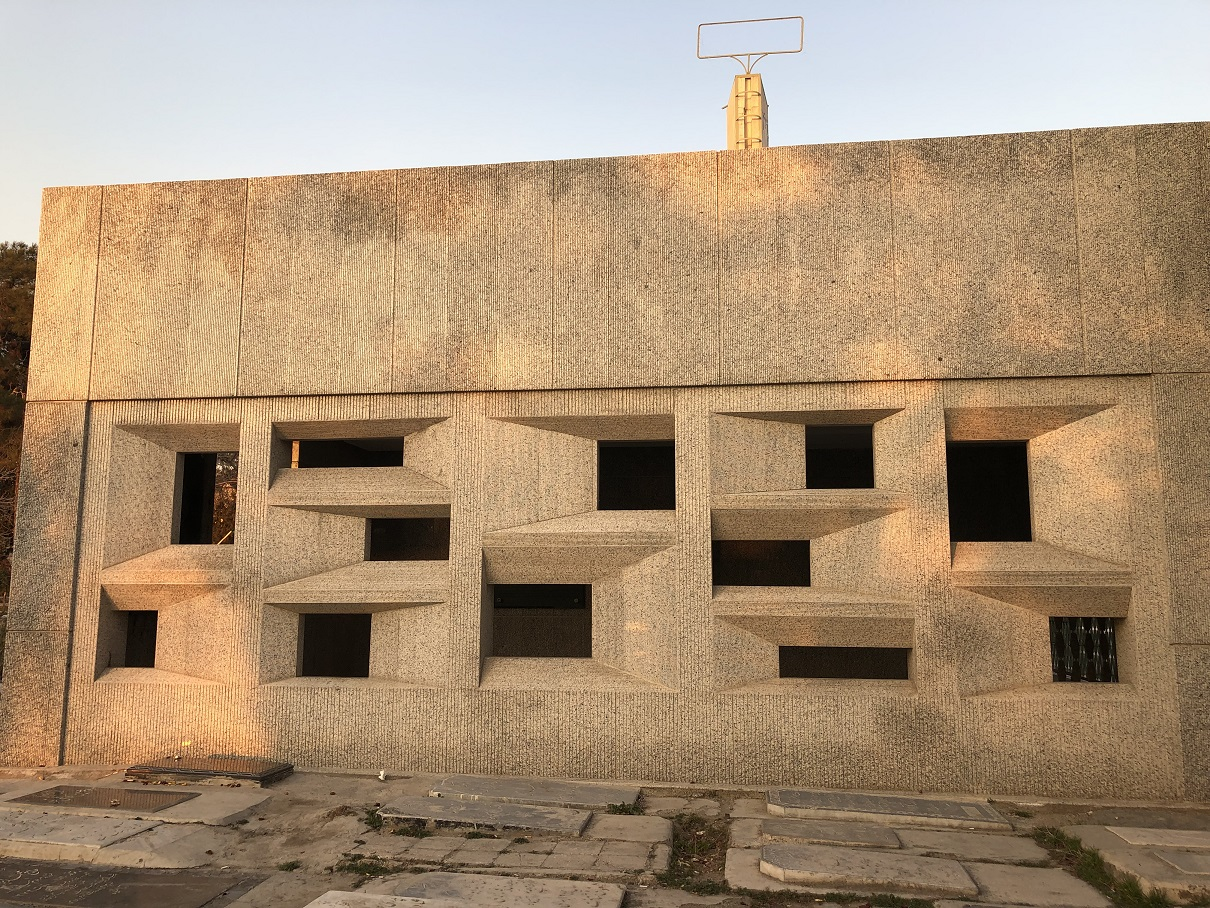
Tomb of Gholamreza Takhti
