= Ali Akbar Derakhshani =

Iranian historical and military figure

Ali Akbar Derakhshani علی‌اکبر درخشانی
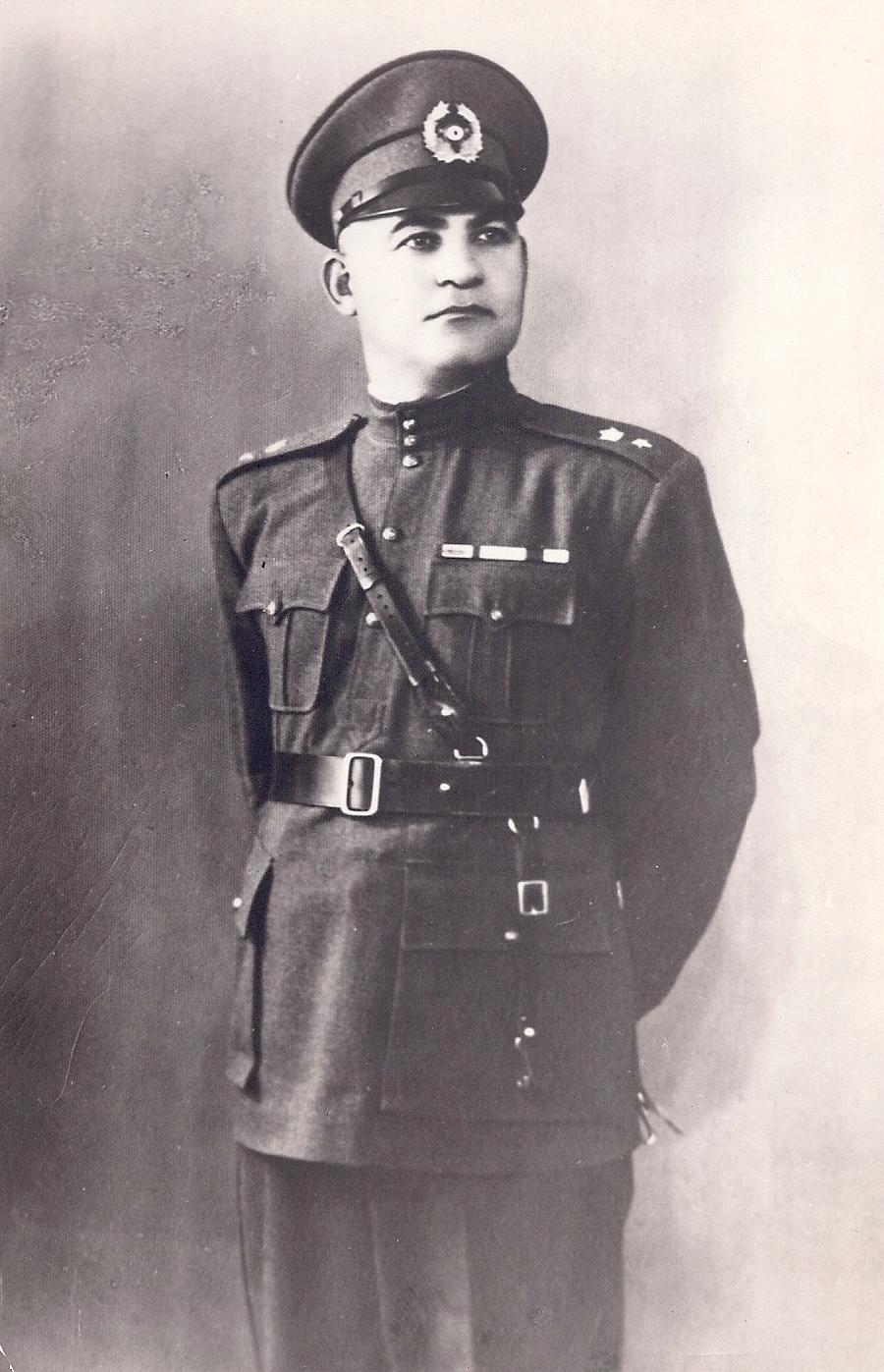
- Born: February 28, 1896
- Died: March 27, 1978 (aged 82); Evin Prison, Tehran
- Burial place: Ibn Babawayh Cemetery, Rey, Iran
- Military career
- Branch: Imperial Army of Iran
- Rank: Brigadier general
- Known for: One of the founders of the New Iranian Army

Ali Akbar Derakhshani (Persian: علی‌اکبر درخشانی; February 28, 1896 – March 27, 1978) was one of the founders of the New Iranian Army. He began his military service during the reign of Ahmad Shah Qajar.

== Early life ==
Ali Akbar was born on February 28, 1896, in Tehran. His family was Azerbaijani and Shiite. His father, Ali Naqi Khan Kangerlu (son of Khan Mohammad Khan), was among the first Iranian officers of the Persian Cossack Brigade. He was born in 1863 in the village of Khaneqah Sorkh near Urmia, and he died in Tehran in 1903, where he was buried in Imamzadeh Masoom fa. Ali Akbar's grandfather, Reza Qolikhan, migrated from the Nakhchivan region to the south of the Aras River in 1828, following the Turkmancha treaty between the governments of Iran and Russia. Many people and tribal leaders unwilling to accept Russian citizenship did the same. Ali Akbar attended high school at the Cossack Brigade military school in Tehran. At the age of 18, he entered the Gendarmerie officer school and was promoted to the rank of first lieutenant. During his service in the gendarmerie, he was assigned to the 6th regiment of Lorestan. After participating in intense fighting to ensure regional order, he was reassigned to Isfahan with the 6th regiment. Later, he joined the National Defense Committee with this regiment in Sultanabad. He participated in the Bid Sorkh (Red Willow) pass battle between the Iranian forces and the Tsarist Russian army and was awarded medals for bravery in battle.

== Cossack Brigade and uniformed troops: Gilan Wars ==
In 1918, he resigned from the Gendarmerie and joined the Cossack army with the rank of second lieutenant. He served in the Cossack Atriyad in Rasht. Displaying great bravery in the wars with Mirza Kuchik Khan, he quickly rose through the ranks, reaching the rank of colonel within five years. At the age of 26 he was appointed as the commander of the Gilan brigade, one of the largest units in Iran's army. During this time, he was directly involved in fierce battles between the Iranian military and the Russian Bolshevik forces, who had invaded Gilan and occupied various areas, including the cities of Rasht, Bandar Anzali, and Astara. Afterward, he became the head of the Mazandaran military. His diary detailing the Gilan wars serves as a valuable source for historians. In these notes, General Derakhshani clearly wrote that while the people of Gilan fully supported Mirza Kuchik Khan against the government forces, they sincerely supported the soldiers of the Iranian government in the war with the Bolsheviks.

== Urmia: Command of the Sepahban Regiment and forces of three provinces ==
On October 21, 1923, Ali Akbar Derakhshani was appointed as the commander of the newly established Sepahban regiment in his father's hometown, Urmia. This regiment had the crucial task of safeguarding the northwestern border areas of the country. Shortly after, he was entrusted with the command of the forces of three provinces - Urumieh, Khoy, and Salmas, which included the Layamout (Deathless) Cavalry Regiment. This marked the beginning of his extensive missions in the western regions of Iran.

The people of Urmia and its surroundings had endured many hardships due to foreign occupation, prolonged bloody clashes among nomadic groups and sectarian conflicts, which resulted in murder, plunder, and insecurity. The city and its neighboring villages were left in semi-ruinous conditions. Two infantry companies and a machine gun company of the Sepahban regiment were housed in dilapidated buildings without basic amenities like toilets, forcing soldiers to relieve themselves in nearby alleys. Derakhshani worked tirelessly to address various shortcomings. Additionally, since other government offices were not fully established yet, he also focused on improving the living conditions of the people.

Within a few months, conditions for the residents began to improve. However, the soldiers' living conditions remained dire, with irregular and delayed delivery of salaries, rations, and clothing. The government lacked the funds to build barracks, leaving only the remnants of Russian barracks which locals had scavenged to repair their own homes. Derakhshani, with the cooperation of local commissions and support from residents, embarked on rebuilding a new barracks on the ruins. Ayatollah Arab Baghi, the religious authority of West Azerbaijan, encouraged the reconstruction effort. Without central government funding, Derakhshani mobilized residents to construct a thirty-meter avenue followed by additional squares and streets.

His other initiatives included establishing a telephone line between Urmia, Salmas, and Khoy, utilizing leftover wires from the Russian army, and recruiting builders and carpenters from Tabriz to expedite city reconstruction efforts.

== Campaign in the West ==
On November 5, 1924, Ali Akbar Derakhshani was appointed to lead the advance forces, composed of the Sepahban regiment and tribal forces, of a 4000-man military expedition to disarm nomads and restore order in the western regions of Iran. He spent twenty months and twenty-two days on this challenging campaign.

Soon he assumed command of the expeditions first column, succeeding Brigadier General Abul Hasan Pourzand. General Ahmad Agha Amir Ahmadi served as the Amir of Lashkar-e-Gharb (commander of the Western Army) during this time. Serious differences arose between Pourzand and Derakhshani regarding the strategy and management of the force from the outset.

The initial campaign objective was to assert control over Gholamreza Khan Abu Qadareh, the governor of Pushtkooh, who had defied central government authority. The campaign successfully did this and also disarmed tribes and nomadic groups in Pushtkooh, Kabirkooh, and other areas of Lorestan, as well as Kurdish regions surrounding Kermanshah, collecting over five thousand rifles from various clans— a significant step towards establishing security in the western region.

The campaign and 20-month march was marked by severe hardships, including hunger, thirst, and extreme weather conditions. Some troops resorted to consuming only dry corn kernels to stave off hunger, resulting in fatalities due to starvation and dehydration. The force lost all its 1000 camels due to lack of fodder and harsh weather, and two hundred horses and mules perished during a short period in the very high temperatures of Mansurabad region. Despite these challenges, the officers and men remained steadfast in their duties, and succeeded in achieving their objectives.

During this period, Derakhshani had only one five-day leave, during which he visited Shiite holy sites Al-Atabat Al-Aliyat in Iraq with permission from Reza Shah, crossing the border without identification and in civilian attire. Upon returning to Urmia (now Rezaieh) in 1926, the Sepahban regiment received a warm welcome from the local population.

During the subsequent four years in Urmia (which was recently renamed to Rezaieh), Derakhshani undertook various construction projects and completed ongoing works, including establishing the Red Lion and Sun Society. With a small symbolic initial funding from Ayatollah Mujtahid Arab Baghi, he established the first Iranian hospital in the region, providing medical care and services previously offered only by American religious missions. The hospital's establishment garnered support from the local populace, prompting increased donations to the Red Lion and Sun Society.

Following the death of the regional brigade commander, Derakhshani assumed command of the brigade while retaining his previous position.

== Lorestan and Ilam ==
On June 30, 1930, during a meeting at Saad Abad Palace, Reza Shah expressed concern over the prolonged unrest in Lorestan, despite 12 years of government military efforts, particularly in the Kabirkooh region, which posed a threat to the connectivity of Khuzestan Province with the rest of the country. He appointed Ali Akbar Derakhshani to resolve the situation swiftly, granting him the authority to receive direct orders from the Shah for crucial matters. Derakhshani assumed the role of military governor of Kabirkooh and Abdanan, replacing Brigadier Mohammad Ali Behzadi.

Despite being placed under the command of the Brigadier General Abul Hasan Pourzand, conflicts between Porzand and Derakhshani persisted, leading to Pourzand's dismissal on August 2 of the same year by the order of Reza Shah. Derakhshani assumed control of the Pushtkooh government while retaining his previous position, effectively taking on the responsibilities of two brigadier generals while still a colonel.

Derakhshani successfully quelled the unrest in Lorestan and persuaded non-compliant tribes in Pushtkooh to submit to the Iranian government. He implemented widespread disarmament, resettled nomadic populations, established comprehensive regulations, government departments, and enforced public conscription laws and other national statutes in the border region.

With Reza Shah's approval, Derakhshani oversaw infrastructure projects connecting the region to other parts of the country, including the construction of the first asphalt road and tunnel. He transformed Hossein Abad, the former center of Pushtkooh governors, into a city renamed Ilam and also renamed Mansourabad as Mehran Both actions were at the suggestion of Derakhshani to Reza Shah which met with the Shah's approval.

Under Derakhshani's leadership, the region also saw significant progress in education, with the opening of several primary schools, the first such schools in the region. The improved security situation prompted the return of many Pushtkoohi immigrant families from Iraq, leading to tensions between Iran and Iraq due to depopulation of eastern Iraqi villages.

Despite his achievements, Derakhshani was eventually relieved of his duties, and Brigadier Porzand was reinstated in his place. Attempts of to prosecute Derakhshani were unsuccessful. His tenure in the Ilam region lasted six years and three months.

== Private royal estates ==
In 1940, Ali Akbar Derakhshani assumed the role of head of Private Royal Estates Inspectorate. However, his tenure was short-lived due to his vocal opposition to the practices of the royal estates, including his objection to forced labor, which he expressed directly to Reza Shah. Consequently, he was dismissed from his position after just two months.

In a letter dated February 16, 1941, Hossein Shokooh, head of Reza Shah's Special Office, conveyed a warning on behalf of the Shah regarding Derakhshani's criticism of forced and unpaid labor within the imperial estates. Derakhshani was instructed to explain his objections and provide his opinion on the perceived harm caused by these practices. Subsequently, he was demoted to head of the inspectorate of the royal properties in Gorgan, Aliabad, and Gonbad-e Kavus, as well as assuming the governorship of Gorgan.

However, Derakhshani's tenure in this new role was also short-lived. In response to a telegram from Reza Shah's Special Office regarding sending wheat from Gorgan to Tehran, Derakhshani stated that the daily bread supply of the people of Gorgan was supplied with difficulty and there was no surplus wheat to send to Tehran. On the very same day he was removed as governor by the Minister of Interior and was also relieved of his duties at the Inspectorate.

As a result of these bold actions, Derakhshani fell out of favor with Reza Shah and was sidelined from any further positions during Reza Shah's remaining rule. Derakhshani's notes provide valuable first-hand historical insights into the functioning of the Royal Estates during this time.

== West Azerbaijan Governorate ==
After more than two years of waiting for service, Ali Akbar Derakhshani was appointed as the deputy commander of the 3rd Azerbaijan Division on June 1, 1943. However, his tenure in this position was brief.

Amid rising insecurity in Rezaieh and the surrounding areas, exacerbated by clashes among clans and the encroachment of Soviet forces, Major General Razm Ara, Chief of Army Staff, deemed the situation disgraceful and politically significant. He selected Derakhshani to address the unrest. Consequently, on July 17 of the same year, Derakhshani was appointed as the commander of the brigade and gendarmerie of West Azerbaijan, as well as the governor of the province.

Derakhshani swiftly restored order in Rezaieh and its vicinity. However, 120 remote villages remained under the control of Kurdish clan leaders due to the previous withdrawal of the gendarmerie and the absence of any government presence. Derakhshani resolved to rectify this by reinstating gendarmerie posts along the Rezaieh-Mahabad road and in surrounding areas. He accompanied the troops in doing so and gradually extended government authority and quelled unrest both by a show of force and through negotiations with the tribes.

In early September, Derakhshani shifted his focus to areas like Khoi and Maku, where looting and violence persisted and had left several gendarmes dead and wounded. After assessing the situation and deploying troops with government, he successfully reestablished order and government authority in these regions.

In October, Derakhshani presented a report to Mohammad Reza Shah at Marmar Palace, where the Shah expressed gratitude for his efforts. On October 26, 1943, Derakhshani was awarded a military medal personally by the Shah and, less than a week later, was promoted to the command of the Azerbaijan military forces in both East and West Azerbaijan provinces, despite still holding the rank of colonel.

== Command of the 3rd Division of Azerbaijan and the Government of Pishevari ==
Upon his appointment as the commander of the 3rd Azerbaijan Division on June 1, 1943, Ali Akbar Derakhshani faced challenges due to the Soviet Army's occupation of Azerbaijan. Soviet troops had forcibly removed the army's previous commander, Brigadier General Khosravani, from Tabriz. Despite encountering verbal abuse and insults to himself and Iranian authorities from Soviet commanders, Derakhshani actively monitored the situation in various cities of Azerbaijan by visiting several towns and barracks, which drew criticism from Soviet generals and the Tudeh Party. For a long time, previous commanders had not set foot outside of Tabriz for fear of upsetting the Soviets. His actions in Azerbaijan led to his promotion to General and he was awarded another top medal, this time of the first rank of the first order.

General Derakhshani's resistance and actions so annoyed regional Soviet political leaders and commanders that on November 23, 1945 the top leader of Soviet Azerbaijan, Mir Jafar Baghirov, and the military commander of the Caucasus region, General Maslennikov, jointly sent a letter addressed to Stalin, Molotov, Beria, and Malenkov, complaining of General Derakhshani by name and stating that his actions could cause serious complications and disruptions in Soviet plans.

In December 1945, Soviet forces surrounded the Tabriz barracks, restricting the movement of Iranian army personnel. Not even one Iranian truck was allowed by the Soviets to leave the Tabriz barracks. Amid conflicting and impractical orders from the army headquarters, the army found itself unable to resist effectively. Chief of Staff Major General Arfa's last order instructed the Division commander to resist the uprising and, if resistance proved impossible, to relocate to Tehran. The determination was to be made by the council of the officers of the Tabriz barracks

On December 13, 1945, upon the approval of the council of officers and following the occupation of Tabriz by Soviet and Democratic Party forces, the Tabriz barracks laid down its arms. After the last of the officers had arrived in Tehran, General Derakhshani left Tabriz and returned to the capital. Upon his arrival, he was arrested and subjected to interrogation, leading to a prolonged investigation and trial that culminated in a ruling by the Court of Appeal on March 11, 1948.

== Military court and conviction ==
Ali Akbar Derakhshani's trial was presided over by Major General Abul Hasan Pourzand initially, and later by Major General Mahmoud Khosropanah fa. The appeal court was headed by Major General Iraj Matbouie fa. The military prosecution was initially led by Brigadier General Amir Nezami, succeeded by Brigadier General Abdul Ali Etemad Mogghadam, although Colonel Hossein Azmoudah practically handled all the prosecution.

The selection of court officials was influenced by various factors. Major General Pourzand, known for his longstanding animosity towards Derakhshani dating back to the Lorestan wars, openly expressed bias against him. Despite being expected to remain neutral, Pourzand engaged in polemics against Derakhshani even before his appointment as head of the court. Major General Khosropanah, appointed after Pourzand's death, was close to Major General Arfa, adding to concerns about impartiality of the court.

Major General Matbouie, appointed head of the second court, had a controversial past, having commanded the Mashhad army during the Goharshad mosque uprising, leading to his subsequent execution after the Revolution of 1979. He was also severely criticized for his actions during the occupation of Azerbaijan in 1941 and for abandoning his post as the commander of the military there.

Colonel Azmoudeh, despite lacking legal expertise, was appointed as deputy prosecutor due to his trustworthiness to Arfa and his associates. He later gained notoriety for his role in trials and executions following the 1953 coup against Prime Minister Mossadegh, earning nicknames like "Eichmann" and "Dracula of Iran."

Despite efforts to convict Derakhshani for political reasons, he was acquitted of charges related to surrendering weapons and provisions and refusing to resist the Democratic Sect. The government's policy, clearly articulated by Prime Minister Ebrahim Hakimi and Minister of War Major General Ali Riazi fa in Parliament, was refrain from bloodshed in Azerbaijan and avoidance of confrontation the Soviet-backed uprising while the Soviet army was still in the province.

Despite being found guilty on only two charges, i.e. entering into a contract with Pishevari and continuing command, the legal validity of these convictions was widely questioned. The alleged contract was never presented in court and the original has not been seen to this day, and the charge of continuing command was retroactively applied after General Derakhshani was already under arrest for several weeks.

Ultimately, Derakhshani was sentenced to life imprisonment by the trial court, later reduced to 15 years on appeal. He served two years and ten months before being released. The idea that he capitulated to the Democratic Sect is erroneous, given the acquittals on four charges and questionable convictions on two charges in his case.

== Arrest by SAVAK and death ==
In the twilight of Mohammad Reza Shah's reign, Ali Akbar Derakhshani was known as an opponent of the regime and was closely monitored by the authorities. On the night of March 27, 1978, SAVAK agents raided his home, alleging espionage for the Soviet Union, although the veracity of these charges remains questionable. He subsequently died in Evin Prison. The cause of death was given as myocardial infarction.

The circumstances surrounding Derakhshani's arrest and death, coupled with conflicting reports, cast doubt on the accusations leveled against him by SAVAK. At eighty-two years old and with failing eyesight, Derakhshani had been a vocal critic of the government for many years. Despite enduring imprisonment and being sidelined from positions of power for over three decades after leaving the army, he remained under surveillance by SAVAK. Given his physical limitations and social isolation, he was unlikely to have been a viable intelligence asset for the Soviet Union.

Derakhshani's public opposition to the government made him a convenient target for security agencies' propaganda. His arrest coincided with the Iranian revolution's critical juncture, as the regime sought to suppress dissent and warn of foreign powers interfering in Iran's affairs to instigate unrest. However, the timing of his arrest, following the Tabriz uprising and amidst preparations for demonstrations commemorating the event, raises suspicions about the government's motives.

During the eighteen days of government propaganda surrounding Derakhshani's arrest, details provided by the government controlled broadcast and print media were inconsistent and sensationalized, including allegations of receiving a pension from the Soviet Union and confessing under interrogation. The shifting narrative, from his arrest in the street to inside his home, reflects the propaganda's chaotic nature. Subsequent investigations revealed that Derakhshani had died shortly after his arrest, casting doubt on the authenticity of the interrogation narrative altogether.

Moreover, SAVAK failed to provide legal evidence to judicial authorities regarding the grounds for Derakhshani's arrest and death, leaving the accusations vague and dubious. Despite his burial in the family mausoleum in Ibn Babuyeh Cemetery in Ray, the circumstances of his arrest and death remain shrouded in uncertainty.

Derakhshani's memoirs, published posthumously in Iran and the United States, offer insights into his life and opposition to the regime, contributing to a more nuanced understanding of his legacy.
