= Mohammad-Hassan Shamshiri =

- Born: 1897
- Died: 4 October 1961 (aged 63–64)
- Resting place: Ibn Babawayh Cemetery
- Occupation: Restaurateur
- Political party: National Front

Mohammad-Hassan Shamshiri (Persian: محمدحسن شمشیری), more known as Haj Hassan Shamshiri, was an Iranian bazaari restaurateur, philanthropist and civic patriotic activist.

Shamshiri was among leading members of the Chelow kabab guild and a patron of the National Front and its affiliated parties.

He purchased a substantional amount of the bonds issued by Governments of Mohammad Mosaddegh to support his cause. After the 1953 Iranian coup d'état, he continued his financial contributions and grassroots supports to the nationalist 'National Resistance Movement (NRM)', and was subsequently banished to an island in the Persian Gulf by the post-coup government.
