= Jafar Shahidi =

Iranian scholar (1919–2008)

Seyed Jafar Shahidi Persian: سید جعفر شهیدی
- Born: 21 March 1919; Borujerd, Qajar Iran
- Died: 13 January 2008 (aged 88); Tehran, Iran
- Education: University of Tehran
- Occupations: Distinguished professor and scholar of Persian Literature and Islamic history and theology, President and Editor-in-Chief of Dehkhoda Dictionary Institute, Founder of the International Center for Persian Studies
- Children: Dr. Hossein Shahidi (d. 2014), Dr. Hassan Shahidi, Dr. Mohsen Shahidi, Dr. Shokoufeh Shahidi, Ehsan Shahidi (d.-)

Jafar Shahidi known as Seyed Jafar Shahidi (Persian: سید جعفر شهیدی; 21 March 1919, in Borujerd – 13 January 2008, in Tehran) was a distinguished scholar of the Persian language and literature, and a renowned historian of Islam. Born in Boroujerd, Lorestan province, Iran, Shahidi dedicated his life to Persian studies, acting as the director of the Dehkhoda Dictionary Institute and International Center for Persian Studies, serving as the Dean of the Faculty of Literature and Humanities at the University of Tehran, and mastering the fields of jurisprudence and Islamic history. As a member of the Faculty of Literature and Humanities at the University of Tehran, Shahidi specialized in the study of Persian language and literature as well as Islamic theology, jurisprudence, and history.

Shahidi was a prominent disciple of Ali Akbar Dehkhoda and Badiozzaman Forouzanfar. He served as a seminary in Qom and Najaf under notable figures such as Tabatabaei, Seyed Hossein Boroujerdi, S. Khoi A., under whom he attained his degree in ijtihad. He is most notable for his works on the Dehkhoda Encyclopedic Dictionary of the Persian language and his research in Islamic history and religion.

In his later years, he served as the President of the Dehkhoda Institute and founder of the International Center for Persian Studies.

== Life and legacy ==
Seyed Jafar Shahidi was born in the town of Boroujerd, Lorestan province, Iran. His father, Mohammad Sajjadi was a leading Iranian scholar who died shortly after the birth of his son. Spending the first few years of his education in his hometown, Shahidi continued his academics in the capital city of Tehran.

In 1941, he moved to the town of Najaf, Iraq to pursue his studies in the field of Islamic jurisprudence and successfully surpassed the highest levels of education to receive the title of mujtahid. From there onward, Shahidi moved to Qom, Iran, where he was mentored by the leading scholars, most notably Ayatollah Boroujerdi. Falling ill, Shahidi resorted to the translation of Arabic in Iran alongside Doctor Sanjabi (the then Minister of Culture). He later received an offer to teach at the Abu Muslem School.

Encounters with Dr. Mohammad Moin permitted his close relationship with Ali Akbar Dehkhoda who later entrusted Shahidi as the director of the Dehkhoda Institute. In a letter to the then Minister of Culture, Ali-Akbar Dehkhoda wrote, "Shahidi is rare in his abilities as a scholar," noting that he wished to limit his hours at the institute from twenty-two to eight in order for Shahidi to be able to continue his teachings as well.

Dr. Shahidi played a pivotal role in the formation and compilation of the second largest Persian lexicon, known as the Moin Dictionary, was entrusted with the completion and publishing of the text upon Dr. Mohammad Moin's death in 1971.

In 1991, Shahidi donated his residential house to the Narmak Municipality of Tehran where it remains today as the Dr. Shahidi Public Library.

== Positions ==
- 1968: Associate Director of the Dehkhoda Dictionary Institute
- 1971–2007: President and Editor-in-Chief of the Dehkhoda Dictionary Institute
- 1989: Founder of the International Center for Persian Studies
- 1971: Co-Editor of the Moin Dictionary

== Awards ==
- Honorary professorship from the University of Peking
- Distinguished professor of The University of Tehran.
- The first class science insignia from the president of Iran
- First Rank Medal - Eminent Researcher of Tehran University.
- Member of Chehrehaye mandegar

== See also ==
- Iranian studies
- Academy of Persian Language and Literature
- Seyed Karim Amiri Firuzkuhi
- Amir Banoo Karimi

== Notes ==
- http://www.payvand.com/news/08/jan/1303.html
