= Mirza Ali-Akbar Sabir =

Azerbaijani poet (1862–1911)

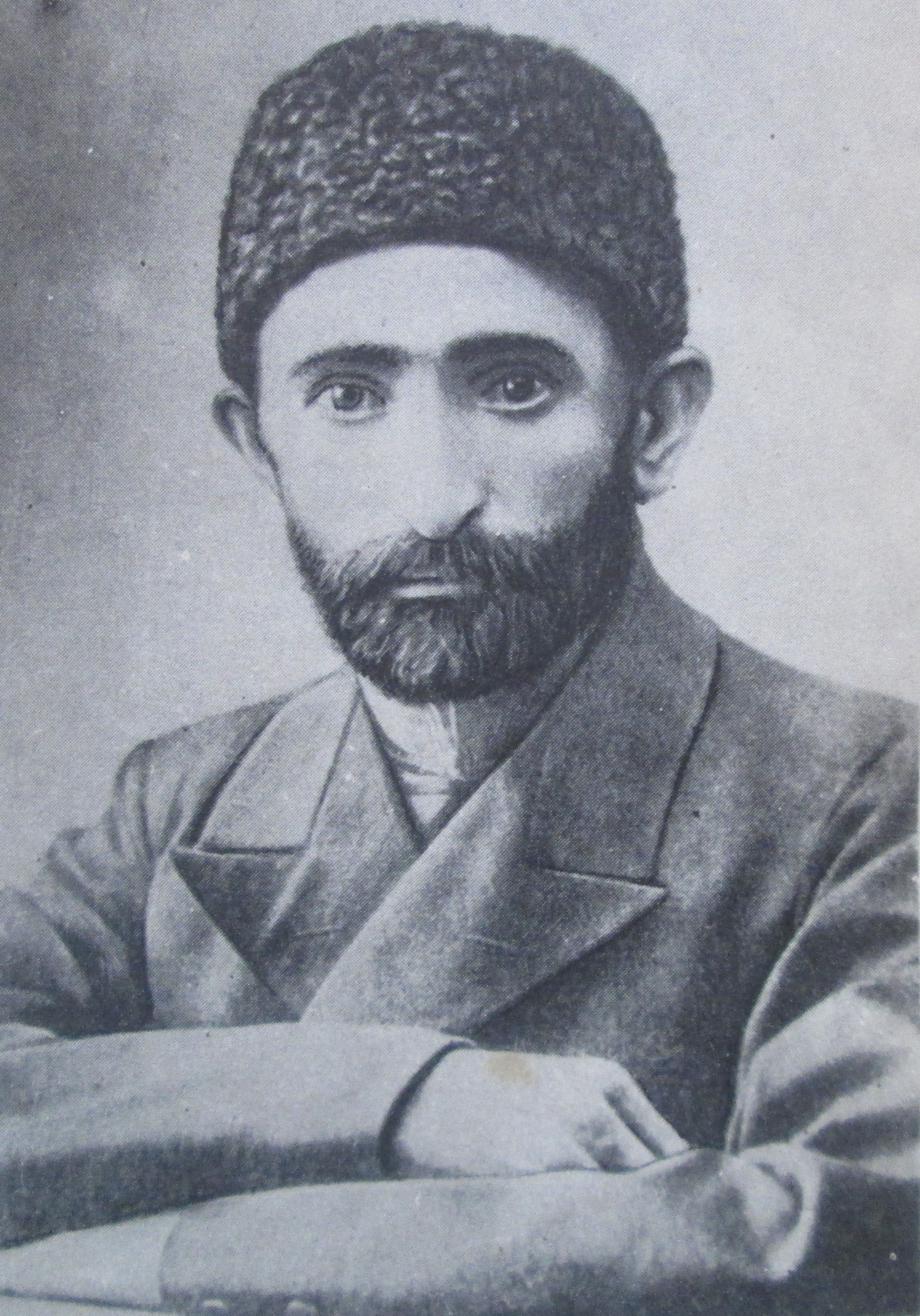
- Portrait of Mirza Ali-Akbar Sabir
- Born: 30 May 1862; Shamakhi, Russian Empire
- Died: 12 July 1911 (aged 49); Baku, Russian Empire
- Occupations: Satirist and poet
- Writing career
- Pen name: Sabir, Hophop, etc
- Language: Azerbaijani; Persian
- Subjects: Religion, politics, etc

Mirza Ali-Akbar Tahirzada (Azerbaijani: میرزا علی اکبر صابر: 30 May 1862 – 12 July 1911), commonly known by his pseudonym Sabir (صابر), was a satirist and poet in the Russian Empire, who played a leading role in development of Azerbaijani literature.

A native of the city of Shamakhi, he grew up in a religious, middle-class household that opposed modern education. During his adolescence, he became a pupil of the distinguished poet Seyid Azim Shirvani, who established a modern institution where various subjects were taught. With Seyid Azim Shirvani's support, Sabir began translating Persian poetry and writing his own Azerbaijani poetry. Although his father initially wanted him to work in the family grocery store, he eventually accepted Sabir's literary ambitions after the latter's strong opposition, including a failed attempt to flee to Mashhad. While still only known within Shamakhi, Sabir's first published poem appeared in the Tbilisi newspaper Sharq-e Rus in 1903. By 1909, he was writing for the satirical magazine Molla Nasraddin. His works covered a wide range of topics, including political satire and social commentary, often criticizing corrupt officials and religious hypocrisy. Sabir's innovative use of Azerbaijani set his poetry apart from traditional forms. He spent his last years in Baku, where he died in 1911.

== Biography ==
Sabir's birth name was Mirza Ali-Akbar Tahirzada. He was born on 30 May 1862 in the city of Shamakhi, then ruled by the Russian Empire. At the time, it was the largest city in the Shirvan region. Like the majority of Muslims in the South Caucasus, Sabir's native tongue was Turkic and he was an adherent of Shia Islam. He grew up in a religious, middle-class household where they did not seem to want to give him a modern education. During the start of his adolescence, he became a pupil of the distinguished poet Seyid Azim Shirvani, who had established a modern institution where Arabic, Persian, Azerbaijani Turkic, Russian and other topics were taught. Sabir started translating Persian poetry and writing Azerbaijani poetry with the support of Seyid Azim Shirvani.

Sabir's father wanted him to work in the family's grocery store, thinking that the few years he had spent in school would be enough. However, he eventually allowed Sabir to continue his literary research, due to the latter's strong opposition, including an attempt to flee to Mashhad by a caravan. Sabir established close relationships with Shirvan's literary figures, and inspired by Persian poets, especially Nizami Ganjavi, he composed numerous ghazals in their style. In 1885, he travelled to several cities in Iran and Central Asia, thus expanding his intellectual knowledge and later inspired to write about the locals there. Following his return home, he married and became the father of eight daughters and one son.

Due to his large family, Sabir was forced to work a lot. He made soap for fifteen years, during which time he would joke "I make soap to wash away the external dirt of my countrymen." He attempted to establish a school in the European tradition, but failed. He also received numerous anonymous and hostile letters as a result of his criticism of conservatism. It was reportedly the journalist Hasem Beik Vezirov who sent him some of these letters. In the journal Sada, Sabir replied to him: "I am a poet, the mirror of my age/ in me everyone sees his own face/ As it happened yesterday, ‘a person’ looked at me /Seeing none other than himself in the mirror."

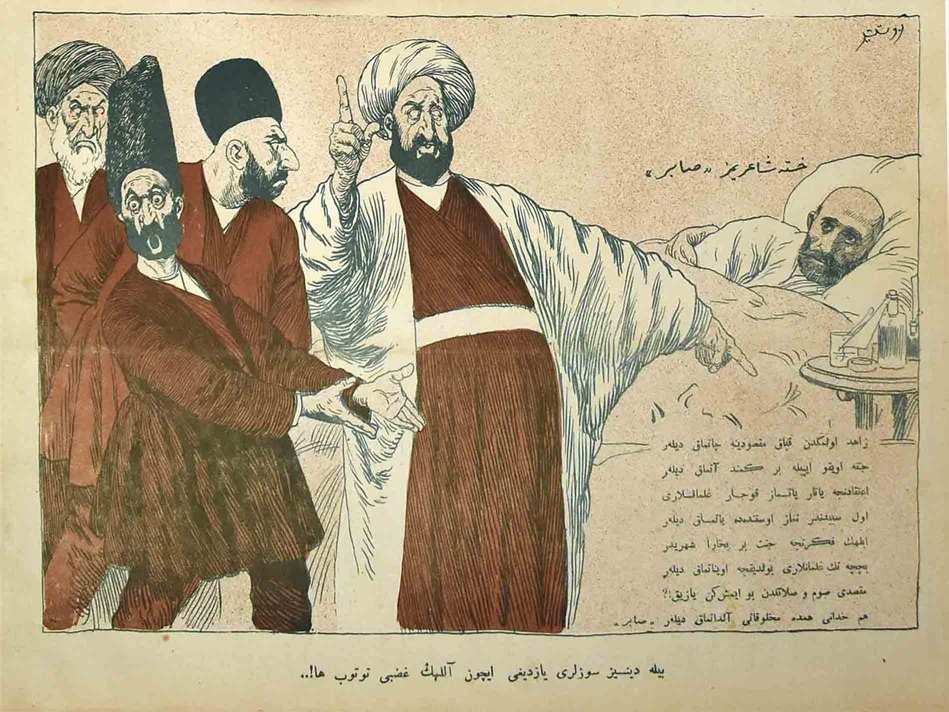
Depiction of Mirza Ali-Akbar Sabir in an issue of Molla Nasraddin, with the headline "Our sick poet Sabir. God is angry with him for writing such irreligious words." Dated 29 May 1911

While still only known within Shamakhi, Sabir's first published poem appeared in the Tbilisi newspaper Sharq-e Rus in 1903. In 1909, he became a writer of Molla Nasraddin satirical magazine, which was also based in Tbilisi. During a time where classical Persian poetry was favored by the elite and writers, Molla Nasraddin used the everyday language of the Turks of the South Caucasus, a practice which was also taking place in other satirical journals. With an extensive readership spanning the Volga region, Siberia, Anatolia, Iran, and South and Central Asia, Molla Nasraddin had the largest audience of all the Muslim publications of the Russian Revolution of 1905. This was largely due to the abundance of political cartoons that were even understandable to the uneducated.

Sabir used many pseudonyms, but was commonly known as Sabir ("patient") and Hophop ("hoopoe"). Sabir and the editor of Molla Nasraddin, Jalil Mammadguluzadeh, were well-known proponents of using Turkic in literature. Sabir also published for numerous other journals, including Hayat, Fuyuzat, Rahbar, Dabestan, Olfat, Ershad, Haqiqat, Yeni Haqiqat and Ma'lumat. Due to his work, Sabir faced widespread opposition both within and beyond Shirvan. Both he and Molla Nasreddin were labeled as heretical by some of the mullahs in Tabriz. Due to the escalation of the opposition against him, he dedicated a poem to the inhabitants of Shirvan, in which he defended his beliefs:

I am a Shi'ite, but not in the ways you desire
I am a Sunni, but not like the examples you like. I am a Sufi, but not like the ones you describe. I am a lover of truth, O people of Shirvan.

Due to the opposition, Sabir moved to Baku, a more modern and international city, where he worked as a teacher in 1910. Nearly all of his short satirical pieces, known as Taziyanaler ("The Whips") were written there. He later had a liver condition, which led to a brief return in Shamakhi for treatment, while his poems were being published by Molla Naṣreddin and Gunesh. He died on 12 July 1911 in Baku.

== Work ==
Sabir was known for his use of various poetic forms, such as qasida, ghazal, mathnawi, ruba'i, and bahr-e tavil. He sometimes engaged with well-known poems by taking their first line and adding his own twist, thus creating a reinterpretation of the original work. Several portions of the Persian epic Shahnameh by Ferdowsi were translated into Azerbaijani verse by Sabir, such as the story of Siyavash.

A vast range of topics are covered in Sabir's satirical works, from moments in social and personal life at home to the Japanese victory against the Russians. His work included a significant amount of political satire, with subjects ranging from the Iranian shah Mohammad Ali Shah Qajar to the German Emperor Wilhelm II, and from the Ottoman sultan Abdul Hamid II to unintelligent mullahs and corrupt low-ranking officials. He frequently criticized religious hypocrisy, and satirized chauvinistic males and superstitious, naive women. Sabir also wrote in other genres than satire, such as in 1905, when he wrote the formal poem "To our Muslim and Armenian Compatriots" for Hayat. The purpose of this poem was to remind community leaders of their responsibility to educate people and avoid misinformation, while also urging cooperation among activists from multiple communities:

Müslimanla ermänilär beyninä düshdü fäsad,
Yokhmu bir sahib-hidayät, yokhmu bir ähl-i räshad?!
Ey sükhän-danan, bu günlär bir hidayät väqtidir!
Ülfät-ü ünsiyyätä dair khitabät väqtidir!

Translation:

Discord has fallen between the Muslims and Armenians,
Is there no one to offer guidance, no one possessing the right path?!
You who know discourse: these days, it’s time for some guidance!
It’s time for sermons on friendship and fellowship!

The poem uses a straightforward language, but not informal. The tone is relatively professional and official, such as the use of the Persian phrase "ähl-i räshad". "Some verses and phrases that disregard the Turkish language" were corrected by a Hayat copy editor, though it is unknown if these were Persian or informal terms.

In the Fuyuzat, a mystical ode to "The Word" ("Söz") is made by Sabir. The final couplet connects his pen name with the journal's title, appealing to "The Word":

Vijdan-ü dil-i Sabirä näshr eylä füyuzin,
Ta kim, bitä könlündä räyahin-i kämalat

Translation:

Imprint your graces [füyuz] on Sabir’s heart and conscience
So that in his heart, the fragrant herbs of perfection might grow

His use of Persian grammatical forms ("ta kim") and classical tropes ("the fragrant herbs of perfection") characterize his Persianate phrasing in this passage. Sabir had no difficulty in writing in an elegant and complex style, but for sarcastic lyrics, he favored a different approach. Such a skill was common among journalists and activists who were not recognized for their Persianate poetry.

== Legacy and assessment ==
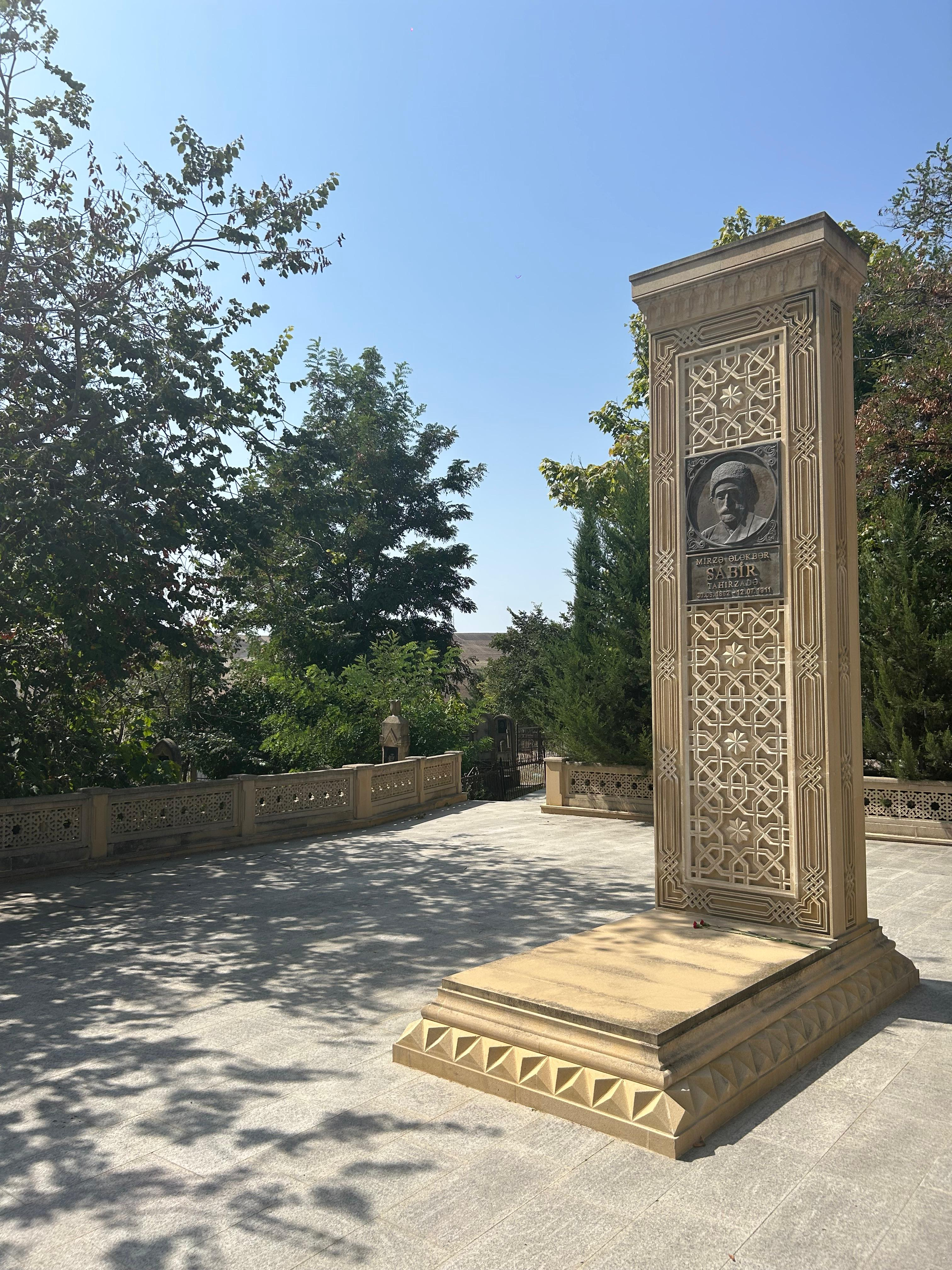
The grave of Mirza Ali-Akbar Sabir

According to the modern Iranian historian Hasan Javadi; "In the art of poetic satire Sabir surpasses all others in Azerbaijani literature." As noted by Sabir's friend and writer Abbas Sahhat, Azerbaijani literature was remodelled by Sabir. After him, very few people desired to return to the traditional form of Azerbaijani poetry because of the stark contrast he made between that and its modern variant. In addition to using new themes and topics, Sabir also used new, poetic language that worked together with the topics he wrote about. Contrary to previous poets, he wrote in poetry an informal, witty, and energetic form. The distinguished Iranian lexicographer and satirist Ali-Akbar Dehkhoda wrote that "Sabir was a great innovator in Azerbaijani literature. He was a child of one night who traveled the way of one hundred years, and surpassed the thoughts and the writers of his age by centuries. He was incomparable in depicting political and social problems."

During the Iranian Constitutional Revolution of 1905–1911, in the defensive lines of Tabriz, the Constitutionalists chanted Sabir's political satire. His writings were openly translated or modified by the Iranian poet and journalist Ashraf Gilani for his newspaper Nasim-e-Shomal. In a letter dated 17 June 1954, the Iranian-Soviet poet Abolqasem Lahouti wrote to Sabir's biographer Mir Ahmadov the following: "Sabir’s poetry is so simple, fluent, intelligent, brave and well-liked by people and so imbued with a courageous spirit that it leaves a great impression on the minds of people desiring freedom." Lahouti continued by saying that Sabir was a major influence on not just him but also the majority of this generation of Iranian satirists.

Compared to the European avant-garde and its small circle of Turco-Persian followers, Sabir's poetry had a bigger influence on poetic innovation across the Muslim communities of South Caucasus, Iran, and Central Asia.

== Sources ==
- Bosworth, Clifford Edmund (2020). "Šervān". Encyclopaedia Iranica Online. Brill. doi:10.1163/2330-4804_EIRO_COM_10804.
- Hodgkin, Samuel (2023). Persianate Verse and the Poetics of Eastern Internationalism. Cambridge University Press. ISBN 978-1009411639.
- Javadi, Hasan (2020). "Ṣāber". Encyclopaedia Iranica Online. Brill. doi:10.1163/2330-4804_EIRO_COM_1088.
- Rezvani, Babak (2015). Conflict and Peace in Central Eurasia. International Comparative Social Studies. Vol. 31. Brill Publishers. ISBN 978-90-04-27636-9.
