= Abdorrahim Jafari =

Iranian publisher (1919–2015)

- عبدالرحیم جعفری
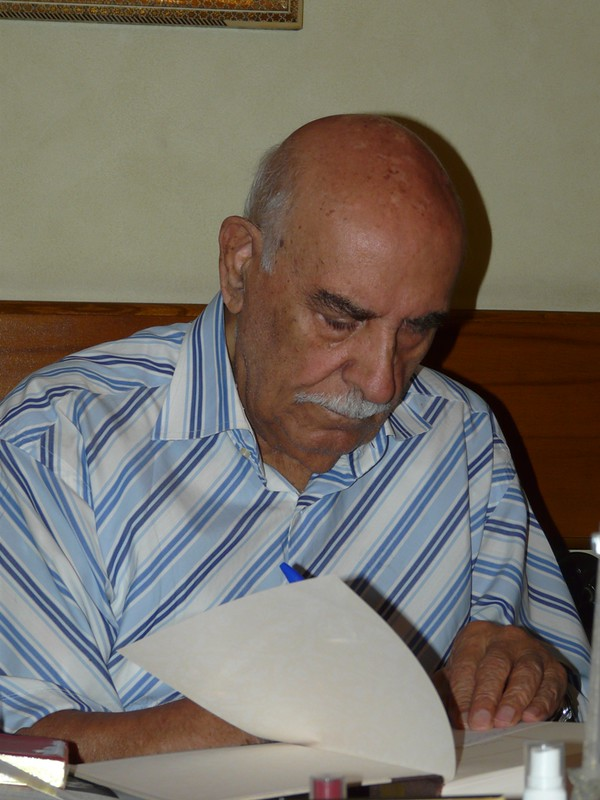
- Abdorrahim Jafari
- Born: 3 November 1919; Tehran, Sublime State of Iran
- Died: 3 October 2015 (aged 95); Tehran, Islamic Republic of Iran
- Occupation: Publisher
- Known for: Founder of Amir Kabir Publishers

Abdorrahim Jafari (Persian: عبدالرحیم جعفری; 1919–2015) was an Iranian publisher who founded Amir Kabir Publishers which by the 1960s would become the largest publishing firm in the Middle East.

== Early life and career ==
Jafari was born in Tehran on 3 November 1919. His father, a peddlar, deserted his mother soon after his birth and his mother brought him up as a single mother who supported her family by working as a weaver.

At the age of twelve, after just five years of elementary school, he began his first job, as "a janitor and messenger boy in a print shop". Having gradually learned how to operate the printing press, he was appointed as foreman. Conditions were hard in the workplace with long hours and delays in being paid.

He married Seddiga Elmi, the daughter of his employer. During World War II, he served for two years as a conscript.

After the war and a bout of typhoid fever he found that he had lost his job in the printing firm. This forced him to launch into business for himself, first as a grocer and then in the book trade. Having no capital he rented a small space in front of Tehran's central mosque where he would offer for sale a small display of books on assignment. After a few months he moved to a small room in Nasser Khosro (Naser Khosrow) Street in the heart of the city's Grand Bazaar district where he began publishing books.

== Amir Kabir Publishers ==
In 1949 he launched the firm Amir Kabir Publishers. Before this Persian publishing had been divided between publishers of religious texts and popular folk tales sold to the lower classes and with low production values and low prices, and, on the other hand, a few publishers issuing small runs of books of "artistic and scholarly merit" for the urban elite and the educated classes centred around the University of Tehran. Jafari planned that his publishing firm, Amir Kabir Publishers, would fill the gap between those two groups of publishers by issuing "religious books and modern literary and historical masterpieces" for Persia's "growing middle classes and to cater to its intellectual needs".

Amir Kabir became the most important publisher of scholarly works in Iran, "particularly of those dealing with Iran's rich literary heritage", including in the mid-1950s the collected works of Sadegh Hedayat which made the firm a household name in the country. The firm also published "reference books, dictionaries and encyclopedias". These included the Moin Encyclopedic Dictionary, a six volume lexicon compiled over ten years by its editor Mohammad Moin and of which Jafari reminisced "when I embarked on the publication it was with the wish that we could have a dictionary in Iran resembling Webster's and Larousse". Other notable publications included a luxury edition of the Shahnameh (1971) featuring "calligraphy, miniatures, and ink drawings" by well-known Iranian artists. In addition, the firm published a series of titles based on the French Que sais-je? series and, beginning in 1954, a budget series of literary works, under the title of Šāhkārhā-ye adabiyāt-e fārsi (Masterpieces of Persian Literature).

As part of his promotion of books, Jafari operated a book club, opened a bookshop with thirteen branches throughout Tehran, and held his own book exhibition.

Within twenty years of its founding Amir Kabir Publishers was the "biggest publishing house in the Middle East" and at the end of three decades it had published "over 2,000 titles (2,700 titles counting those of the merged publishers)".

== 1979 Revolution ==
After the 1979 Iranian Revolution Jafari was arrested and jailed for eight months. His publishing firm was "confiscated by court order and transferred to Sāzemān-e Tabliḡāt-e Eslāmi (the Organization for the Promotion of Islam)".

== Last years ==
In later years Jafari sued the government to get his assets back. However, the courts ruled against him. He lived his final years in "forced retirement" while continuing his fight to gain repossession of Amir Kabir. In 2003–2007, he published an autobiography and In Search of Illumination, a video documentary was produced based on that work.

He died on 3 October 2015 at the age of 98 in a Tehran hospital and buried in the Behesht-e Zahra cemetery.

== Legacy ==
The Iranian filmmaker Mehrdad Sheikhan has argued that Jafari's "efforts, not just as a publisher, but also as a social pioneer, were to provide some space for authors and newcomer writers, poets, translators, artists and even editors, so they could create new and distinguished works". Some of the new writers published and championed by Jafari included Forugh Farrokhzad, Simin Behbahani, Rahi Mo'ayyeri and Mina Assadi. During the 1960s and 1970s, his publishing firm "used books as a means and played a vital role in enlightening the Iranian society".

The innovative cultural vision of Jafari would live on as other Iranian publishers and publishing houses would be inspired by his publishing achievements, including Nashre No, which was founded by his son Reza Jafari.

== Further reading and viewing ==
=== Books ===
- Abdurrahim J'afari, در جستجوی صبح - عبدالرحیم جعفری (Dar Jostojouy-e Sobh / Dar justujūy-i ṣubḥ) (English, "In search of dawn"), Tehran: روزبهان،, (Ruzbihan / Roozbehan), 2003-2007, 2 volumes. - Jafari's autobiography
- Abbas Milani, ed., "Abdurrahim J'afari" (article), in: Eminent Persians : The Men and Women Who Made Modern Iran, 1941-1979: In Two Volumes, Syracuse, NY: Syracuse University Press; New York, NY: Persian World Press, 2008, Vol. 2, pp. 627-631 - also: references to the article

=== Video documentary ===
- In Search of Illumination - documentary trailer
- In Search of Illumination, imdb.com.
- In Search of Illumination, mehrdadsheikhan.com.
