= House-Museum of Mirza Alakbar Sabir =

Museum in Shamakhi, Azerbaijan

- Azerbaijani: Mirzə Ələkbər Sabirin ev muzeyi
- Location within Azerbaijan
- Established: 1962; 64 years ago
- Location: Shamakhi, Azerbaijan
- Coordinates: 40.628294°N 48.641078°E

The house-museum of Mirza Alakbar Sabir (Azerbaijani: Mirzə Ələkbər Sabirin ev-muzeyi) is a memorial museum dedicated to the Azerbaijani satirical poet, public figure, philosopher and teacher, Mirza Alakbar Sabir. The museum is located in Shamakhi.

== History ==
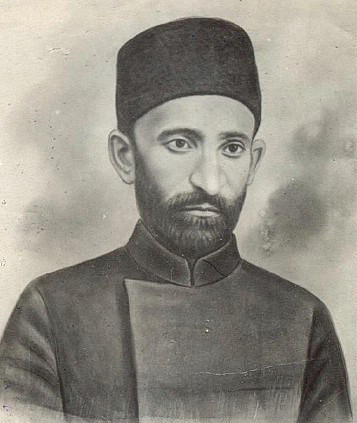
Mirza Alakbar Sabir

The museum was established in 1962, in connection with the 100th anniversary of birth of the poet. The museum is located in a two-storeyed building. The former building of the museum consisted of one floor and 2 exposition halls. The museum was in an emergency condition. It was demolished and rebuilt in 1978. Following the reconstruction, it was reopened 1979 as a museum for public. In September, 2017, the museum was closed and disassembled for restoration, because of wreck of a wall of the museum.

== Exhibition ==
Total area of the museum is 293 m^{2}. The museum consists of six exhibition halls, a balcony. In the first exposition hall exhibits of childhood M.A.Sabir, his school years, exhibits of his travels, and a model of his pot he used to cook soap are displayed. In other rooms household items belonging to the XIX-XX centuries, gifts donated to the museum, photos of Sabir's contemporaries, works of researchers, examples of Molla Nasraddin magazine and other exhibits are exhibited to the audience.
