= Seyed Karim Amiri Firuzkuhi =

Iranian poet 1910–1984

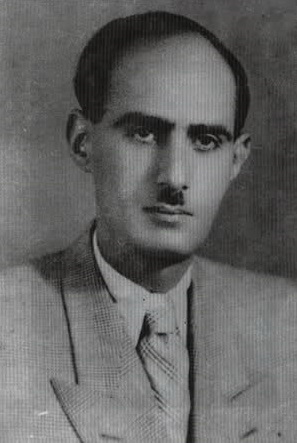
- Born: 1910; Farahabad, Firuzkuh, Sublime State of Iran
- Died: 10 October 1984 (aged 73–74); Tehran, Iran
- Resting place: Shah Abdol-Azim shrine
- Occupations: Belletrist and poet with the nom de plume of "Amir"
- Spouse: Tadj ol-Molouk Dargahi
- Children: Amir Banoo, Shahla, Anoosheh, Mostafa
- Relatives: Ali Mosaffa (grandson)

Seyed Karim Amiri Firuzkuhi (Persian: سید کریم امیری فیروزکوهی; 1910–1984), with the nom de plume, "Amir", was an Iranian poet.

== Life ==
The son of Sayyid Mustafa Quli Muntazam od-Dowleh, Amiri Firuzkuhi was born in Farahabad, Firuzkuh.

His ancestors had been governors and military commanders from the reign of Karim Khan Zand to the end of the Qajar era. His father was a modernist under Mozaffar ad-Din Shah Qajar and accompanied him to Europe as a commander and dignitary.

At the age of seven, Karim's father took him to Tehran, and died shortly after. His grandfather, Amir Muhammad Husayn Khan Sardar, became Karim's guardian. Amir Muhammad Husayn Khan Sardar is historically noted for receiving the Legion of Honour from France for his translation and implementation of the Belgian military doctrine in Iran as well as the successful siege of Herat in the course of a campaign. He is also the founder of the orphanage school in Tehran, now known as the Firuzkuhi Elementary School, which utilized resources from the Firuzkuh landholdings to privately fund a vocational school for young boys and orphans.

Karim received his primary education in Tehran at the Siruz, Servat, Alliance, and Sultani schools, going on to study logic, theology, and philosophy at the American College in Tehran under the tutelage of teachers such as Aqa 'Abd al-Nabi Kajuri and Aqa sayyid Husayn Mujtahid Kashani.

Karim later pursued private study in the circles of learned scholars such as Vahid Dastgirdi, the director of the Armaghan journal and the president of the Hakim Nizami Literary Society, with whom he studied subjects such as the principles of philosophy, rhetoric, and belles-lettres.

At the age of 28, Karim turned to the traditional sciences, studying six years with Shaykh 'Abd al-Nabi Kujuri, Sayyid Husayn Kashani, Sayyad Kazim 'Assar, Mirza Khalil Kamara'i, and Sayyid Mahmud Imam'i Jum'a with whom he studied Arabic literature, logic, theology, Islamic jurisprudence and the principles of Shi'ite doctrine, and mastered the writing and prose and the composition of poetry in Arabic.

Karim came to head the Documents Registration and Real Estate Administration from 1947 to 1957 but resigned from government service altogether to pursue freelance writing.

His contributions are not limited to the Literary Society of Iran, the Hakim Nizami Literary Society, and the Farhangistan Literary Society.

Amiri Firuzkuhi is associated with scholars, writers, and poets in the likes of Rahi Mo'ayyeri, Bahmanyar, Muhammad 'Ali Bamdad, Vahid Dastgirdi, and Sadegh Hedayat as well as with musicians like Habib Sama'i, Abu al-Hasan Saba, and 'Abd al-Husayn Shahnazi.

== Work ==
Amiri Firuzkuhi began composing ghazals at the age of twelve. When he discovered Saib Tabrizi he was captivated by his style and, as a result, became a distinguished adherent of the Indian genre of Persian poetry though his ghazals.

His expression in ghazals are straightforward, clear, smooth, and thematic. In his qasidas his rhetoric is reminiscent of Khaqani's lucidity and eloquence, and his poetic nostalgia that of Mas'ud Sa'd. In his qasida composition he intertwines a legacy of the Khurasan genre with developments of the restoration in such a way, bringing grace to qasidas that are predominantly melancholic.

In the eulogy of Islam and the ahl-i bayt the Prophet and his immediate family his idiom is measured, intermixed with Qur'anic terminology, while in his informal poetry, the tone is gentle and passionate, and in his elegies, the tone is intimate and melancholic.

His qit'as stylistically follow on the model of his qasidas, compared with the latter, these verse fragments tend to be apothegms in a more abstruse and archaic style.

He chooses mathnavi [rhyming couplet genre] to set the mood with an expression reminiscent of Nizami. His poetry runs to 3,000 couplets, in the composition of which he exercises the utmost precision and through a diversity of rhymes crafted in a multiplicity of couplets, he provides inventive imagery stemming from the interaction of his thoughts and feelings.

He was acquainted with the subtleties of Persian poetry, which he applied to his compositions in the Indian genre in such forms as ghazal and qasida. He also had a thorough knowledge of Arabic, in which he composed poetry as well.

== Legacy ==
Amiri Firuzkuhi died in Tehran and is buried in the courtyard of Shah Abdol-Azim Shrine. The majority of his poetic work was composed after he turned fifty. He was celebrated in literary societies throughout Iran, whom he had worked with actively.

His admiration for Saib Tabrizi is not only reflected in his poetry but also in his critical edition of that poet's work which he penned in a detailed introduction. Amiri Firuzkuhi was at odds with the conventional terming of the Saib style as Indian insisting that it was in a separate 'Isfihani' genre.

Apart from his work in ghazal and qasida, he is noted for composing poetry in the form of tarkib-band In contrast to his ghazals, Amiri tended to compose his qasidas in the Khurasani genre, following the precedents of Khaqani, Nasir Khusraw, Mas'ud Sa'd and Anvari.

His poetry is filled with the bemoaning of life with its evanescence and vicissitudes, along with his own personal lack of fulfillment, his lyrically expressed pain and frustration.

Amiri Firuzkuhi's home in Tehran was known as a haven where people like 'Abd al-Rahman Parsa Tuysirkani, Ahmad Mahdavi Damghani, Habib Yaghma'i, Ghulam Husayn Ra'di Adarkhshi, and prominent musicians gathered in an atmosphere for the discussion of poetry, belles-lettres, and art.

Being independently able to live off the proceeds of his inherited lands in Firuzkuh, he could spare his sensitive nature from the burden of the duties of professional involvement with the government. After his death, his daughter, Amir Banoo Karimi, published his divan of ghazals in two volumes.

Amiri's works include translations of texts of the Nahj al-Balagha and Hajj Shaykh Muhaddis Qummi's Nafs al-Mahmum: Wajiza fi 'ilm al-Nabi a philosophical treatise published in the Javidan-i Khirad journal. Other works include two volumes of his own divan, a critical edition of Saib Tabrizi's divan along with an introduction, a Ihqaq al-Haqq in support of the poets of the Safavid era.

== See also ==
- Rahi Mo'ayyeri
- Amir Banoo Karimi
- Ali Mosaffa
- Jafar Shahidi
