= Golsar =

Golsar may refer to:

- Golsar, Savojbolagh, a city in Savojbolagh County, Alborz province, Iran
- Golsar, Gilan, a suburb of Rasht in Gilan province, Iran
- Golsar Rural District, an administrative division of Khansar County, Isfahan province, Iran

== See also ==
- Golsara
