= Dehkhoda Dictionary =

Encyclopedic dictionary of the Persian language

Dehkhoda Persian Dictionary
- Dehkhoda Dictionary is the largest lexical compilation of the Persian language.
- Author: Ali Akbar Dehkhoda (et al.)
- Country: Iran
- Language: Persian
- Published: 1931 (first edition)
- Website: https://icps.ut.ac.ir/fa/dictionary

The Dehkhoda Dictionary or Dehkhoda Lexicon (Persian: لغت‌نامهٔ دهخدا or واژه‌نامه) is the largest comprehensive Persian encyclopedic dictionary ever published, comprising 200 volumes. It is published by the Tehran University Press (UTP) under the supervision of the Dehkhoda Dictionary Institute. It was first published in 1931. It traces the historical development of the Persian language, providing a comprehensive resource to scholars and academic researchers, as well as describing usage in its many variations throughout the world.

The complete work is an ongoing effort that has taken over forty-five years of effort by Ali-Akbar Dehkhoda and a cadre of other experts. Although Dehkhoda covers a big part of literary terms and words in Persian, the first edition of it lacks most scientific and technology terms coined by the Academy of Persian Language and Literature during the past decades. However the newer editions cover them. Dehkhoda states in the preface of the first edition of the dictionary that "Not only does this book miss 2/3 of today’s entire Persian vocabulary, at least half of the words I knew were forgotten and not recorded in this book." Many of those words were added in newer editions published after his death. The newer editions have been published yearly by the University of Tehran.

The original series initially consisted of 3 million records (Persian: برگه, bargeh, lit. 'note slips') (up to 100 records for each word or proper noun) until Dehkhoda's death and currently contains 500,000 entries that according to the latest digital release of the dictionary by Tehran University Press (version 3.0) are based on an ever-growing library of over 2300 volumes in lexicology and various other scientific fields.

It was first printed in 1931. Dehkhoda was also helped by prominent linguists Mohammad Moin, Ja'far Shahidi, and Mohammad Dabirsiyaghi.

The work became so significant that in 1945, a bill was proposed in the Majles, signed by numerous members of the Iranian Parliament, including Mohammed Mossadegh, to allocate a special budget and staff to completing the project. Offices were provided for the task inside the compounds of the Majles itself, and later on, the entire project was moved to University of Tehran College of Humanities, with additional staffing, where the Dehkhoda Institute was founded, and where it remains until this day.

== See also ==
- Ali-Akbar Dehkhoda
- Jafar Shahidi
- Persian literature
- Ehsan Yarshater
- Mohammad Moin
- Soleiman Haim
- Abdolhossein Zarrinkoub
- Mohammad-Amin Riahi
