= Majalleh-ye Estebdad =

Iranian political and satirical weekly magazine (1907–1908)

- Editor: Sheikh Mehdi Qomi
- Categories: Political magazine; Satirical magazine
- Founder: Sheikh Mehdi Qomi
- Founded: 1907
- First issue: 16 July 1907
- Final issue Number: 24 April 1908; 34
- Country: Qajar Iran
- Based in: Tehran
- Language: Persian

Majalleh-ye Estebdad (Persian: مجلهٔ استبداد, lit. 'The Journal of Despotism') was a satirical magazine based in Tehran, Iran. It was one of the publications founded following the Iranian Constitutional Revolution, along with others such as Nasim-e-Shomal and Sur-e Esrafil.

== History and profile ==
Majalleh-ye Estebdad was launched in Tehran in 1907. The founder was Sheikh Mehdi of Qom, known as Sheikh al-Mamalek, who also edited the magazine. The first issue appeared on 16 July 1907. It was a hand-printed publication. For the issues 1–17 the format of the magazine was 16.5x20.5 centimeters, whereas for the issues 18–34 it was 10x16.5 centimeters.

Although it existed during the Iranian Constitutional Revolution it was neither a supporter of it nor an anti-constitution publication. Instead, it narrated events in the course of the revolution using satire. The magazine did not publish any cartoon or caricature.

The last issue numbered 34 appeared on 24 April 1908.
