= Sur-e Esrafil (magazine) =

Iranian political and satirical weekly magazine

- Categories: Politics, Satire
- Frequency: Weekly
- Publisher: Mirzā Jahāngir Khān
- First issue: 30 May 1907
- Final issue: 8 March 1909
- Country: Qajar Iran
- Based in: Tehran
- Language: Persian
- Website: Sur-e Esrafil

The Persian-language weekly journal Sur-e Esrafil (Persian: صور اسرافیل; DMG: Ṣūr-e Esrāfīl; English: “Trumpet of Esrafil“) was published between May 1907 and March 1909. It was one of the publications started following the Iranian constitutional revolution in addition to others, including Nasim-e-Shomal and Majalleh-ye Estebdad.

== History and profile ==
Sur-e Esrafil was launched in May 1907. The first 32 issues were published by the founder of the journal, Mirza Jahangir Khan, an Iranian author and journalist. With its liberal as well as revolutionary orientation, Sur-e Esrafil contributed significantly to supporting the Persian Constitutional Revolution. The editor published articles criticising strongly the high-class and the social situation of the country at the time and discussing controversial between conservatives and modern religion. The journal became famous due to its literary satirical elements. Ali Akbar Dehkhoda (1879-1956) was responsible for the satirical articles of the column "Charand-o Parand“ ("Nonsense"). He had a simple linguistic style in contrast to the rather literary style addressing the educated people. In this way he wanted to reach the majority of the population and address the daily problems of the common people.

During the repressions and on the command of Mohammad Ali Shah Qajar the journal was finally suspended in June 1908. Mirza Jahangir Khan was arrested and executed. Sur-e Esrafil was revived under Dekhoda who published further 3 issues of the journal from Switzerland between 23 January 1909 and 8 March 1909. It was backed by Mo’azid-al-Saltane.
