= List of French loanwords in Persian =

A great number of words of French origin have entered the Persian language since the early modern period. Persian borrowed French words as France served as the most important model of modern secular culture and education for Iran as well as many other countries of the region, particularly in the 19th and early part of the 20th century. French was also used as a second language in European royal courts and aristocratic circles and of science and fashion. The following is a partial list of these loanwords:

French	Persian (Persian alphabet)	Persian (Perso-Latin alphabet)	Meaning and usage
abat-jour	آباژور	âbâžor	floor lamp, lampshade
abcès	آبسه	âbse	abscess
abonnement	آبونمان	âbonmân	subscription
abstrait	آبستره	âbstre	abstract
acétone	استن	aseton	acetone
acide	اسید	asid	acid
accolade	آکولاد	âkolâd	brace, curly brackets
acteur	آکتور	aktor	actor
adjudant	آجودان	âjudân	warrant officer
agence	آژانس	âžâns	agency
agent	آژان	âžân	agent
album	آلبوم	âlbom	album
Allemagne	آلمان	Âlmân	Germany
allergie	آلرژی	âlerži	allergy
alliage	آلیاژ	âliâž	alloy
ambulance	آمبولانس	âmbulâns	ambulance
ampère	آمپر	âmper	unit of electric current
amphithéâtre	آمفی‌تئاتر	âmfi teâtr	amphitheatre
ampoule	آمپول	âmpul	sealed glass vial containing injection solution
ananas	آناناس	ânânâs	pineapple
annonce	آنونس	ânons	advertisement
antenne	آنتن	ânten	antenna
août	اوت	Ut	August
aphte	آفت	âft	mouth ulcer
appliqué	اپلیکه	aplike	applique
archive	آرشیو	âršiv	archive
artiste	آرتیست	ârtist	artist
ascenseur	آسانسور	âsânsor	elevator
asphalte	آسفالت	âsfâlt	asphalt
atelier	آتلیه	âtelie	atelier
atout	آتو	âtu	trump card
autobus	اتوبوس	otobus	bus
automobile	اتومبیل	otomobil	car
autorité	اتوریته	otorite	authority
Autriche	اتریش	Otriš	Austria
avance	آوانس	âvâns	advantage
avantage	آوانتاژ	âvântâž	advantage
avril	آوریل	Âvril	April
azalée	آزاله	âzâlé	azalea
bactérie	باکترى	bâkteri	bacteria
baguette	باگت	bâget	baguette
bal masqué	بالماسکه	bâl mâske	masquerade ball
balcon	بالکن	bâlkon	balcony
ballet	باله	bâle	ballet
bandage	بانداژ	bândâž	bandage
banque	بانک	bânk	bank
base	باز	bâz	base (chemistry)
bassin	باسن	bâsan	pelvis, buttocks
bâton	باتوم	bâtum	stick
batterie	باتری	bâtri	battery
Belgique	بلژیک	Belžik	Belgium
bémol	بمل	bemol	flat (music)
béton armé	بتون آرمه	beton ârme	reinforced concrete
bifteck	بیفتک	biftek	steak
bigoudi	بیگودی	bigudi	hair curler
billet	بلیط	belit	ticket
biscuit	بیسکویت	biskuit	biscuit
blouse	بلوز	boluz	shirt
bombe	بمب	bomb	bomb
bon	بن , کوپن	bon	coupon
boulevard	بلوار	bolvâr	boulevard
bourse	بورس	burs	grant
bottine	پوتین‌	putin	boot
boxeur	بوکسور	boksor	boxer
brancard	‌برانکارد	brânkârd	stretcher
brochure	بروشور	brošur	brochure, leaflet
bronzé	برنزه	bronze	tanned
brosse	برس	bros	brush
budget	بودجه‌	budje	budget
buffet	بوفه	bufe	buffet
bulletin	بولتن	bultan	news bulletin
bureaucratie	بوروکراسی	burokrâsi	bureaucracy
câble	کابل	kâbl	cable
cabaret	‌کاباره‌	kâbâre	cabaret
cabinet	کابینه	kâbine	cabinet (politics)
cacao	کاکائو	kâkâu	cocoa
cadeau	کادو	kâdo	gift
cadre	کادر	kâdr	staff
café	کافه	kâfe	coffeeshop
camion	کامیون	kâmion	truck
canal	کانال	kânâl	canal, channel
canapé	کاناپه	kânâpe	sofa
candidat	کاندیدا	kândidâ	candidate
caoutchouc	کائوچو	kâ'ucu	rubber
capot / capote	کاپوت	kâput	car hood/bonnet (also refers to condom in both languages)
capsule	کپسول	kapsul	capsule
carbonate	کربنات	karbonât	carbonate
carte	کارت‌	kârt	card
carte postale	کارت‌ پستال	kârt postâl	post card
carton	کارتن	kârton	carton
casino	کازینو	kâzino	casino
casque	کاسکت	kâsket	helmet
casquette	کاسکت	kâsket	cap
catalogue	کاتالوگ	kâtâlog	catalogue
cellule	سلول	sellul	cell
champagne	شامپاین	šâmpâyn	champagne
chantage	شانتاژ	šântâž	blackmail
chapeau	شاپو	šâpo	hat
charlatan	شارلاتان	šârlâtân	charlatan
châssis	شاسی	šâssi	chassis
chauffage	شوفاژ	šofâž	heater
chauffeur	شوفر	šufer	driver
cheminée	شومینه	šomine	fireplace
chemise	شومیز	šomiz	shirt (women)
chevalier	شوالیه	šovâlie	knight
chic	شیک	šik	chic
chiffon	شیفن	šifon	chiffon
chignon	شینیون	šinion	bun
chimie	شیمی‌	šimi	chemistry
chocolat	شکلات	šokolât	chocolate
cigare	سیگار	sigâr	cigarette
ciment	سیمان	simân	cement
cinéma	سینما	sinamâ	cinema
cirque	سیرک	sirk	circus
classe	کلاس	klâs / kelâs	class
classeur	کلاسور	klâsor / kelâsor	ring binder
classique	کلاسیک	klâsik / kelâsik	classical
cliché	کلیشه	kliše / keliše	cliché
clinique	کلینیک	klinik / kelinik	clinic
club	کلوپ	klup / kolup	club
cognac	کنیاک	konyâk	cognac (a type of French brandy)
colis	کلی	koli	parcel
collection	کلکسیون‌	koleksyon	collection
comédie	کمدی	komedi	comedy
comité	کمیته	komite	committee
commando	کماندو	komândo	commando
commissaire	کمیسر	komiser	superintendent
commission	کمیسیون	komisyon	commission
commode	کمد	komod	closet
compagnie	کمپانی	kompâni	company
compote	کمپوت	komput	stewed fruit
compresse	کمپرس	kompres / komperes	compress
compteur	کنتر	kontor	(electric) meter
concours	کنکور	konkur	entrance examination
conférence	کنفرانس	konfrâns / konferâns	conference
congrès	کنگره	kongre / kongere	congress
conserve	کنسرو	konserv	canned food
consul	کنسول	konsul	consul
contrat	کنترات	kontrât	contract
contrôle	کنترل	kontrol	control
corset	کرست	korset	corset
cosmétique	ماتیک	mâtik	a contraction of the French word cosmétique, used to refer to lipstick in Persian.
côtelette	کتلت	kotlet	cutlet
coupé	کوپه	kupe	coupé
coup d'état	کودتا	kudeta	coup, putsch, golpe
coupon	کوپن	kupon	coupon
courant d'air	کوران	kurân	air draft
course	کورس	kurs	race
cravate	کراوات	kerâvât	tie
crème	کرم	krem	cream
Crêpe de Chine	کرپ دوشین	krep došin	crepe de chine
crochet	کروشه	kroše	bracket
cuir verni	ورنی	verni	patent leather
curetage	کورتاژ	kurtâž	curettage (refers to abortion in Persian)
cylindre	سیلندر	silandr	cylinder
décembre	دسامبر	desâmbr	December
déclamer	دکلمه	deklame	to recite
décolleté	دکلته	dekolte	low-cut
décor	دکور	dekor	decor
décoration	دکوراسیون	dekorâsyon	decoration
démodé	دمده	demode	out of style
dentelle	دانتل	dântel	lace
dépôt	دپو	depo	deposit
dessert	دسر	deser	dessert
diapason	دیاپازن	diâpâzon	tuning fork
dictateur	دیکتاتور	diktâtor	dictator
dictée	دیکته	dikte	dictation
diligence	دلیجان	delijān	stage coach
diplome	دیپلم	diplom	diploma
discipline	دیسیپلین	disiplin	discipline
disque	دیسک	disk	disk
disquette	دیسکت	disket	diskette
docteur	دکتر	doktor	doctor
dose	دز	doz	dose (concentration)
douche	دوش	duš	shower
doublé	دوبله	duble	dubbed
douzaine	دوجین	dojin	dozen
drame	درام	derâm	drama
dynamo	دینام	dinâm	dynamo
eau de Cologne	ادکلن	odkolon	cologne
échantillon	اشانتیون	ešântion	sample, complimentary item
écharpe	اشارپ	ešârp	scarf
échelle	اشل	ešel	scale
économie	اکونومی	ekonomi	economy
écran	اکران	ekrân	premiere (film)
encadrer	آنکادر کردن	ânkâdr kardan	to circle
entracte	آنتراکت	ântrâkt / ânterâkt	intermission
épaule	اپل	epol	shoulder
épidémie	اپیدمی	epidemi	epidemic
équipe	اکیپ	ekip	team, group
(les) États-Unis	اتازونى	Etâzuni	United States of America
étiquette	اتیکت	etiket	price sticker
eucalyptus	اکالیپتوس	okâliptus	eucalyptus
fabrique	فابریک	fâbrik	authentic
facture	فاکتور	fâktor	invoice
famille	فامیل	fâmil	family
fantaisie	فانتزی	fântezi	fantasy
fauteuil	فوتوی	fotoy	armchair
faux col	فکل	fokol	detachable collar
fer (à friser)	فر	fer	curling iron
feutre	فوتر	fotr	felt
février	فوریه	Fevrie	February
fiche	فیش	fiš	slip, form
film	فیلم	film	film
flasque	فلاسک	flâsk / felâsk	thermos
flûte	فلوت	flut / folut	flute
forme	فرم	form	form
formalité	فرمالیته	formâlite	formality
four	فر	fer	oven
gabardine	گاباردین	gâbârdin	gabardine
gaffe	گاف	gâf	blunder
galerie	گالرى	gâleri	gallery
gamme	گام	gâm	musical scale
garage	گاراژ	gârâž	garage
garantie	گارانتى	gârânti	warranty
garçon	گارسون	gârson	waiter
garde	گارد	gârd	guard
gaz	گاز	gâz	gas
gaze	گاز	gâz	gauze
gelée	ژله	žele	jelly
gendarme	ژاندارم	žândârm	police
gendarmerie	ژاندارمرى	žândârmeri	gendarmerie
gène	ژن	žen	gene
genre	ژانر	žânr	genre
georgette	ژرژت	žoržet	georgette fabric
geste	ژست	žest	gesture
gigot	ژیگو	žigo	leg of lamb
gilet	ژیله	žile	vest
goitre	گواتر	guâtr	goitre
gravure	گراور	grâvor	engraving
grippe	گریپ	grip	influenza
guichet	گیشه	giše	ticket window
guillemet	گیومه	giume	guillemet
haltère	هالتر	hâlter	dumbbell
idéal	ایده‌آل / ایدئال	ideâl	ideal
idée	ایده	ide	opinion, idea
impérialisme	امپریالیسم	amperiâlism	imperialism
impérialiste	امپریالیست	amperiâlist	imperialist
infarctus	آنفاکتوس	ânfâktus	infarction
jambon	ژامبون	žâmbon	ham
janvier	ژانویه	Žânvie	January
Japon	ژاپن	Žâpon	Japan
jaquette	ژاکت	žâket / žâkat	jacket
jeton	ژتن	žeton	chip, token
joker	ژوکر	žoker	joker
journal	ژورنال	žornâl	newspaper
juin	ژوئن	Žu'an	June
juillet	ژوئیه	Žoiye	July
jupe	ژوپ	žup	skirt
jupon	ژوپن	župon	half slip
lancer	لانسه	lânse	launch (as a new product)
laïque	لائیک	lâik	laic, secular
laque	لاک	lâk	nail polish
licence	لیسانس	lisâns	bachelor's degree
licencié	لیسانسیه	lisânse	graduate
limonade	لیموناد	limunâd	lemonade
liqueur	لیکور	likor	liqueur
liste	لیست	list	list
lisse	لیز	liz	smooth, slippery
loge	لژ	lož	box seats
lotion	لوسیون	losyon	lotion
luge	لوژ	luž	luge
lustre	لوستر	lustr	chandelier
luxe	لوکس	luks	luxurious
machine	ماشین	mâšin	machine (also exclusively "car" in Persian)
mademoiselle	مادمازل	mâdmâzel	miss
mai	مه \ می	Me / Mey	May
maillot	مایو	mâyo	bathing suit
la Manche	مانش	mânš	The English Channel
mannequin	مانکن	mânkan	model
manœuvre	مانور	mânovr	maneuver
manteau	مانتو	mânto	coat worn by a woman
mars	مارس	Mârs	March
médaille	مدال	medâl	medal
Méditerranée	مدیترانه‌	Mediterâne	Mediterranean Sea
médiateur	مدیاتور‌	medyâtor	mediator
merci	مرسی	mersi	thank you
meuble	مبل	mobl	furniture ("armchair" or "recliner")
milliard	میلیارد	milyârd	billion
mine	مین	min	mine (weapon)
miniateur	مینیاتور	minyâtor	miniature
minijupe	مینی ژوپ	mini žup	mini-skirt
mise en plis	میزانپلی	mizânpli	hair styling
mise en scène	میزانسن	mizânsen	mise en scène
mode	مد	mod	fashion
moquette	موکت	moket	floor carpeting
montage	مونتاژ	montâž	assembly
mosaïque	موزاییک	mozâik	mosaic
moteur	موتور	motor	motor
musée	موزه	muze	museum
musique	موزیک	muzik	music
musical(e)	موزیکال	muzikâl	musical
Noël	نوئل	Noel	Christmas
Norvège	نروژ	Norvež	Norway
novembre	نوامبر	Novâmbr	November
nombre	نمره	nomre	number, grade in an exam
objet	ابژه	obže	object
octobre	اکتبر	Oktobr	October
olympique	المپیک	olampik	olympic
omelette	املت	omlet	omelette
opposition	اپوزیسیون	opozisyon	opposition
orchestre	ارکستر	orkestr	orchestra
ordre	ارد	ord	order
oreillons	اریون	oriyon	mumps
organe	ارگان	orgân	organ
orgue	ارگ	org	organ (musical instrument)
ouvert	اورت	overt	"open" (door, window, book, etc.), or "a big spender".
paletot	پالتو	pâlto	overcoat
pansement	پانسمان	pânsmân / pânsemân	dressing, bandage
(nœud) papillon	پاپیون	pâpion	bow tie
parasites	پارازیت	pârâzit	noise, static
paravent	پاراوان	pârâvân	screen
parc	پارک	pârk	park
parenthèse	پرانتز	parântez	parenthesis
parlement	پارلمان	pârlemân	parliament
passage	پاساژ	pâsâž	arcade
pastille	پاستیل	pâstil	gum candies, colored pens
pasteurisé	پاستوریزه	pâstorize	pasteurized
patinage	پاتیناژ	pâtinâž	figure skating
patio	پاسیو	pâsio	patio
pavillon	پاویون	pâvyon	pavilion
pédale	پدال	pedâl	pedal
pendule	پاندول	pândul	pendulum
pension	پانسیون	pânsyon	boarding house
père Noël	بابا نوئل / پاپا نوئل	pâpâ noel / bâbâ noel	Santa Claus
permanganate	پرمنگنات	permangenât	permanganate
phase	فاز	fâz	phase
physique	فیزیک	fizik	physics
pince	پنس	pans	pincers
pipe	پیپ	pip	smoking pipe
piste	پیست	pist	track (race)
piston	پیستون	piston	piston
placard	پلاکارد	plâkârd / pelâkârd	placard
plage	پلاژ	plâž / pelâž	seaside resort
plaque	پلاک	plâk / pelâk	plaque
plastique	پلاستیک	plâstik / pelâstik	plastic
pochette	پوشت	pošet	breast pocket handkerchief
point	پوئن	poan	score, point
pommade	پماد	pomâd	ointment
portefeuille	پورتفوی	portefoy	portfolio
portion	پرس	pors	plate of food (used as a unit)
portrait	پرتره	portre	portrait
pose	پز	poz	pose
poste	پست	post	postal service
poudre	پودر	pudr	powder
pressé	پرس	pres	press
prise	پریز	priz	socket (electrical)
processus	پروسه	prose	process
projet	پروژه	prože	project
purée	پوره	pure	puree
punaise	پونز	punez	thumb tack
quarantaine	قرنطینه	qarantine	quarantine
radar	رادار	râdâr	radar
radiateur	رادیاتور	râdiâtor	radiator
référendum	رفراندوم	refrândom	referendum
refusé	رفوزه	rofuze	failed (on a test)
régime	رژیم‌	režim	diet, regime
rendez-vous	رانده وو	rânde vu	rendezvous, date
restaurant	رستوران	resturân	restaurant
rhumatisme	روماتیسم	rumâtism	rheumatic disorder, rheumatism
rimmel (trademark)	ریمل	rimel	mascara
robe de chambre	رب دوشامبر	rob do šâmbr	nightgown
rôle	رل	rol	role
roman	رمان	român	novel
rouge (à lèvres)	روژ	rož	lipstick
ruban	روبان	rubân	ribbon
sac	ساک	sâk	bag
saise	ساز	sâz	saiz
salon	سالن	sâlon	lounge
saucisse	سوسیس	sosis	sausage
scandale	اسکاندال	eskândâl	scandal
scénario	سناریو	senârio	scenario, movie script
scène	سن	sen	theater stage
séchoir	سشوار	sešuâr	hair dryer
sénat	سنا	senâ	senate
septembre	سپتامبر	Septâmbr	September
série	سریال / سری	seri / seriâl	series
seringue	سرنگ	sorang	syringe
sérum	سرم	serom	serum
service	سرویس	servis	service, set
Sibérie	سیبری	Sibri	Siberia
silice	سیلیس	silis	silica (silicon dioxide)
silo	سیلو	silu	silo, store-pit
sionisme	صیونیسم / صهیونیسم	Sionism / Sehyunism	Zionism
siphon	سیفن	sifon	flush (toilet)
soupape	سوپاپ	supâp	valve
soupe	سوپ	sup	soup
soutien-gorge	سوتین	sutian	bra
stage	استاژ	estâž	training
standard	استاندارد	estândârd	standard
sujet	سوژه	suže	topic
symbole	سمبل‌	sambol	symbol
syncope	سنکوپ	sankop	fainting
syndicat	سندیکا	sandikâ	syndicate
synthèse	سنتز	santez	synthesis (chemical)
système	سیستم	sistem	system
tableau	تابلو	tâblo	painting
teinture	طنطور	tantur	tincture
télésiège	تله سیژ	telesiež	chairlift
terreur	ترور	teror	terror
théâtre	تئاتر	teâtr	theater
thème	تم	tem	theme
théorie	تئوری	teori	theory
thèse	تز	tez	thesis
thon	تن	ton	tuna
timbre	تمبر	tambr	postage stamp
tirage	تیراژ	tirâž	newspaper circulation
tiret	خط) تیره)	(xatt e) tire	hyphen
titre	تیتر	titr	headline
toilette	توالت	tuâlet	toilet
tracteur	تراکتور	trâktor / terâktor	Tractor
tragédie	تراژدی	trâžedi	tragedy
transit	ترانزیت	trânzit	transit
tulle	تور	tur	tulle
tumeur	تومور	tumor	tumor
tunnel	تونل	tunel	tunnel
ultimatum	اولتیماتوم	ultimâtom	ultimatum
urgence	اورژانس	uržâns	emergency
vaccin	‌واکسن	vâksan	vaccine
vagin	واژن	vâžan	vagina
vanille	‌وانیل	vânil	vanilla
villa	ویلا	vilâ	villa
virage	ویراژ	virâž	stunt act
virgule	ویرگول	virgul	comma
virus	ویروس	virus	virus
vitamine	ویتامین	vitâmin	vitamin
vitrine	ویترین	vitrin	display window
xerox	زیراکس	zirâks	xerox

== See also ==
- Persian vocabulary
- Francisation
- France–Iran relations
