= Amir Banoo Karimi =

Iranian academic (1931–2023)

Amir-Banoo Karimi
- امیربانو کریمی
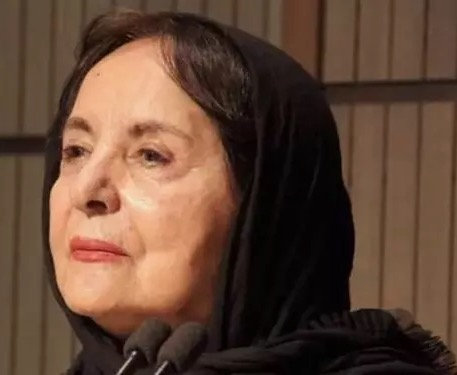
- Born: 31 December 1931; Tehran, Imperial State of Iran
- Died: 31 December 2023 (aged 92); Sari, Iran
- Education: University of Tehran
- Occupation: Academic
- Spouse: Mozaher Mosaffa
- Children: 5, including Ali
- Father: Seyed Karim Amiri Firuzkuhi
- Relatives: Leila Hatami (daughter-in-law)

Amir-Banoo Karimi (Amiri Firouzkuhi/ Mosaffa; Persian: امیربانو کریمی; 31 December 1931 – 31 December 2023) was an Iranian academic and professor of Persian literature, specialising in classical Persian literature and the work of Saib Tabrizi. In 2004, Karimi was inducted into the Iranian Science and Culture Hall of Fame for her lifelong contributions to Persian studies, language, and literature.

== Life and career ==
Amir Banoo Karimi was the eldest child of Iranian poet, Seyed Karim Amiri Firuzkuhi.

Born in Tehran during the reign of Reza Shah, Amir Banoo was unable to acquire her father's last name, namely, Amiri Firuzkuhi, due to its political connotations, "Amir" meaning king or emir hence, Emir of Firuzkuh. Consequently, she was forced to adopt her father's first name, Karim as her last name.

Karimi pursued her education in the field of Persian Literature at the University of Tehran where she also taught as a professor upon graduation. She later married Mozaher Mosaffa, a Persian poet and professor of Persian literature at the University of Tehran.

Karimi died on 31 December 2023, her 92nd birthday, from pulmonary heart disease.

== Selected works ==
=== Books ===
Works include but are not limited to:

- Edited edition 1 through 4 of Jawami ul-Hikayat
- Compilation and critique of the two editions of the Divan-i Amiri Firuzkuhi: Ghazaliyat va Qasa'id by Seyed Karim Amiri Firuzkuhi
- (1989) The Ghazals of Saib Tabrizi
- (1993) Edited edition of the Divan of Hakim Abdolrazagh Lahiji, publication of the University of Tehran Press.
- (1995) Critical Analysis of Hakim Sanai's The Walled Garden of Truth

=== Articles ===
Prominent literary essays include:

- The Missing Sources of Jawami ul-Hikayat
- The Double-Sided Coin: Mansur Al-Hallaj
- The Representation of Women in Persian Poetry
- Saba's Illness

== See also ==
- Seyed Karim Amiri Firuzkuhi
- Ali Mosaffa
- Jafar Shahidi
