= Moin Encyclopedic Dictionary =

Mo'in Encyclopedic Dictionary (Persian: فرهنگ فارسی معین, Farhang-e Mo'īn) is the second largest Persian encyclopedic dictionary. It was collected and integrated by Professor Mohammad Mo'in.

== History ==
The Moin Encyclopedic Dictionary was compiled during a 19-year period (1947-1966) under the administration of Mohammad Mo'in. After his death in 1971, the dictionary had been completed by Ja'far Shahidi.

Finally, it was published in 1972 by Amir Kabir Publishers in Tehran, Iran, in six volumes — four volumes for Persian words, compounds, and expressions, and two volumes for proper nouns.

The dictionary has not been updated since its first publishing, but has been reprinted many times by several publishers inside Iran.
