= Golsar, Gilan =

Golsar گلسار
- Neighborhood
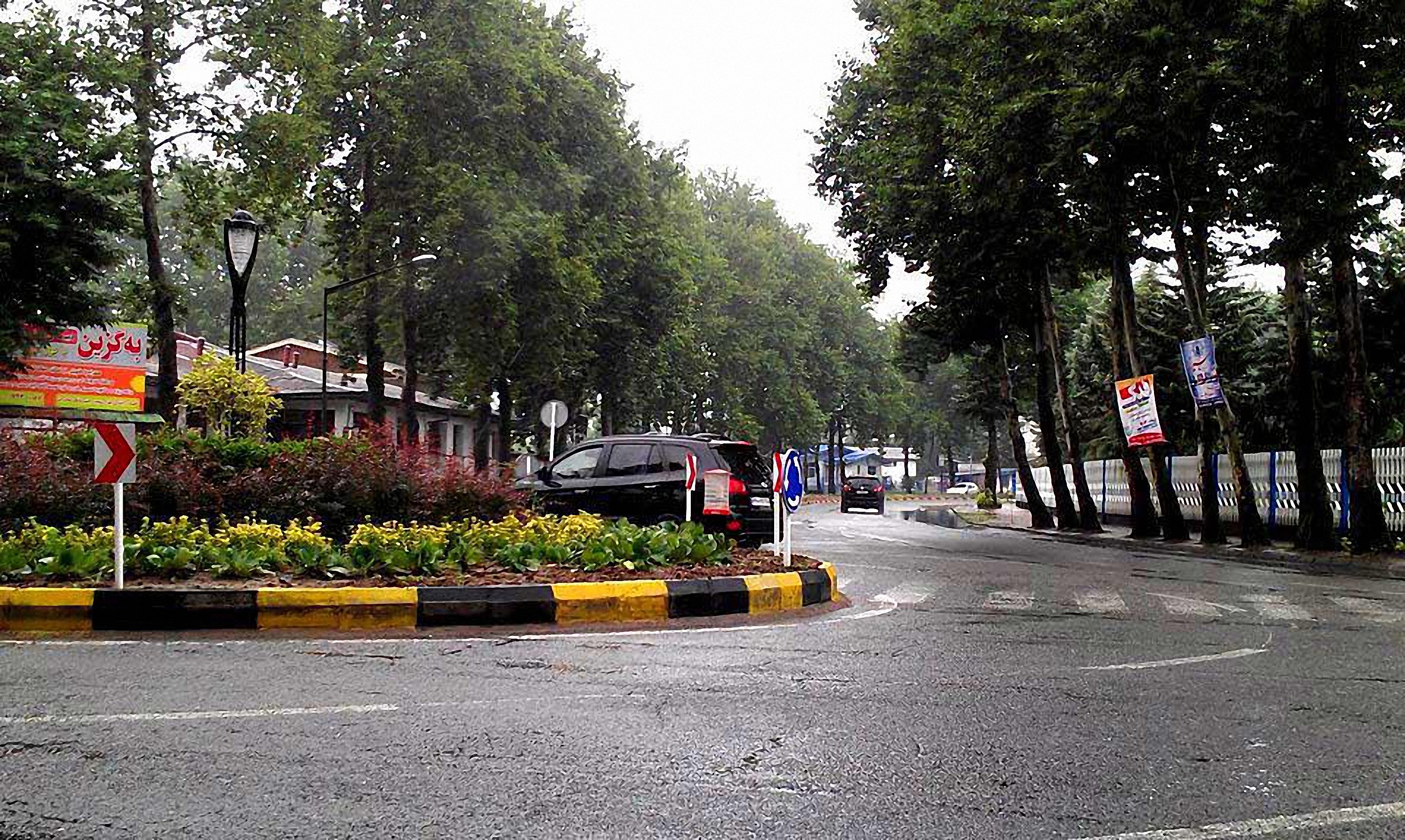
- Interactive map of Golsar
- Coordinates: 37°18′09″N 49°35′15″E
- Country: Iran
- Province: Gilan
- County: Rasht
- City: Rasht
- Established: July 1972
- Time zone: UTC+3:30 (IRST)

Golsar, pronounced golsâr (Persian: گلسار), is a neighborhood of the city of Rasht in Gilan Province, Iran. It borders the Zarjoob river to its west, Pastak to its north, Ansari ave. to its south and the Deylaman neighborhood to its east.

== History and Planning ==
Golsar's construction started as a town in 9 July 1972, during which time it was called 'Boosar'. After announcing a public call and based on people's suggestions, the name of the town was changed to "Golsar" in 6 September 1972. The town's urban design was done Dr. Ali abadi, who also designed Shahinshahr city in Isfahan province.

The township was designed for a population of 15,000 people and a covered area of 1,700,000 m^{2} (420 acres), with 1,500 villa houses and 700 apartments built and sold. In addition to residential units, the Golsar Mosque was also planned, along with a clinic, a high school, and stores to meet the needs of the town's residents. The width of the streets was considered to be 45 m (49 yd), and green space with towering trees around the streets was part of the town plan. The appearance of this town has changed greatly from a villa town to an area with apartment complexes and multi-unit residential, office, and commercial complexes.

Administratively, Golsar is in the 1st municipal district of Rasht. The main roads in the area are: Golsar Blvd, Somayyeh Blvd, Towhid(Naz) Blvd, Gilan Blvd, Namaz Ave, Deylaman Blvd, Isfahan Blvd, Navvab Ave, and Moein Ave(Sonbol Blvd.).

== Tourism ==
Golsar is one of the favorite sights of Rasht among citizens and tourists, popular for its shopping centers, stores for famous brands, restaurants, cafes and parks.
