= Amir Kabir Publishers =

Iranian publishing house

Amir Kabir Publishers (Persian: انتشارات امیرکبیر; Entišarat-e Amir Kabir; also romanized as Amir-Kabir or Amar-i Kabir) is a publishing house based in Tehran, Iran. It was founded on November 19, 1949, by Abdorrahim "Taghi" Jafari. It is named after Mirza Taghi Khan Amirkabir (better known as Amir Kabir) (1807–1852), who was chief minister during the reign of Naser al-Din Shah Qajar and is sometimes referred to as the Amirkabir Publication Institute.

== Company history ==
Following the Islamic Revolution in 1979, the Iranian government seized Amir Kabir Publishers's assets. Subsequently, the organization's new owners imposed a new management structure. The publishing house is still active, but only publishes previously published material, classics, and conservative new books. Amir Kabir Publishers is the publisher of The Persian Encyclopedia.

The Amir Kabir Publishers edition of Sadegh Hedayat's novel بوف کور (The Blind Owl) was one of the titles selected for the Library of Congress 2014 "A Thousand Years of the Persian Book" exhibition.

The firm regularly attends the Tehran International Book Fair and overseas book fairs, including at Frankfurt and Bologna.

== Book series ==
- Études iraniennes (Centre iranien pour le dialogue des civilisations)
- Kitāb-hā-yi ṭalā'ī (کتاب‌های طلائى) (English, "Golden Books")
- Pocket Tales (2026– )
- Shāhkār-hā-yi adabīiyāt-i Fārsī (شاهکارهای ادبیات فارسى) (English: "Masterpieces of Persian Literature") (1954– )

== See also ==
- Office of Literature and Art of Resistance
