= Ali-Akbar Dehkhoda =

Iranian linguist and lexicographer (1879–1956)

Allamah Ali-Akbar Dehkhoda
- علی‌اکبر دهخدا
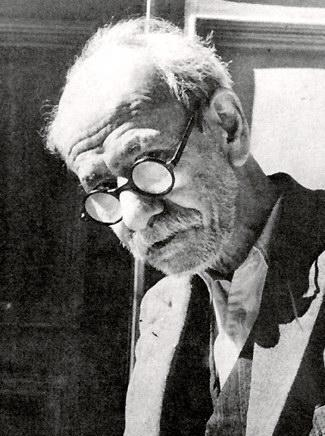
- Ali-Akbar Dehkhoda
- Born: Ali-Akbar Ghazvini; 1879; Qazvin, Iran
- Died: 9 March 1956 (aged 77); Tehran, Iran
- Resting place: Ibn Babawayh Cemetery, Ray
- Occupations: Lexicographer, Linguist, Satirist
- Notable work: Amsāl o Hekam (Proverbs and Sayings); Dehkhoda Dictionary; Charand-o Parand (pronounced: Čarand-o Parand; lit. 'fiddle-faddle'); French-Persian Dictionary
- Political party: Moderate Socialists Party

Allamah Ali-Akbar Dehkhodā (Persian: علی‌اکبر دهخدا; 1879 – 9 March 1956) was a prominent Iranian literary writer, philologist, and lexicographer.

He was the author of the Dehkhoda Dictionary, the most extensive dictionary of the Persian language published to date.

== Biography ==
Dehkhoda was born in Tehran to parents from Qazvin. His father, Khan-Baba Khan Ghazvini, died when he was only 9 years old.

Dehkhoda excelled quickly in Persian literature, Arabic, and French. He enrolled at the School of Political Science, which employed, amongst other figures, the Minister of Foreign Affairs and his Secretary as lecturers.

He was also active in politics, and served in the Majles as a Member of Parliament from Kerman and Tehran. He also served as Dean of Tehran School of Political Science and later the School of Law of the University of Tehran.

In 1903, he went to the Balkans as an Iranian embassy employee, but came back to Iran two years later and became involved in the Constitutional Revolution of Iran.

Dehkhoda, Mirza Jahangir Khan and Ghasem Khan published the Sur-e Esrafil newspaper for about two years, until Mohammad Ali Shah Qajar disbanded the parliament and banished Dehkhoda and some other liberals into exile in Europe. There he continued publishing articles and editorials, but when Mohammad Ali Shah was deposed in 1911, he returned to the country and became a member of the new Majlis.

He is buried in Ebn-e Babooyeh cemetery in Shahr-e Ray, near Tehran.

In his article "First Iranian Scholar who authored the Most Extensive & Comprehensive Farsi Dictionary," Manouchehr Saadat Noury wrote that,

The literary and commentary works of Ali Akbar Dehkhoda (AAD) actually started through his collaboration with Journal of Soor Esrafeel where he created a satirical political column entitled as Nonsense or Fiddle-Faddle (in Persian: Charand Parand). The Persian term of Dakho was his signature or his pen name for that column. Dakho means not only as the Administrator of a Village (in Persian: Dehkhoda or Kadkhoda), but it also refers to a Naive or an Unsophisticated Person (in Persian: Saadeh Lowh).

== Works ==
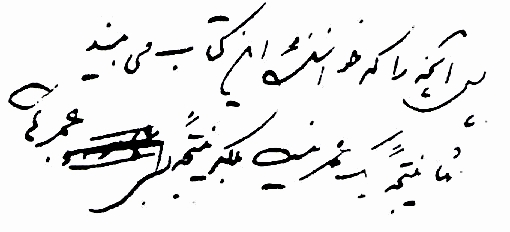
Dehkhoda's personal note: "What the reader of this dictionary sees is not the fruit of a lifetime of endeavour, it is the fruit of many lifetimes of endeavour."

Dehkhoda translated Montesquieu's De l'esprit des lois (The Spirit of the Laws) into Persian.

He also wrote Amsal o Hekam ("Proverbs and Sayings") in four volumes, a French-Persian Dictionary, and other books.

His lexicographic masterpiece is Loghat-nameh-ye Dehkhoda ("Dehkhoda Dictionary"), the largest Persian dictionary ever published, in 15 volumes. Mohammad Moin accomplished Dehkhoda's unfinished volumes according to Dehkhoda's request after him. Finally the book was published after forty five years of efforts of Dehkhoda.

== See also ==
- Dehkhoda Dictionary Institute
- Iranian studies
- List of Persian-language poets and authors
- Persian literature
