= Ashraf Gilani =

Iranian poet and newspaper editor

Seyed Ashrafedin Hosseini Gilani
- سید اشرف‌الدین حسینی گیلانی
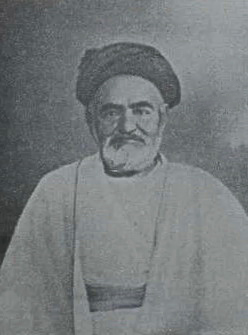
- Ashrafedin in his final years

Personal details
- Born: 1870 Qazvin, Sublime State of Iran
- Died: 1934 (aged 63–64) Tehran, Imperial State of Iran
- Occupation: Poet, writer
- Profession: Founder and editor of newspaper Nasim-e-Shomal

Seyed Ashrafedin Hosseini Gilani (Persian: سید اشرف‌الدین حسینی گیلانی; 1870–1934) was a combatant poet in Iran's constitutional revolution and the editor of the Nasim-e-Shomal (lit. 'Northern Breeze '), a short-lived newspaper that used poems and satire to comment on the political and social situation of Iran at the time.

== Early life and education ==
Ashrafedin born in 1870 in Qazvin. He lost his father when he was only six months old. His paternal heritage was usurped. This brought him and his family into extreme poverty.

Ashrafedin finished his elementary education in his home town then went to Najaf (Iraq) for religious education. He came back to Iran after five years and continued his studies there.

It was in 1906 while living in Rasht (north of Iran) that he got to know the leaders of the constitutional revolution and started publishing the weekly newspaper, Nasim-e Shomal.

== Constitutional Revolution ==
The revolution in 1906 was suppressed in its early stages. After the bombardment and dissolution of the parliament by Mohammad Ali Shah Qajar, Ashrafedin fled to Eshtehard, in the suburb of capital Tehran. A few months later when he returned to Rasht he became influenced by the leaders of the Social-Democrats of the Caucasus. This effect was later visible in the articles published in Nasim-e Shomal.

== Death ==
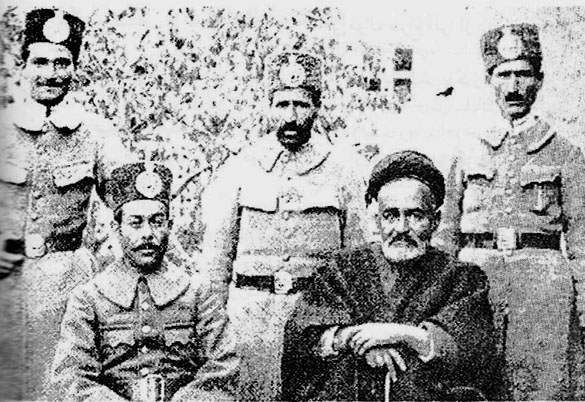
This photo was taken the day Ashrafedin was arrested

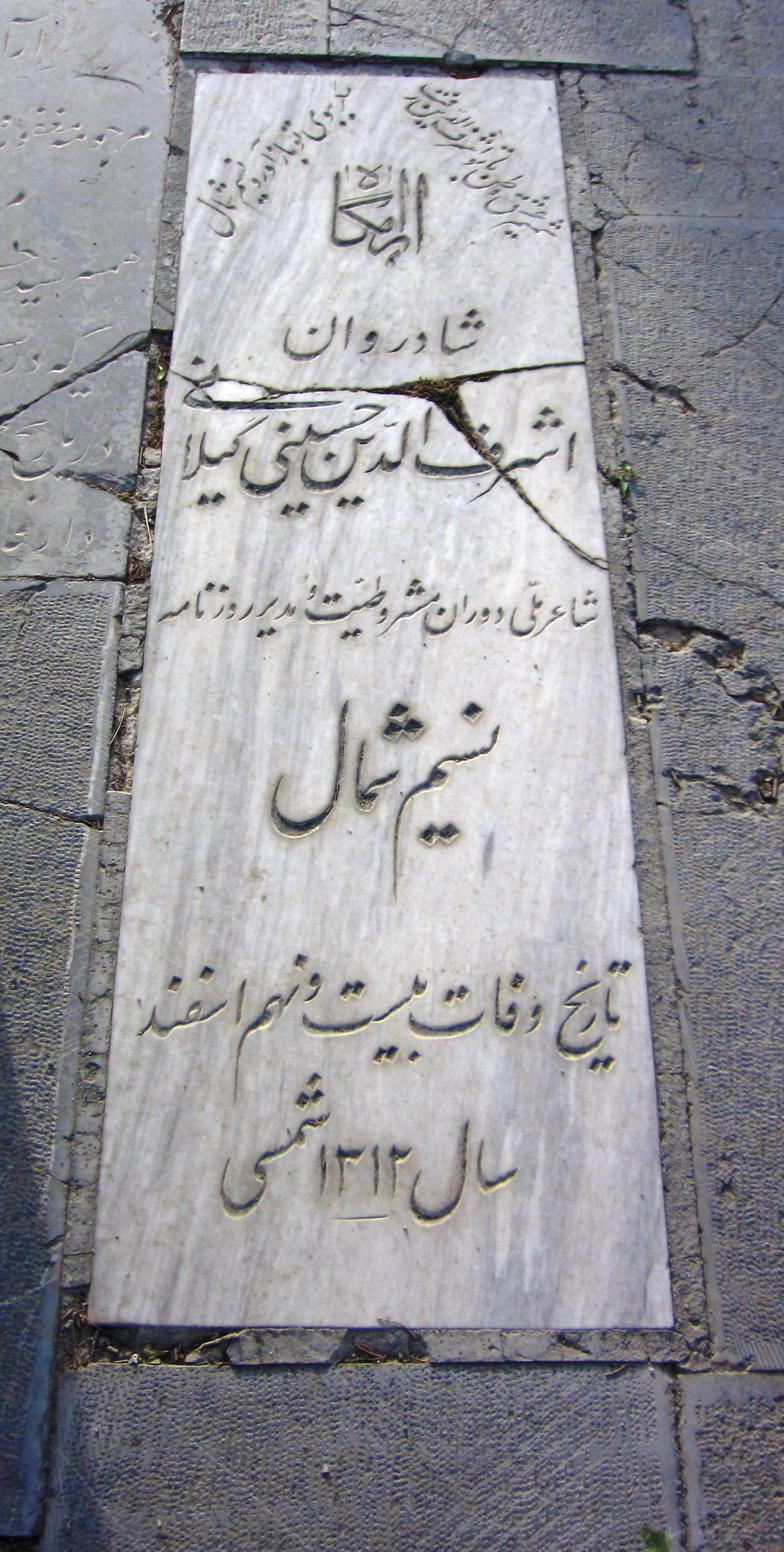
The grave of Ashrafedin

Ashrafedin was finally arrested for his anti government activities. The exact date of his arrest in unknown. As it was announced in his newspaper, Nasim-e Shomal, Ashrafedin died on 20 March 1934 in Tehran. He was buried in a cemetery near the city of Rey south of the capital Tehran. The Nasim-e Shomal did not last long after his death.
