= Mohammad Moin =

Iranian scholar (1914–1971)

Mohamad Moin
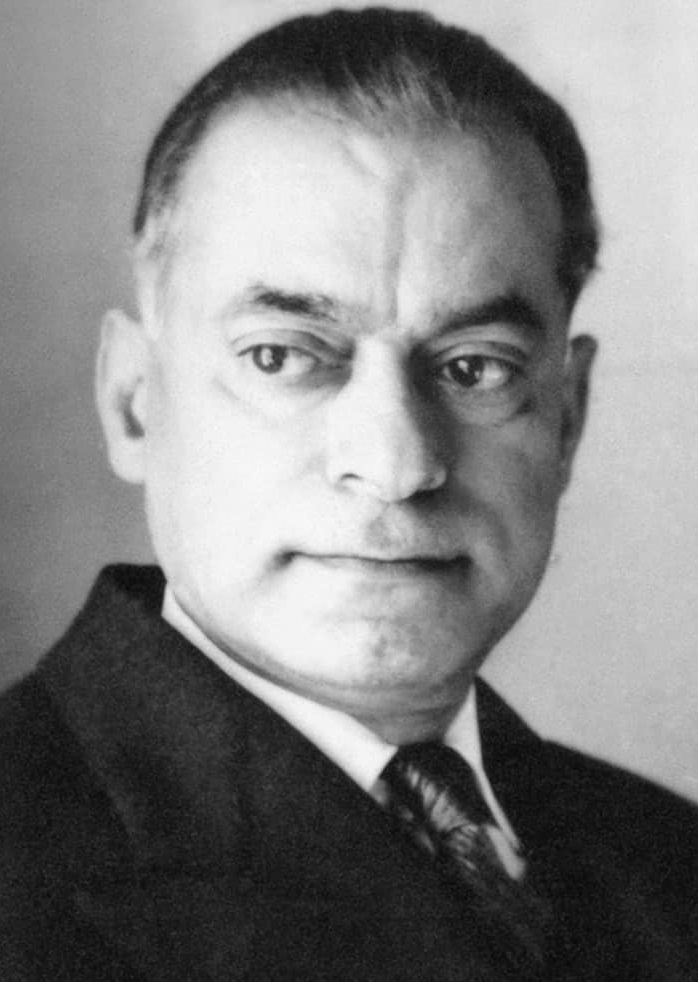
- Mohamad Moin
- Born: 12 June 1914; Zarjoob, Rasht, Qajar Iran
- Died: 4 July 1971 (aged 57); Tehran, Pahlavi Iran
- Resting place: Astaneh-ye Ashrafiyeh, Gilan, Iran
- Occupations: Professor, University of Tehran
- Spouse: Mahin Amir Jahed
- Children: 4
- Writing career
- Notable work: Mo'in Dictionary

Mohammad Moin (Persian: محمد معین, his surname could also be transliterated as Mo'in; 12 July 1914, in Rasht, Iran – 4 July 1971, in Tehran, Iran) was an Iranian scholar of Persian literature and Iranian studies.

== Education ==
Moin studied at the Higher Institute of Science in Tehran and obtained his BA in literature and philosophy in 1934. He subsequently went to Belgium and graduated in applied psychology, anthropology and cognitive science under Elmer Knowles. On returning to Iran he carried out his doctoral research under Ebrahim Pourdavoud at the University of Tehran, culminating in a thesis with the title "Mazdayasna and its Influence on Persian Literature" for which he received a PhD with honors in Persian literature and linguistics. He is the first doctoral graduate in Persian literature from the University of Tehran.

== Career ==
He was later appointed full professor at University of Tehran, from which position he was subsequently promoted as Distinguished Professor to the Chair of Literary Criticism and Research in Literary Texts at the same university. He is best known for his famous Moin Encyclopedic Dictionary as well as his contributions to the Dehkhoda Dictionary.

Mo'in was President of the literature commission of the International Congress of Iranian Studies and Director of the Dehkhoda Dictionary Institute.

Mohammad Mo'in died in 1971 in Tehran. He is buried in Astaneh Ashrafiyeh, Gilan, Iran. His burial chamber was vandalized in 1981 by vigilantes, thought to be due to Mo'in's ties to the political elite of the Pahlavi era.

== Literary works and publications ==
- Moin, Mohammad; Dehkhoda, Ali Akbar (1958). Dehkhoda Dictionary Encyclopedia - Loghat Nameh Dehkhoda ("Volume 50"). College of Science and Literature, University of Tehran.

== Awards and honours ==
- Third degree scientific badge in 1316 AH.
- Second degree scientific badge in 1321
- Second degree of gratitude badge in 1327.
- Tamhour Prize from the Académie des Inscriptions in 1321.
- The highest award of "Art and Literature" by the French government in 1340.

== See also ==
- Iranistics
