= Nasim-e-Shomal =

Iranian weekly newspaper (1907–1933)

- Type: Weekly
- Owner: Seyed Ashrafedin Hosseini
- Founder: Seyed Ashrafedin Hosseini
- Founded: September 1907
- Ceased publication: 1933
- Political alignment: Independent
- Language: Persian
- Headquarters: Rasht; Tehran

Nasim-e-Shomal (Persian: نسیم شمال, romanized: Nasim-e šomāl, lit. 'Northern Breeze') was a weekly newspaper that existed between September 1907 and 1933 with intervals. Along with Sur-e Esrafil, Majalleh-ye Estebdad and others, it was one of the publications started following the Iranian constitutional revolution.

Sorour Soroudi describes the paper as a "one-man weekly newspaper". The weekly was a pioneer in using poems and satire in presenting the political and social situation of Iran at the time and was identified with its founder and editor, Seyed Ashrafedin Hosseini, a well-known poet. Over time Seyed Ashrafedin Hosseini was called Mr. Nasim-e-Shomal.

== History and profile ==
The founder of Nasim-e-Shomal was an Iranian poet, Seyed Ashrafedin Hosseini, mostly known as Gilani. The title was a reference to the Russian Revolution of 1905. The paper was launched by Gilani in Rasht on 10 September 1907 soon after the Iranian constitutional revolution. Gilani designed the paper to fight against despotism and to this end, he avoided producing a mainstream publication. Instead, he covered his poems, satire and other literary work to disseminate his views in an attractive way. His writings were also about women and their functions. The paper came out weekly in Rasht until 1912 when Gilani had to move to Tehran due to the destruction of his publishing house by Russians. In Tehran Gilani published the paper in a publishing house owned by Jewish people and continued to criticize the existing political environment through his poems. During his period Nasim-e-Shomal was the most-read paper in the country selling over 4,000 copies although it was consisted of only two pages. From 1925 when Reza Shah became the ruler the paper did not contain oppositional material.

Nasim-e-Shomal ceased publication in 1933.

== Spin off ==
Following the death of Gilani the title was published by other journalists from 29 May 1934 to November 1940. However, this spin off was not similar to original Nasim-e-Shomal since it became a regular newspaper without its successor's attraction and originality.
