= Farahabad, Tehran =

Farahabad فرح آباد
- Village
- Location within Iran
- Coordinates: 35°38′40″N 52°39′18″E
- Country: Iran
- Province: Tehran
- County: Firuzkuh
- Bakhsh: Central
- Rural District: Hablerud

Population (2016)
  - Total: 67
- Time zone: UTC+3:30 (IRST)

Farahabad (Persian: فرح آباد, also Romanized as Faraḩābād) is a village in Hablerud Rural District, in the Central District of Firuzkuh County, Tehran Province, Iran.

At the time of the 2006 National Census, the village's population was 124 in 41 households. The following census in 2011 counted 149 people in 52 households. The 2016 census measured the population of the village as 67 people in 28 households.
