= Persian vocabulary =

Vocabulary of the Persian language

Persian belongs to the Indo-European language family, and many words in modern Persian usage ultimately originate from Proto-Indo-European. The language makes extensive use of word building techniques such as affixation and compounding to derive new words from roots. Persian has also had considerable contact with other languages, resulting in many borrowings.

== Native word formation ==
Persian is very powerful in word building and versatile in ways a word can be built from combining affixes, stems, nouns and adjectives. Having many affixes to form new words (over a hundred), and the ability to build affixes and specially prefixes from nouns, (Note: Such as سگ (dog) in سگ‌مست (stoned, drunk) as well as خر (donkey) in خرمست and سیاه (black) in سیاه‌مست with the same meaning.) The Persian language is also claimed to be and demonstrated as an agglutinative language since it also frequently uses derivational agglutination to form new words from nouns, adjectives, and verbal stems. New words are also extensively formed by compounding – two existing words combining into a new one, as is common in German, Sanskrit and hence most of the Indian languages. The Persian dictionary consists of 343,466 words.

An example set of words derived from a present stem combined with some of available affixes:

Persian	Components	English	Word class
dān دان	dān دان	Present stem of dānestan (to know)	Verbal stem
dāneš دانش	dān + -eš دان + ش	knowledge	Noun
dānešmand دانشمند	dān + -eš + -mand دان + ش + مند	Scientist, scholar	Noun
dānešmandāne دانشمندانه	dān + -eš + -mand + -ān + -e دان + ش + مند + ان + ه	Scholarly	Adverb
dānešgāh دانشگاه	dān + -eš + -gāh دان + ش + گاه	university	Noun
dānešgāhi دانشگاهی	dān + -eš + -gāh + -i دان + ش + گاه + ی	pertaining to university; scholar; scholarly	Adjective
hamdānešgāhi هم‌دانشگاهی	ham- + dān + -eš + -gāh + -i هم + دان + ش + گاه + ی	university-mate	Noun
dāneškade دانشکده	dān + -eš + -kade دان + ش + کده	faculty	Noun
dānešju دانشجو	dān + -eš + -ju دان + ش + جو	student	Noun
dānā دانا	dān + -ā دان + ا	wise, learned	Adjective
dānāyi دانایی	dān + -ā + -i دان + ا + ی	wisdom	Noun
nādān نادان	nā- + dān نا + دان	ignorant; foolish	Adjective
nādāni نادانی	nā- + dān + -i نا + دان + ی	ignorance; foolishness	Noun
dānande داننده	dān + -ande دان + نده	one who knows	Adjective
dānandegi دانندگی	dān + -ande + -gi دان + نده + گی	knowing	Noun

An example set of words derived from a past stem combined with some of available affixes:

Persian	Components	English	Word class
did دید	did دید	Past stem of didan (to see)	Verbal stem
did دید	did دید	sight; vision	Noun
didan دیدن	did + -an دید + ن	to see	Infinitive
didani دیدنی	did + -an + -i دید + ن + ی	worth seeing	Adjective
didār دیدار	did + -ār دید + ار	visit; act of meeting	Noun
didāri دیداری	did + -ār + -i دید + ار + ی	visional, of the sense of sight	Adjective
dide دیده	did + -e دید + ه	seen; what seen	Past participle; Noun
nādide ندیده	nâ- + did + -e ن + دید + ه	what unseen	Noun
didgāh دیدگاه	did + -gâh دید + گاه	point of view	Noun
didebān دیدبان	dide + -bān دید + ه + بان	watchman	Noun
didebāni دیدبانی	dide + -bān + -i دید + ه + بان + ی	watchman-ship	Noun
didegān دیدگان	dide + -gān دید + ه + گان	eyes	Noun

== External influences ==
Loanwords in the Persian language mostly came from Arabic, French, and Turkic languages; though the extent of Turkic influence differs greatly by dialect. Recently, some English loanwords have entered the language as well. In Dari, there are numerous words of Indian origin (Sanskrit and Hindustani [Hindi-Urdu] of Indo-Aryan; and Dravidian languages as well).

Persian has likewise influenced the vocabularies of other languages, especially Arabic, Armenian, Georgian, Indo-Iranian languages and Turkic languages. Many Persian words have also found their way into the English language.

=== Arabic influence ===
The Arab conquest of Iran lasted for two centuries, from the 7th to the 9th CE. During this period, Arabic words were imported into the Persian language, and a number of Persian words found their way into Arabic. Persian words of Arabic origin especially include Islamic terms. Arabic has had an influence on the Persian lexicon, but it has not affected the structure of the language. The morphological process used to obtain these lexical elements has not been imported into Persian and is not productive in the language.

These Arabic words have been imported and lexicalized in Persian. So, for instance, the Arabic plural form for ketāb (كتاب) ["book"] is kotob (كتب) obtained by the root derivation system. In Persian, the plural for the lexical word ketâb is obtained by simply adding the Persian plural morpheme hā: ketāb+hā → ketābhā (كتاب‌ها). Also, any new Persian words can only be pluralized by the addition of this plural morpheme since the Arabic root system is not a productive process in Persian. In addition, since the plurals formed by the Arabic morphological system constitute only a small portion of the Persian vocabulary (about 5% in the Shiraz corpus), it is not necessary to include them in the morphology; they are instead listed in the dictionary as irregular forms.

In fact, among Iranians there have been sporadic efforts as far back as the Safavid era (1501–1736) to revive a purer version of Persian by diminishing the use of Arabic loanwords in their language. Both Pahlavi Shahs supported such efforts in the 20th century by creating the academy of Persian Language and Literature. In 1934, Reza Shah ordered the reconstruction of the tomb of Ferdowsi, who is regarded as the savior of the Persian language. A ceremony in Tehran and Mashhad was held to celebrate a thousand years of Persian literature since the time of Ferdowsi, titled the Ferdowsi millennial celebration (Persian: جشن هزاره فردوسی).

Academy of Persian language and literature after the Iranian revolution continued its striving to protect the integrity of the Persian language. However, the attention of the academy has been turned towards the persistent infiltration of Persian, like many other languages, with English words, as a result of the globalization process. Since the 1980s, the academy constantly campaigns for the use of the Persian equivalents of these new English loanwords. It also has the task of linguistically deriving such words from existing Persian roots if no such equivalents exist, and actively promoting the adoption of these new coinages instead of their English equivalents in the daily lives of the Persian-speaking people in Iran, Afghanistan and Tajikistan.

=== Turkic influence ===
Speakers of Turkic languages and Iranian language have been in contact since pre-Islamic times; as such there are notable Turkic forms (including Mongolian borrowings through Turkic) that have entered the Persian language. Throughout history, the Persian-speaking realm was ruled by a succession of dynasties of Turkic origin, notably Ghaznavid, Seljuk, the Sultanate of Rum and Timurid which have patronized Persian culture and literature. With the exception of certain official designations within the government, trade and military, many of the Turkic borrowings in Persian have a more informal, homely flavour, and therefore, to many Persian native speakers these words do not feel like foreign: e.g. āqā 'mister', dowqolu 'twin', komak 'help', tumān 'official currency of Iran' (but riāl < Portuguese), yābu 'pack nag', qešlāq 'winter quarters', yeylāq 'summer quarters', qeyči 'scissors'. The usage of Turkic loan words varies by dialect; generally, eastern dialects such as: Tajik, Dari, and Hazaragi have more Turkic influence than Iranian Persian.

=== French and other European influences ===
Over the past couple of centuries, Persian has borrowed many loanwords from European languages (mainly French). (Note: Prevalence of French influence varies by Dialect.) A lot of these loanwords were originally French and use French pronunciation, also other common words mainly come from English, Italian, German, Portuguese, and Russian (example: samovar) as well. Persian borrowed French words as France served as the most important model of modern secular culture and education for Iran as well as many other countries of the region, particularly in the 19th and early part of the 20th century. French was also used as a second language in European royal courts and aristocratic circles and of science and fashion. Through trade, Portuguese entered Persian from the 15th century.

The table below shows some examples of common French/Persian words.

Persian	French	English
دوش duš	douche	shower
مرسی mersi	merci	thanks
گارسون gārson	garçon	waiter
مانتو mānto	manteau	women's coat
شوفاژ šufāž	chauffage	radiator
شومینه šomine	cheminée	fireplace
اتوبوس otobus	autobus	bus
کراوات kerāvāt	cravate	tie

== See also ==
- List of French loanwords in Persian
- List of English words of Persian origin
- Academy of Persian Language and Literature
