= Dehkhoda Dictionary Institute =

Persian language center in Iran

Coordinates: 35.801947°N 51.42013°E

Dehkhoda Lexicon Institute & International Center for Persian Studies
- مؤسسه لغت‌نامه دهخدا و مرکز بین‌المللی آموزش زبان فارسی
- Formation: before 1945
- Founder: Aliakbar Dehkhoda
- Location: Tehran, Iran
- Official language: Persian
- Parent organization: University of Tehran
- Website: dehkhoda.ut.ac.ir/en

The Dehkhoda Lexicon Institute & International Center for Persian Studies (Persian: مؤسسه لغت‌نامه دهخدا و مرکز بین‌المللی آموزش زبان فارسی) is the main official international center for teaching Persian language and literature in Iran. It was founded formally in 1945 and is now part of the University of Tehran. It is named after Ali-Akbar Dehkhoda, known as "Dehkhoda", a prominent Iranian literary scholar, poet, and author.

== History ==
The institute traces its origins to a 1925 Iranian law decreeing the compilation of an official Persian dictionary. Work on the dictionary was begun by Dehkhoda, and upon his death, his residence was named the Dehkhoda Institute, and housed the academic staff from several Iranian universities who compiled the dictionary. In 1957, responsibility for the dictionary was delegated to Tehran University's Department of Persian Language and Literature, and The Dehkhoda Institute became part of the University of Tehran. It is located in Valiasr Street near the Tajrish district of North Tehran. It is a part of Dr Mahmoud Afshar's foundation.

== Current activities ==
The institute offers basic, intermediate and advanced courses in Persian for foreign and Iranian students, as well as higher level courses for graduates of Persian Language and Literature, Oriental Studies and Iranian Studies.

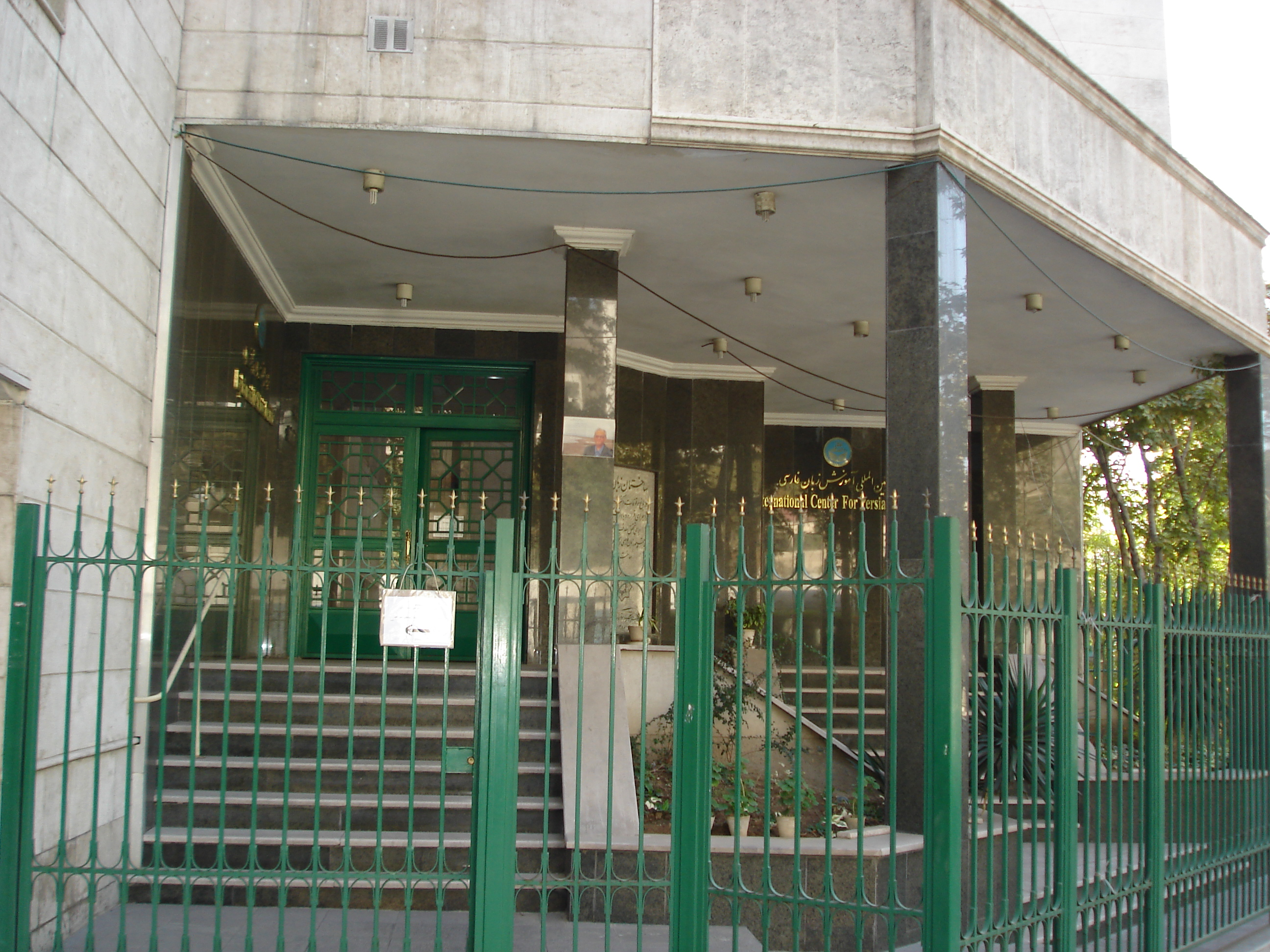
Entrance of Dehkhoda Institute

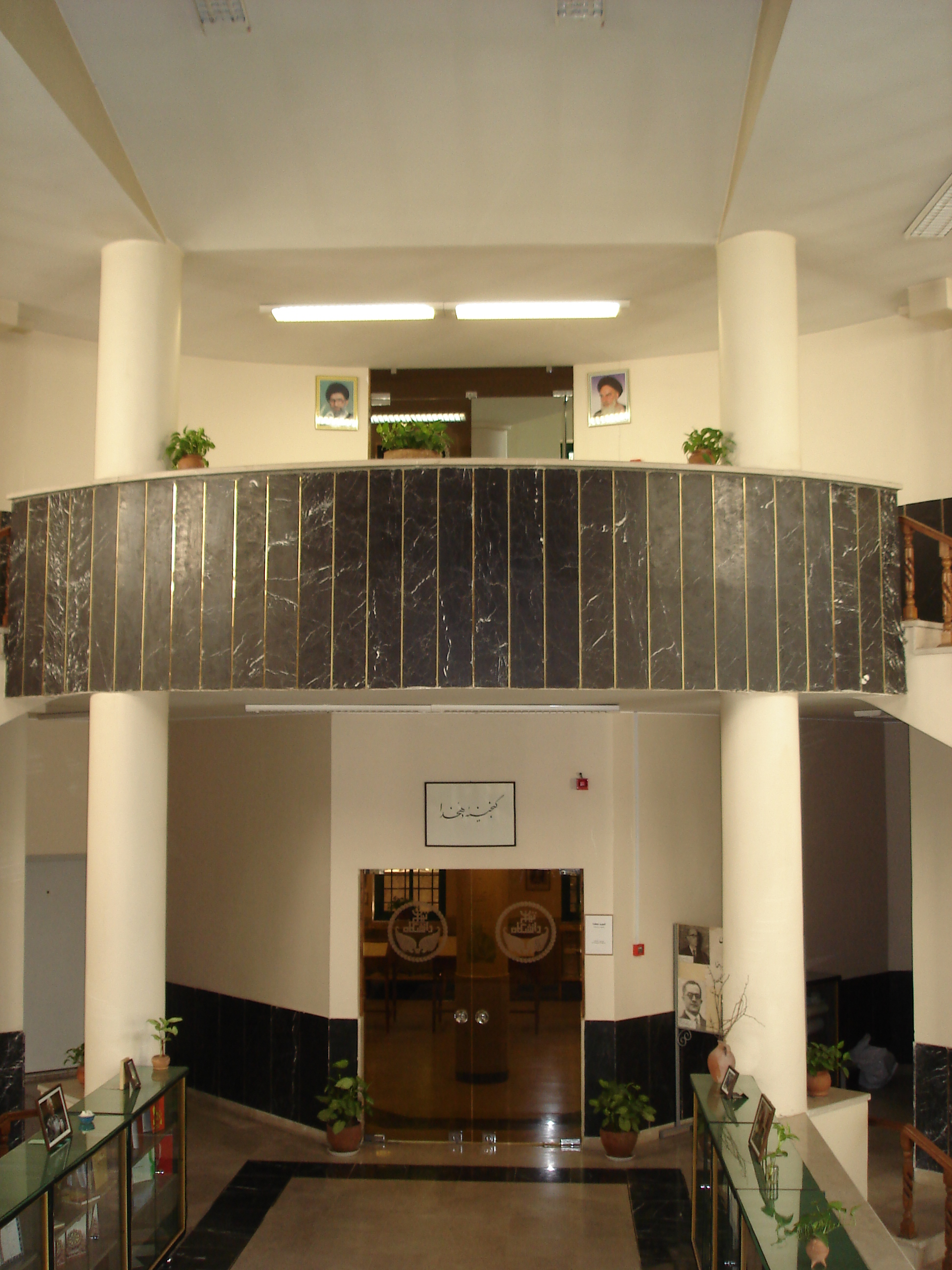
Library of Dehkhoda Institute

== See also ==
- Dehkhoda Dictionary
