= Zarjoob =

Zarjoob River
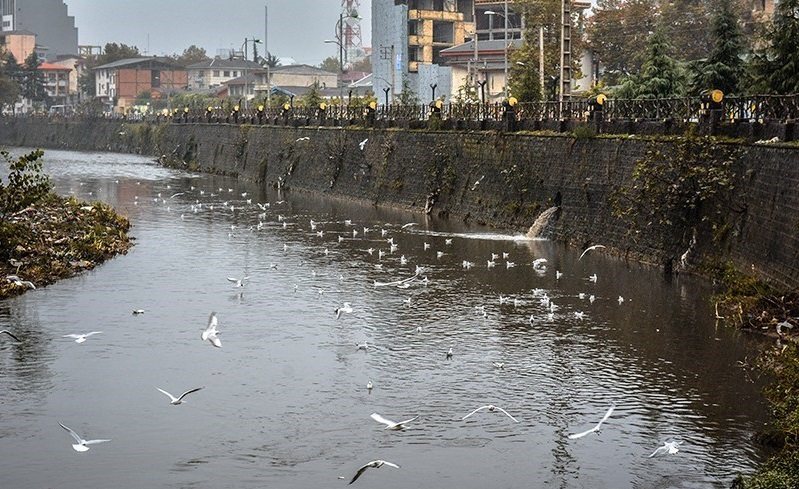

- Location of mouth in Iran
- Native name: زرجوب (Persian)

Location
- Country: Iran
- Province: Gilan

Physical characteristics
- Length: 41 km (25 mi)
- Discharge
  - location: Anzali Lagoon

Zarjoob or Zarjoub (Persian: زرجوب), in Gilan province, northern Iran, is a 41 km river that passes through the city of Rasht and empties into the Anzali Lagoon near the city of Bandar-e Anzali on the Caspian Sea.

== Pollution ==
Despite its short length, the Zarjoob watershed is home to about 1 million people and the river is heavily polluted. Sources of pollution include leaching from a landfill that receives some 700 tons of waste per day, approximately 500 factories, domestic and hospital wastewater, and agricultural runoff from rice paddies.

== See also ==
- Tributaries of the Caspian Sea
