= Shtokavian =

Prestige dialect of the pluricentric Serbo-Croatian language

- štokavski / штокавски
- Native to: Bosnia and Herzegovina, Croatia, Kosovo, Montenegro, Serbia
- Language family: Indo-European: Balto-Slavic; Slavic; South Slavic; Western South Slavic; Shtokavian
- Standard forms: Bosnian; Croatian; Montenegrin; Serbian
- Dialects: Eastern Herzegovinian; Eastern Bosnian; Šumadija–Vojvodina; Younger Ikavian; Kosovo–Resava; Smederevo–Vršac; Zeta–Raška; Slavonian; Prizren–Timok

Language codes
- ISO 639-3: –
- Glottolog: shto1241
- Linguasphere: 53-AAA-ga to -gf & 53-AAA-gi (-gia to -gii)

Shtokavian or Štokavian (/ʃtɒˈkɑːviən, -ˈkæv-/; Serbo-Croatian Latin: štokavski / Serbo-Croatian Cyrillic: штокавски, pronounced [ʃtǒːkaʋskiː]) is the prestige supradialect of the pluricentric Serbo-Croatian language and the basis of its Bosnian, Croatian, Montenegrin, and Serbian standards. It is a part of the South Slavic dialect continuum. Its name comes from the form for the interrogative pronoun for "what": što. This is in contrast to macrodialects that are exclusive to Croatia: Kajkavian and Chakavian (kaj and ča also meaning "what").

Shtokavian is spoken in Bosnia and Herzegovina, much of Croatia, Montenegro, and Serbia. The primary subdivisions of Shtokavian are based on three principles: one is different accents (whether the subdialect is Old-Shtokavian or Neo-Shtokavian); second is the way the old Slavic phoneme yat has changed (Ikavian, Ijekavian or Ekavian); and third is the presence of the Young Proto-Slavic isogloss (Schakavian or Shtakavian). Modern dialectology generally recognizes seven Shtokavian subdialects.

== Early history ==
The early medieval Slavs who later spoke various Bulgarian and Serbo-Croatian dialects migrated across Moldavia and Pannonia. According to linguist Frederik Kortlandt, the shared innovations originate from a "Trans-Carpathian" homeland, and by the 4th and 6th century, "the major dialect divisions of Slavic were already established". Dialectologists and Slavists maintain that when the separation of Western South Slavic speeches happened, they separated into five divergent groups: more specifically two, with one being Slovene and a second Serbo-Croatian with four divergent groups – Kajkavian, Chakavian, Western Shtokavian and Eastern Shtokavian. The latter group can be additionally divided into a first (Kajkavian, Chakavian, Western Shtokavian) and second (Eastern Shtokavian, Torlakian).

As noted by linguist Ranko Matasović, "the Shtokavian dialect [...] was from the earliest times very non-unique, with the Western Shtokavian dialects leaning towards Kajkavian, and the Eastern Shtokavian to Torlakian". According to isoglosses, and the presumed end of existence of the common Southwestern Slavic language around the 8th–9th century, the formation of the Proto-Western Shtokavian and Proto-Eastern Shtokavian linguistic and territorial unit would be around the 9th–10th century: Proto-Western Shtokavian was closer to Proto-Chakavian, while Proto-Eastern Shtokavian shared an old isogloss with Bulgarian.

According to historian Ivo Banac, in the area of today's Slavonia, Bosnia and Herzegovina (west of Brčko, Vlasenica and Neretva line), and on the littoral between the Bay of Kotor and Cetina, medieval Croats spoke an old West Shtokavian dialect. Some believe the West Shtokavian dialect stemmed from Chakavian, while medieval Serbs spoke two dialects: old East Shtokavian and Torlakian. Many linguists noted a close connection between Chakavian and Western Shtokavian; for example, Pavle Ivić saw Chakavian as an archaic peripheral zone of Shtokavian, while Dalibor Brozović saw the majority of Chakavian dialects as derived from the same accentological core as Western Shtokavian. Western Shtokavian was principally characterized by a three-accent system, whereas Eastern Shtokavian was mostly marked by a two-accent system.

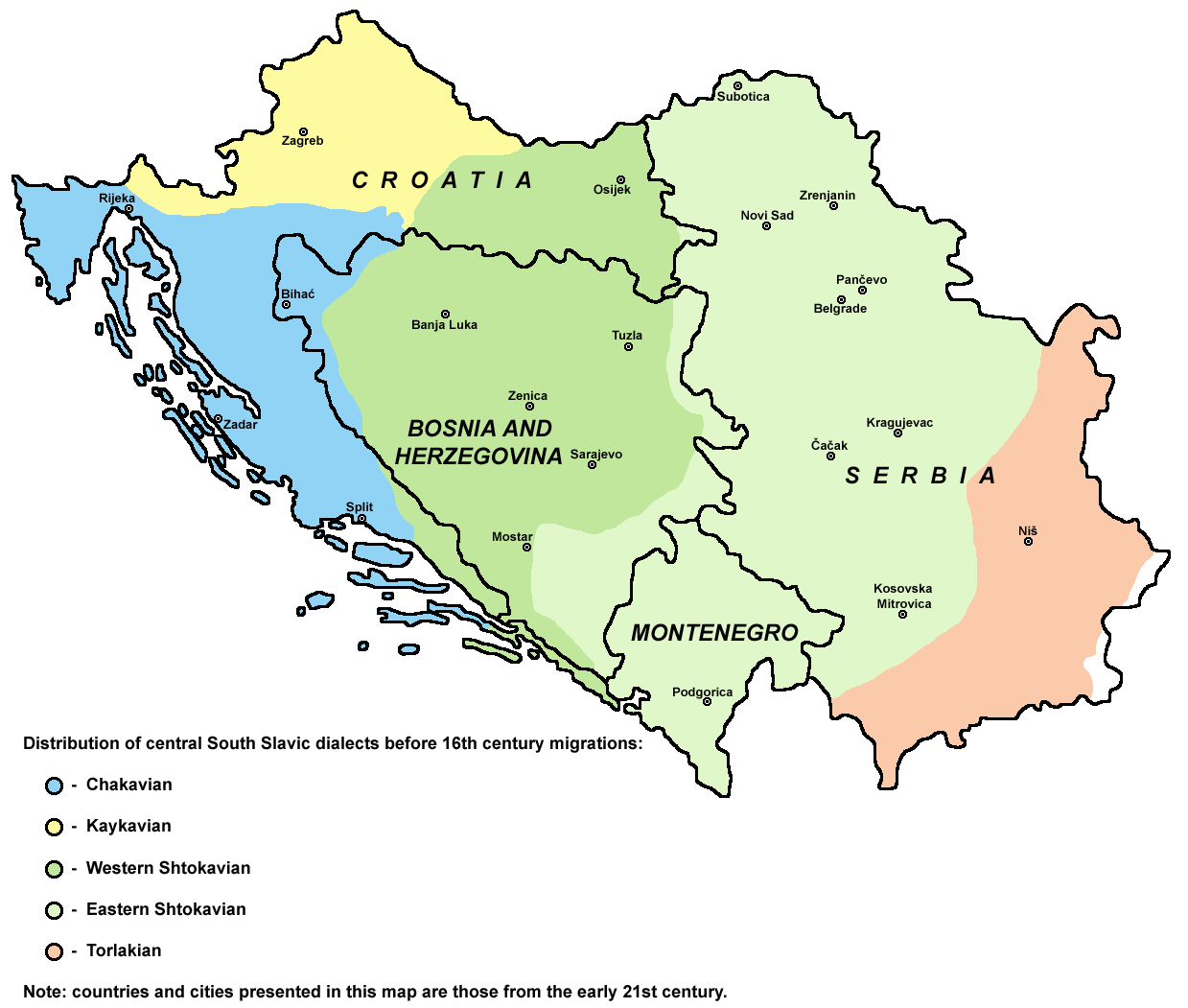
Map of Serbo-Croatian dialects prior to the 16th-century migrations

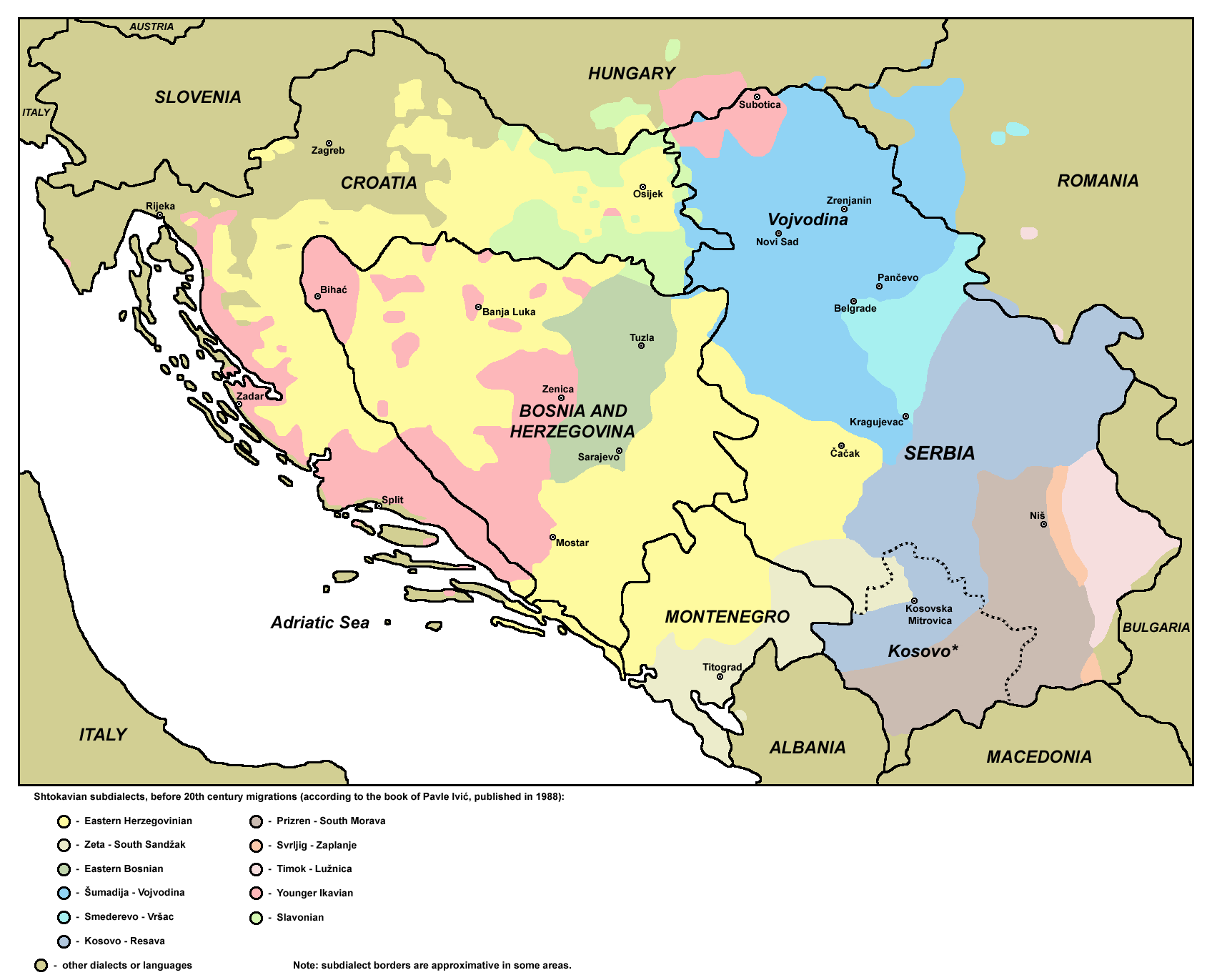
Map of Shtokavian subdialects prior to the 20th-century migrations

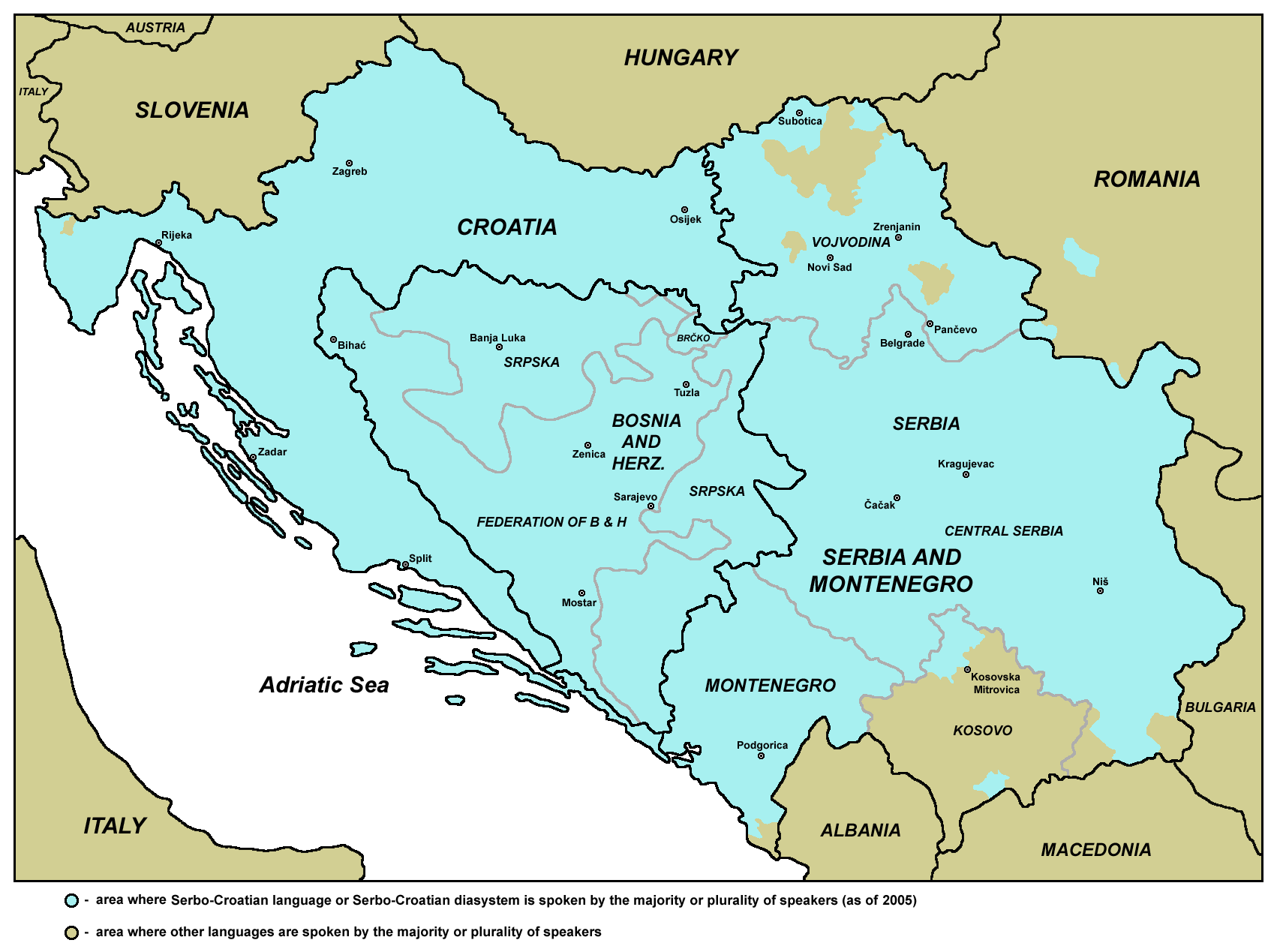
Area where Shtokavian standard languages are spoken by the majority or plurality of population, 2005

Western Shtokavian covered the major part of present-day Bosnia and Herzegovina, Slavonia, and part of Southern Dalmatia in Croatia. Eastern Shtokavian was dominant in Serbia, easternmost Bosnia and Herzegovina, and greater parts of Montenegro. From the 12th century, both dialects started separating further from Chakavian and Kajkavian idioms. According to research of historical linguistics, Old-Shtokavian was well established by the mid-15th century. In this period, it was still mixed with Church Slavonic to varying degrees.

However, the ultimate development of Western Shtokavian and Eastern Shtokavian was not divergent (like in the case of Chakavian and Kajkavian), but convergent. It was the result of migrations (particularly of Neoshtokavian-Eastern Shtokavian speakers), political-cultural border changes, and also caused by the Ottoman invasion (since the 16th century). Two initially separate proto-idioms started to resemble each other so greatly that, according to Brozović, "[today] we can no longer speak of an independent Western Shtokavian, but only about the better or weaker preservation of former West Shtokavian features in some dialects of the unique Shtokavian group of dialects".

Originally, the Shtokavian dialect covered a significantly smaller area than it covers today (see image "Map...prior to 20th-century migrations"), meaning that the Shtokavian speech has spread for the last five centuries, overwhelmingly at the expense of Chakavian and Kajkavian idioms. The modern areal distribution of these three dialects, as well as their internal stratification (Shtokavian and Chakavian in particular), is primarily a result of the migrations due to the spread of the Ottoman Empire in the Balkans. Migratory waves were particularly strong in the 16th–18th century, bringing about large-scale linguistic and ethnic changes in the Central South Slavic area (see also Great Migrations of the Serbs).

By far the most numerous, mobile, and expansionist migrations were those of Ijekavian-Shtokavian speakers of eastern Herzegovina, who have spread into most of Western Serbia, many areas of eastern and western Bosnia, and large swathes of Croatia (Banovina, Kordun, Lika, parts of Gorski kotar, continental parts of northern Dalmatia, some places north of Kupa, parts of Slavonia, southeastern Baranya etc.). This is the reason Eastern Herzegovinian is the most spoken Serbo-Croatian dialect today, and why its name is only descriptive of its area of origin. These migrations also played a pivotal role in the spread of Neo-Shtokavian innovations.

=== Earliest texts of Shtokavian dialect ===
Proto-Shtokavian, or Church Slavic with elements of nascent Shtokavian, were recorded in legal documents like the charter of Ban Kulin, regulating the commerce between Bosnia and Dubrovnik in Croatia, dated 1189, and in liturgical texts like Gršković's and Mihanović's fragments, c. 1150, in southern Bosnia or Herzegovina. Experts' opinions are divided with regard to the extent to which these texts, especially the Kulin ban parchment, contain contemporary Shtokavian vernacular.

Numerous legal and commercial documents from pre-Ottoman Bosnia, Hum, Serbia, Zeta, and southern Dalmatia, especially Dubrovnik, are mainly Shtokavian, with elements of Church Slavic. The first major comprehensive vernacular Shtokavian text is the Vatican Croatian Prayer Book, written in Dubrovnik a decade or two before 1400. In the next two centuries, Shtokavian vernacular texts had been written mainly in Dubrovnik, other Adriatic cities and islands influenced by Dubrovnik, as well as in Bosnia, by Bosnian Franciscans and Bosnian Muslim vernacular aljamiado literature – the first example being "Chirvat-türkisi" ("Croatian song"), dated 1589.

== Relationship with neighboring dialects ==
Shtokavian has a number of characteristic historical sound changes, accentual changes, changes in inflection, morphology and syntax. Some of these isoglosses are not exclusive and have also been shared by neighboring dialects, and some of them have mostly but not completely spread over the whole Shtokavian area. The differences between Shtokavian and the unrelated, neighboring Bulgarian–Macedonian dialects are mostly clear-cut, whereas the differences with the related Serbo-Croatian dialects of Chakavian and Kajkavian are much more fluid, and the mutual influence of various subdialects plays a more prominent role.

The main bundle of isoglosses separates Slovenian and Kajkavian on the one hand from Shtokavian and Chakavian on the other. These are:

- long falling accent of newer origin (neocircumflex)
- development of the consonant group rj (as opposed to consonant /r/) from former soft /r'/ before a vowel (e.g., morjem, zorja)
- reflexes of /o/ or /ọ/ of the old Common Slavic nasal vowel /ǫ/, and not /u/
- inflectional morpheme -o (as opposed to -ojo) in the instrumental singular of a-declension

Other characteristics distinguishing Kajkavian from Shtokavian, beside the demonstrative/interrogatory pronoun kaj (as opposed to što/šta used in Shtokavian), are:

- a reflex of old semivowels of /ẹ/ (e.g. dẹn < Common Slavic *dьnь, pẹs < Common Slavic *pьsъ); closed /ẹ/ appearing also as a jat reflex
- retention of word-final -l (e.g. došel, as opposed to Shtokavian došao)
- word-initial u- becoming v- (e.g. vuho, vuzel, vozek)
- dephonemicization of affricates /č/ and /ć/ to some form of middle value
- genitive plural of masculine nouns has the morpheme -of / -ef
- syncretized dative, locative and instrumental plural has the ending -ami
- the ending -me in the first-person plural present (e.g. vidime)
- affix š in the formation of adjectival comparatives (e.g. debleši, slabeši)
- supine
- future tense formation in the form of bom/bum došel, došla, došlo

Characteristics distinguishing Chakavian from Shtokavian, beside the demonstrative/interrogatory pronoun ča, are:

- preservation of polytonic three-accent system
- vocalization of weak jers in word-initial syllables (e.g. malin/melin < Common Slavic *mъlinъ; cf. Shtokavian mlin)
- vowel /a/ as opposed to /e/ after palatal consonants /j/, /č/, /ž/ (e.g. Čk. jazik/zajik: Št. jezik, Čk. počati: Št. početi, Čk. žaja: Št. želja)
- the appearance of extremely palatal /t'/ or /ć'/ (< earlier /t'/) and /j/ (< earlier /d'/) either in free positions or in groups št', žd'
- depalatalization of /n'/ and /l'/
- /ž/ instead of /dʒ/ (cf. Čk. žep: Št. džep)
- /č/ > /š/ before consonants (cf. Čk. maška: Št. mačka)
- word-initial consonant groups čr-, čri-, čre- (cf. Čk. črivo/črevo: Št. cr(ij)evo, Čk. črn: Št. crn)
- conditional mood with biš in the second-person singular
- non-syncretized dative, locative and instrumental plural

== General characteristics ==
General characteristics of Shtokavian are the following:

- što or šta as the demonstrative/interrogative pronoun
- differentiation between two short (in addition to two or three long) accents, rising and falling, though not in all Shtokavian speakers
- preservation of unaccented length, but not consistently across all speeches
- /u/ as the reflex of Common Slavic back nasal vowel /ǫ/ as well as the syllabic /l/ (with the exception of central Bosnia where a diphthongal /uo/ is also recorded as a reflex)
- initial group of v- + weak semivowel yields u- (e.g. unuk < Common Slavic *vъnukъ)
- schwa resulting from the jer merger yields /a/, with the exception of the Zeta–Raška dialect
- metathesis of vьse to sve
- čr- > cr-, with the exception of Slavonian, Molise and Vlah oasis-Burgenland dialect
- word-final -l changes to /o/ or /a/; the exception is the verbal adjective in the Slavonian southwest
- ď > /dʑ/ ⟨đ⟩ with numerous exceptions
- cr > tr in the word trešnja ("cherry"); some exceptions in Slavonia, Hungary and Romania
- ć and đ from jt, jd (e.g. poći, pođem); exceptions in Slavonian and Eastern Bosnian dialect
- so-called "new iotation" of dentals and labials, with many exceptions, especially in Slavonia and Bosnia
- general loss of phoneme /x/, with many exceptions
- ending -ā in genitive plural of masculine and feminine nouns, with many exceptions
- ending -u in locative singular of masculine and neuter nouns (e.g. u gradu, u m(j)estu)
- augment -ov- / -ev- in the plural of most monosyllabic masculine nouns, with many exceptions (e.g. in the area between Neretva and Dubrovnik)
- syncretism of dative, locative and instrumental plural of nouns, with many exceptions
- preservation of ending -og(a) in genitive and accusative singular of masculine and neuter gender if pronominal-adjectival declension (e.g., drugoga), with exceptions on the area of Dubrovnik and Livno
- special form with the ending -a for the neuter gender in nominative plural of pronominal-adjectival declension (e.g. ova m(j)esta and no ove m(j)esta)
- preservation of aorist, which is however missing in some areas (e.g., around Dubrovnik)
- special constructs reflecting old dual for numerals 2–4 (dva, tri, četiri stola)
- many so-called "Turkisms" (turcizmi) or "Orientalisms", i.e. words borrowed from Ottoman Turkish

As can be seen from the list, many of these isoglosses are missing from particular Shtokavian idioms, just as many of them are shared with neighboring non-Shtokavian dialects.

There exist three main criteria for the division of Shtokavian dialects:

1. Accentuation ("Old-Shtokavian" and "Neo-Shtokavian"; see section below)
2. Yat reflex ("Ikavian", "Ijekavian", "Ekavian"; see section below)
3. Young Proto-Slavic (600–750 AD) palatal consonant isogloss: *šć-*žƷ (Šćakavski - Schakavian; "Western Shtokavian" including Slavonian, Eastern Bosnian and transitory Western ikavian dialect) and *št & *žd (Štakaviski - Shtakavian; "Eastern Shtokavian" including Eastern Herzegovinian-Krajina, Šumadija–Vojvodina, Kosovo–Resava, Zeta–Raška dialect). The isogloss developed between 7th and 8/9th century, and the former relates those dialects with Chakavian and Kajkavian, while the latter relates those dialects with Bulgarian.

== Accentuation ==
The Shtokavian dialect is divided into Old-Shtokavian and Neo-Shtokavian subdialects. The primary distinction is the accentuation system: although there are variations, "old" dialects preserve the older accent system, which consists of two types of falling (dynamic) accents, one long and one short, and unstressed syllables, which can be long and short. Both long and short unstressed syllables could precede the stressed syllables. Stress placement is free and mobile in paradigms.

In the process known as "Neo-Shtokavian metatony" or "retraction", length of the old syllables was preserved, but their quality changed. Stress (intensity) on the inner syllables moved to the preceding syllable, but they kept the high pitch. That process produced the "rising" accents characteristic for Neo-Shtokavian, and yielded the modern four-tone system. Stress on the initial syllables remained the same in quality and pitch.

Most speakers of Shtokavian, native or taught, from Serbia and Croatia do not distinguish between short rising and short falling tones. They also pronounce most unstressed long vowels as short, with some exceptions, such as genitive plural endings.

Notation used for Shtokavian accents
Description	IPA	Traditional	Diacritic
unstressed short	[e]	e	–
unstressed long	eː	ē	macron
short rising	ě	è	Grave
long rising	ěː	é	Acute
short falling	ê	ȅ	Double grave
long falling	êː	ȇ	Inverted breve

The following table shows the examples of Neo-Shtokavian retraction:

Old stress		New stress		Note
IPA	Trad.	IPA	Trad.	Note
kûtɕa	kȕća	kûtɕa	kȕća	No retraction from the first syllable
prâːvda	prȃvda	prâːvda	prȃvda	No retraction from the first syllable
livâda	livȁda	lǐvada	lìvada	Retraction from short to short syllable → short rising
junâːk	junȃk	jǔnaːk	jùnāk	Retraction from long to short syllable → short rising + unstressed length
priːlîka	prīlȉka	prǐːlika	prílika	Retraction from short to long syllable → long rising
ʒīːvîːm	žīvȋm	ʒǐːviːm	žívīm	Retraction from long to long syllable → long rising + unstressed length

As a result of this process, the following set of rules emerged, which are still in effect in all standard variants of Serbo-Croatian:

- Falling accents may only occur word-initially (otherwise it would have been retracted).
- Rising accents may occur anywhere except word-finally.
  - Thus, monosyllabic words may only have falling accent.
- Unstressed length may only appear after a stressed syllable.

In practice, the influx of foreign words and formation of compound words have loosened these rules, especially in spoken idioms (e.g. paradȁjz, asistȅnt, poljoprȉvreda), but they are maintained in standard language and dictionaries.

== Classification ==
=== Old-Shtokavian dialects ===
==== Prizren–Timok (Torlak) ====
The transitional dialects stretch southwest from the Timok Valley near the Bulgarian border to Prizren. There is disagreement among linguists whether these dialects belong to the Shtokavian area, because there are many other morphological characteristics apart from rendering of što (also, some dialects use kakvo or kvo, typical for Bulgarian) that would place them into a "transitional" group between Shtokavian and Eastern South Slavic languages (Bulgarian and Macedonian).

The Timok–Prizren group falls to the Balkan sprachbund: declension has all but disappeared, the infinitive has given way to subjunctives da-constructions, and adjectives are compared exclusively with prefixes. The accent in the dialect group is a stress accent, and it falls on any syllable in the word. The old semi-vowel has been retained throughout. The vocalic l has been retained (vlk = vuk), and some dialects don't distinguish ć/č and đ/dž by preferring the latter, postalveolar variants. Some subdialects preserve l at the end of words (where otherwise it has developed into a short o) – došl, znal, etc. (cf. Kajkavian and Bulgarian); in others, this l has become the syllable ja.

Torlak is spoken in Kosovo (around Prizren, Gnjilane, and Štrpce), in Southern Serbia, in the part of Toplica Valley around Prokuplje, in Nišava Valley around Pirot, and Timok Valley ending up with the area around Zaječar, where the Kosovo–Resava dialect becomes more dominant. A few centuries ago, before settlers from Kosovo brought the Kosovo–Resava dialect to Eastern Serbia (to the Bor and Negotin areas), Torlak dialects had been overwhelmingly represented in this region.

==== Slavonian ====
Also called the Archaic Šćakavian, it is spoken by Croats who live in some parts of Slavonia, Bačka, Baranja, Syrmia, in Croatia and Serbia, as well as in northern Bosnia. It is divided into two subdialects: southern (Posavian / posavski) and northern (Podravian / podravski). The Slavonian dialect has mixed Ikavian and Ekavian pronunciations. Ikavian accent is predominant in the Posavina, Baranja, Bačka, and in the Slavonian subdialect enclave of Derventa, whereas Ekavian accent is predominant in Podravina.

There are enclaves of one accent in the territory of the other, as well as mixed Ekavian–Ikavian and Jekavian–Ikavian areas. In some villages in Hungary, the original yat is preserved. Local variants can widely differ in the degree of Neo-Shtokavian influences. In two villages in Posavina, Siče and Magića Male, the l, as in the verb nosil, has been retained in place of the modern nosio. In some villages in the Podravina, čr is preserved instead of the usual cr, for example in črn instead of crn. Both forms are usual in Kajkavian but very rare in Shtokavian.

==== Eastern Bosnian ====
Also called Jekavian-Šćakavian, Eastern Bosnian dialect has Jekavian pronunciations in the vast majority of local forms. It is spoken by the majority of Bosniaks living in that area which includes the bigger Bosnian cities Sarajevo, Tuzla, and Zenica, and by most Croats living in that area (Vareš, Usora, etc.). Together with basic Jekavian pronunciation, mixed pronunciations exist in Tešanj and Maglaj dete–djeteta (Ekavian–Jekavian) and around Žepče and Jablanica djete–diteta (Jekavian–ikavian). In the central area of the subdialect, the diphthong uo exists in some words instead of the archaic l and more common u like vuok or stuop, instead of the standard modern vuk and stup.

==== Zeta–Raška ====
Also known as Đekavian-Ijekavian, it is spoken in eastern half of Montenegro and in eastern Raška in Serbia. Its speakers are Serbs, Montenegrins, Bosniaks, and ethnic Muslims. Together with the dominant Ijekavian pronunciation, mixed pronunciations like djete–deteta (Jekavian–Ekavian) around Novi Pazar and Bijelo Polje, dijete–đeteta (Ijekavian–Jekavian) around Podgorica and dete–đeteta (Ekavian–Jekavian) in the village of Mrkojevići in southern Montenegro. Mrkojevići are also characterised by retention of čr instead of cr as in the previously mentioned villages in Podravina.

Some vernaculars have a very open /ɛ/ or /æ/ as their reflex of ь/ъ, which is rare in other Shtokavian vernaculars (sæn and dæn instead of san and dan). Other phonetic features include sounds like ʑ in iʑesti instead of izjesti, ɕ as in ɕekira instead of sjekira. However, these sounds are known also to many in East Herzegovina, like those in Konavle, and are not Zeta–Raška specific. There is a loss of the /v/ sound apparent, seen in čo'ek or đa'ola. The loss of distinction between /ʎ/ and /l/ in some vernaculars is based on a substratum. The word pljesma is a hypercorrection (instead of pjesma) because many vernaculars have changed lj to j.

All verbs in infinitive finish with "t" (example: pjevat 'sing'). This feature is also present in most vernaculars of East Herzegovinian, and actually almost all Serbian and Croatian vernaculars.

The group a + o gave ā /aː/ (kā instead of kao, rekā for rekao), like in other seaside vernaculars. Elsewhere, ao > ō is more common.

==== Kosovo–Resava ====
Also called Older Ekavian, this dialect is spoken by Serbs, mostly in western and northeastern Kosovo (around Mitrovica and in Serb ethnic enclaves of Goraždevac and Osojane near Peja), in Ibar Valley up to Kraljevo, around Kruševac, Trstenik, and in Župa, in the part of Toplica Valley around (Kuršumlija), in the Morava Valley (Jagodina, Ćuprija, Paraćin, Lapovo), in Resava Valley (Svilajnac, Despotovac) and eastern Serbia (Požarevac, Bor, Majdanpek, Negotin). This dialect can be also found in parts of Banatska Klisura (Clisura Dunării) in Romania and in places where Romanian Serbs live (left bank of the Danube).

Substitution of jat is predominantly Ekavian accent, even on the end of datives (žene instead of ženi), in pronouns (teh instead of tih), in comparatives (dobrej instead of dobriji) in the negative of biti (nesam instead of nisam); in Smederevo–Vršac dialects, Ikavian forms can be found (di si instead of gde si?). Smederevo–Vršac dialect (spoken in northeastern Šumadija, Lower Great Morava Valley and Banat) is sometimes classified as a subdialect of the Kosovo–Resava dialect, but it is also considered to be a separate dialect as it the represents mixed speech of Šumadija–Vojvodina and Kosovo–Resava dialects.

=== Neo-Shtokavian dialects ===
==== Younger Ikavian ====
Also called Western Ikavian, the majority of its speakers are Croats who live in Lika, Kvarner, Dalmatia, Herzegovina, and in north Bačka around Subotica in Serbia and south Bács-Kiskun of Hungary, and in Molise in Italy. The minority speakers of it include Bosniaks in western Bosnia, mostly around the city of Bihać, and also in central Bosnia where Croats and Bosniaks (e.g. Travnik, Jajce, Bugojno, Vitez) used to speak this dialect. Exclusive to the Ikavian accent, Bosnian and Herzegovinian forms use o in verb participle, whereas those in Dalmatia and Lika use -ija or ia like in vidija/vidia. A local form of Bačka was proposed as the base for the Danubian branch of the Bunjevac dialect of Bunjevac Croats (Bunjevci) in Vojvodina, Serbia.

==== Šumadija–Vojvodina ====
Also known as Younger Ekavian, this dialect is one of the bases for the standard Serbian language. It is spoken by Serbs across most of Vojvodina (excluding easternmost parts around Vršac), the wider Belgrade region, western half of Šumadija, Kolubara, Mačva, and in majority ethnic Serb areas in eastern Croatia around the town of Vukovar. It is predominately Ekavian (Ikavian forms are of morphophonological origin). Most Vojvodina dialects and some dialects in Šumadija have an open e and o. However the vernaculars of western Serbia, and in past to them connected vernaculars of (old) Belgrade and southwestern Banat (Borča, Pančevo, Bavanište) are as close to the standard as a vernacular can be. The dialect presents a base for the Ekavian variant of the Serbian standard language.

==== Eastern Herzegovinian ====
Also called Eastern Herzegovinian or Neo-Ijekavian, it encompasses by far the largest area and number of speakers of all Shtokavian dialects. It is the dialectal basis of the standard literary Croatian, Bosnian, Serbian, and Montenegrin languages.

A specific idiom which is often grouped with Eastern Herzegovinian is Dubrovnik subdialect. Also known as Western Ijekavian, in earlier centuries, this subdialect was an independent subdialect of Western Shtokavian dialect. After migrations and Neo-Shtokavisation, it preserved features (like accent, vowels, morphology etc.) which are different to Eastern Herzegovinian. It has a mixed Shtokavian and Chakavian vocabulary, with some words from Dalmatian, older Venetian, and modern Italian.

Micro groups:

- western Montenegro – spoken south Ijekavian variant.
- Croats western Ijekavian variant micro groups in region Slavonia, Banovina, Kordun, Žumberak, Neretva, East Herzegovina (Ravno, Stolac, Buna, Neum), wider Dubrovnik region, and is the basis of the Croatian standard. Cities and towns: Osijek, Bjelovar, Daruvar, Sisak, Pakrac, Petrinja, Dubrovnik, and Metković.
- Serbs east Ijekavian variant groups; East Bosnia, East Herzegovina (Trebinje, Nevesinje, Bileća), Bosanska Krajina, southwestern Serbia and Podrinje (Užice, Čačak, Ivanjica, Loznica, Priboj, Prijepolje). Cities and towns: Trebinje, Bijeljina, Banja Luka, Prijedor, Istočno Sarajevo.
- Its south-eastern form is characterised by the total lack of /x/ sound that is sometimes not only left out or replaced by more common /j/ or /v/ but is replaced as well by less common /k/ and /ɡ/ (bijak, bijaku imperfect of verb biti). Local forms in the Žumberak enclave and around Dubrovnik or Slunj have some special Croatian features, influenced from Chakavian and the western subdialect, whereas forms in Bjelovar or Pakrac are influenced from Kajkavian.

== Yat reflexes ==
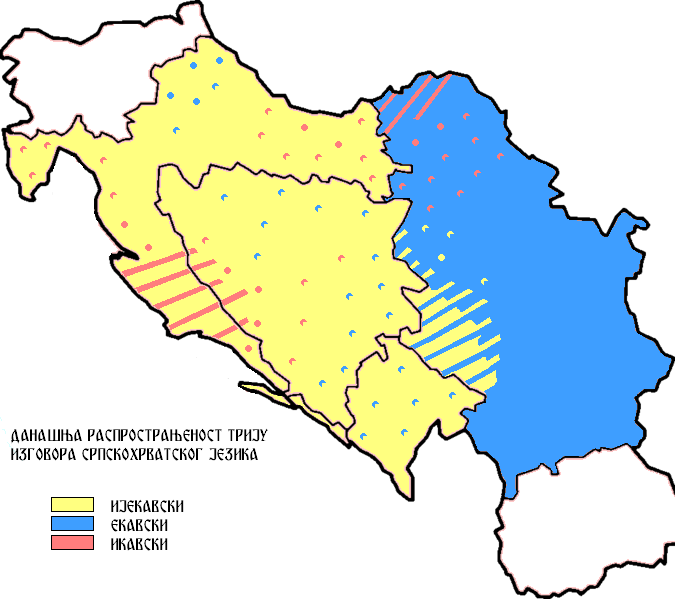
Map of yat pronunciations: Ijekavian Ekavian Ikavian

The Proto-Slavic vowel jat (ѣ in Cyrillic or ě in Latin) has changed over time, coming to be pronounced differently in different areas. These different reflexes define three "pronunciations" (izgovori) of Shtokavian:

- in Ekavian pronunciation (ekavski [ěːkaʋskiː]), jat has conflated into the vowel e
- in Ikavian pronunciation (ikavski [ǐːkaʋskiː]), it has conflated into the vowel i
- in Ijekavian or Jekavian pronunciation (ijekavski [ijěːkaʋskiː] or jekavski [jěːkaʋskiː]), it has come to be pronounced ije or je, depending on whether the vowel was long or short. In standard Croatian, pronunciation is always Jekavian: when yat is short then it is [je] (written as je), and when yat is long then it is [jeː] (written as ije).

Historically, the yat reflexes had been inscribed in Church Slavic texts before the significant development of Shtokavian dialect, reflecting the beginnings of the formative period of the vernacular. In early documents, it is predominantly Church Slavic of the Serbian or Croatian recension (variant). The first undoubted Ekavian reflex (beše 'it was') is found in a document from Serbia dated 1289; the first Ikavian reflex (svidoci 'witnesses') in Bosnia in 1331; and first Ijekavian reflex (želijemo 'we wish', a "hyper-Ijekavism") in Croatia in 1399. Partial attestation can be found in earlier texts (for instance, Ikavian pronunciation is found in a few Bosnian documents from the latter half of the 13th century), but philologists generally accept the aforementioned dates.

In the second half of the 20th century, many vernaculars with unsubstituted yat are found. The intrusion of the vernacular into Church Slavic grew in time to be finally replaced by the vernacular idiom. This process took place for Croats, Serbs and Bosniaks independently and without mutual interference until the mid-19th century. Historical linguistics, textual analysis and dialectology have dispelled myths about allegedly "unspoilt" vernacular speech of rural areas: for instance, it is established that Bosniaks have retained the phoneme "h" in numerous words (unlike Serbs and Croats), due to elementary religious education based on the Quran, where this phoneme is the carrier of specific semantic value.

The Ekavian pronunciation, sometimes called Eastern, is spoken primarily in Serbia and in small parts of Croatia. The Ikavian pronunciation, sometimes called Western, is spoken in western and central Bosnia, western Herzegovina, some of Slavonia, and the major part of Dalmatia in Croatia. The Ijekavian pronunciation, sometimes called Southern, is spoken in central Croatia, most of Slavonia, southern Dalmatia, most of Bosnia, Herzegovina, Montenegro, as well as some parts of western Serbia. The following are some generic examples:

English	Predecessor	Ekavian	Ikavian	Ijekavian
time	vrěme	vreme	vrime	vrijeme
beautiful	lěp	lep	lip	lijep
girl	děvojka	devojka	divojka	djevojka
true	věran	veran	viran	vjeran
to sit	sědĕti	sedeti (sèdeti)	siditi (sìditi)	sjediti
to grow gray hairs	sěděti	sedeti (sédeti)	siditi (síditi)	sijediti
to heat	grějati	grejati	grijati	grijati

Long ije is pronounced as a single syllable, [jeː], by many Ijekavian speakers, especially in Croatia. However, in Zeta dialect and most of East Herzegovina dialect, it is pronounced as two syllables, [ije], which is the Croatian official standard too, but seldom actually practiced. This distinction can be clearly heard in first verses of national anthems of Croatia and Montenegro—they are sung respectively as "L'je-pa [two syllables] na-ša do-mo-vi-no" and "Oj svi-je-tla [three syllables] maj-ska zo-ro".

The Ikavian pronunciation is the only one that is not part of any standard variety of Serbo-Croatian today, though it was a variant used for a significant literary output between the 15th and 18th centuries. This has led to a reduction in its use and an increase in the use of Ijekavian in traditionally Ikavian areas since the standardization. For example, most people in the formerly fully Ikavian city of Split, Croatia today use both Ikavian and Ijekavian words in everyday speech, without a clearly predictable pattern—usually more emotionally charged or intimate words are Ikavian and more academic, political, generally standardised words Ijekavian, but it is not a straight out rule.

The IETF language tags have assigned the variants sr-ekavsk and sr-ijekavsk to Ekavian and Ijekavian pronunciations, respectively.

== Ethnic affiliation of native speakers ==
During the first half of the 19th century, protagonists of nascent Slavic philology were, as far as South Slavic dialects were concerned, embroiled in frequently bitter polemic about the "ethnic affiliation" of native speakers of various dialects. This contention was motivated primarily by political and national interests that prompted philologists-turned-ideologues to express their views on the subject. The most prominent contenders in the debate, with conflicting agendas, were the Czech philologist Josef Dobrovský, the Slovak Pavel Šafárik, the Slovenes Jernej Kopitar and Franz Miklosich, the Serb Vuk Karadžić, the Croat of Slovak origin Bogoslav Šulek, and the Croatians Vatroslav Jagić and Ante Starčević.

The dispute was primarily concerned with who could, philologically, be labelled as "Slovene", "Croat", and "Serb", with the aim of expanding one's own national territory and influence. Born in the climate of romanticism and national awakening, these polemical battles led to increased tensions between the aforementioned nations, especially because the Shtokavian dialect cannot be split along ethnic lines in an unequivocal manner.

However, contemporary native speakers, after a process of national crystallization and identification had been completed, can be roughly identified as predominant speakers of various Shtokavian subdialects. Because standard languages propagated through media have strongly influenced and altered the situation in the 19th century, the following attribution must be treated with necessary caution.

The distribution of Old-Shtokavian speakers along ethnic lines in present times is as follows:

- Timok–Prizren (Ekavian pronunciation) dialect: Serbs
- Kosovo–Resava (Ekavian pronunciation) dialect: Serbs
- Zeta–Raška dialect (Ijekavian pronunciation): Montenegrins, Bosniaks, and Serbs.
- Slavonian dialect (fluctuating "yat": mainly Ikavian pronunciation, also Ijekavian): Croats
- Eastern Bosnian dialect (Ijekavian pronunciation): Bosniaks and Croats

Generally, the Neo-Shtokavian dialect is divided as follows with regard to the ethnicity of its native speakers:

- Šumadija–Vojvodina dialect (Ekavian pronunciation): Serbs
- Dalmatian–Bosnian dialect (Ikavian pronunciation): Croats and Bosniaks
- Eastern Herzegovinian (Ijekavian pronunciation): Serbs, Montenegrins, Croats, and Bosniaks

Group	Sub-Dialect	Serbian	Croatian	Bosnian	Montenegrin
Old-Shtokavian	Timok–Prizren	x			
Old-Shtokavian	Kosovo–Resava	x			
Old-Shtokavian	Zeta–Raška	x		x	x
Old-Shtokavian	Slavonian		x		
Old-Shtokavian	Eastern Bosnian		x	x	
Neo-Shtokavian	Šumadija–Vojvodina	x			
Neo-Shtokavian	Dalmatian–Bosnian		x	x	
Neo-Shtokavian	Eastern Herzgovinian	x	x	x	x

== Standard language ==
The standard Bosnian, Croatian, Montenegrin, and Serbian variants of the pluricentric Serbo-Croatian standard language are all based on the Neo-Shtokavian dialect. However, it must be stressed that standard variants, irrespectively of their mutual differences, have been stylised in such manners that parts of the Neo-Shtokavian dialect have been retained (for instance, declension) but other features were purposely omitted or altered (for instance, the phoneme "h" was reinstated in the standard language).

Croatian has had a long tradition of Shtokavian vernacular literacy and literature. It took almost four and half centuries for Shtokavian to prevail as the dialectal basis for the Croatian standard. In other periods, Chakavian and Kajkavian dialects, as well as hybrid Chakavian–Kajkavian–Shtokavian interdialects "contended" for the Croatian national koine, but eventually lost: mainly due to historical and political reasons. By the 1650s, it was fairly obvious that Shtokavian would become the dialectal basis for the Croatian standard; however, this process was finally completed in the 1850s, when Neo-Shtokavian Ijekavian, based mainly on Ragusan (Dubrovnik), Dalmatian, Bosnian, and Slavonian literary heritage, became the national standard language.

Serbian was much faster in standardisation. Although vernacular literature was present in the 18th century, it was Vuk Karadžić who, between 1818 and 1851, made a radical break with the past and established Serbian Neo-Shtokavian folklore idiom as the basis of standard Serbian (until then, educated Serbs had been using Serbian Slavic, Russian Slavic and a hybrid Russian–Serbian language). Although he wrote in Serbian Ijekavian accent, the majority of Serbs have adopted Ekavian accent, which is dominant in Serbia. Serbs in Croatia and Bosnia, as well as Montenegrins, use the Ijekavian accent.

Bosnian is only currently beginning to take shape. The Bosniak idiom can be seen as a transition between Serbian Ijekavian and Croatian varieties, with some specific traits. After the breakup of Yugoslavia, Bosniaks affirmed their wish to stylize their own standard language, based on the Neo-Shtokavian dialect, but reflecting their characteristics, from phonetics to semantics.

The contemporary situation is unstable with regard to the accentuation, because phoneticians have observed that the 4-accents speech has, in all likelihood, shown to be increasingly unstable, resulting in proposals that a 3-accents norm be prescribed. This is particularly true for Croatian, where, contrary to expectation, the influence of Chakavian and Kajkavian dialects on the standard language has been increaing rather than decreasing in the past 50–70 years.

The Croatian, Serbian, and Bosnian standard variants, although all based on the East Herzegovinian subdialect of Neo-Shtokavian and mutually intelligible, do differ slightly – as is the case with other pluricentric languages (English, Spanish, German and Portuguese, among others) – but not to a degree which would justify considering them as different languages. Their structures are grammatically and phonologically almost identical, but have differences in vocabulary and semantics:

"Lexical differences between the ethnic variants are extremely limited, even when compared with those between closely related Slavic languages (such as standard Czech and Slovak, Bulgarian and Macedonian), and grammatical differences are even less pronounced. More importantly, complete understanding between the ethnic variants of the standard language makes translation and second language teaching impossible."

In 2017, numerous prominent writers, scientists, journalists, activists and other public figures from Croatia, Bosnia-Herzegovina, Montenegro, and Serbia, signed the Declaration on the Common Language, which states that in Croatia, Bosnia-Herzegovina, Montenegro, and Serbia, a common pluricentric standard language is used, consisting of several standard varieties, similar to the situation in German, English, or Spanish.

== See also ==
- Abstand and ausbau languages
- Language secessionism in Serbo-Croatian
- Pluricentric language
- Mutual intelligibility

== Sources ==
- Alexander, Ronelle (2000). In honor of diversity: the linguistic resources of the Balkans. Kenneth E. Naylor memorial lecture series in South Slavic linguistics; vol. 2. Columbus, Ohio: Ohio State University, Dept. of Slavic and East European Languages and Literatures. OCLC 47186443.
- —— (2006). Bosnian/Croatian/Serbian - A Grammar with Sociolinguistic Commentary. The University of Wisconsin Press. ISBN 978-0-299-21194-3.
- Blum, Daniel (2002). Sprache und Politik : Sprachpolitik und Sprachnationalismus in der Republik Indien und dem sozialistischen Jugoslawien (1945–1991) [Language and Policy: Language Policy and Linguistic Nationalism in the Republic of India and the Socialist Yugoslavia (1945–1991)]. Beiträge zur Südasienforschung; vol. 192 (in German). Würzburg: Ergon. p. 200. ISBN 3-89913-253-X. OCLC 51961066.
- Brozović, Dalibor (1992). Michael Clyne (ed.). Serbo-Croatian as Pluricentric Language, u: Pluricentric Languages. Differing Norms in Different Nations. Berlin-New York: Mouton de Gruyter. pp. 347–380.
- Bunčić, Daniel (2008), "Die (Re-)Nationalisierung der serbokroatischen Standards" [The (Re-)Nationalisation of Serbo-Croatian Standards], in Kempgen, Sebastian (ed.), Deutsche Beiträge zum 14. Internationalen Slavistenkongress, Ohrid, 2008, Welt der Slaven (in German), Munich: Otto Sagner, pp. 89–102, OCLC 238795822
- Crystal, David (1998) [1st pub. 1987], The Cambridge encyclopedia of language, Cambridge, New York: Cambridge University Press, OCLC 300458429
- Gröschel, Bernhard (2009). Das Serbokroatische zwischen Linguistik und Politik: mit einer Bibliographie zum postjugoslavischen Sprachenstreit [Serbo-Croatian Between Linguistics and Politics: With a Bibliography of the Post-Yugoslav Language Dispute]. Lincom Studies in Slavic Linguistics; vol 34 (in German). Munich: Lincom Europa. p. 451. ISBN 978-3-929075-79-3. LCCN 2009473660. OCLC 428012015. OL 15295665W. Inhaltsverzeichnis Archived 2015-09-23 at the Wayback Machine.
- Kapović, Mate (2015). Povijest hrvatske akcentuacije. Fonetika [History of Croatian Accentuation. Phonetics] (in Croatian). Zagreb: Matica hrvatska. ISBN 978-953-150-971-8.
- Kordić, Snježana (2010), Jezik i nacionalizam [Language and Nationalism] (PDF), Rotulus Universitas (in Serbo-Croatian), Zagreb: Durieux, p. 430, ISBN 978-953-188-311-5, LCCN 2011520778, OCLC 729837512, OL 15270636W, CROSBI 475567, archived (PDF) from the original on 1 June 2012
- Kortlandt, Frederik (1982). "Early dialectal diversity in South Slavic I". South Slavic and Balkan Linguistics. Studies in Slavic and General Linguistics. Vol. 2. Editions Rodopi B.V., Brill. pp. 177–192. JSTOR 40996889. Archived from the original on 2023-02-15.
- Kortlandt, Frederik (2003). "Early dialectal diversity in South Slavic II". Dutch Contributions to the Thirteenth International Congress of Slavists. Linguistics. Studies in Slavic and General Linguistics. Vol. 30. Editions Rodopi B.V., Brill. pp. 215–235. JSTOR 40997749. Archived from the original on 2023-02-15.
- Lisac, Josip (2003), Hrvatska dijalektologija 1 – Hrvatski dijalekti i govori štokavskog narječja i hrvatski govori torlačkog narječja, Zagreb: Golden marketing – Tehnička knjiga, ISBN 953-212-168-4
- Lukežić, Iva (1996). "Prilog raspravi o genezi hrvatskih narječja" [A contribution to the treatise of the beginnings of Croatian dialects]. Fluminensia (in Croatian). 8 (1–2): 223–236.
- Matasović, Ranko (2008). Poredbenopovijesna gramatika hrvatskoga jezika [Comparative and historical grammar of Croatian] (in Croatian). Zagreb: Matica hrvatska. ISBN 978-953-150-840-7.
- Okuka, Miloš (2008), Srpski dijalekti, SDK Prosvjeta, ISBN 978-953-7611-06-4
- Pohl, Hans-Dieter (1996), "Serbokroatisch – Rückblick und Ausblick" [Serbo-Croatian – Looking backward and forward], in Ohnheiser, Ingeborg (ed.), Wechselbeziehungen zwischen slawischen Sprachen, Literaturen und Kulturen in Vergangenheit und Gegenwart : Akten der Tagung aus Anlaß des 25jährigen Bestehens des Instituts für Slawistik an der Universität Innsbruck, Innsbruck, 25. – 27. Mai 1995, Innsbrucker Beiträge zur Kulturwissenschaft, Slavica aenipontana; vol. 4 (in German), Innsbruck: Non Lieu, pp. 205–219, OCLC 243829127
- Sussex, Roland; Cubberly, Paul (2006), The Slavic Languages, Cambridge, New York, Melbourne, Madrid, Cape Town, Singapore, São Paulo: Cambridge University Press, ISBN 978-0-521-22315-7
- Pešikan, Mitar (2007), "III. Akcenat i druga pitanja pravilnog govora", Srpski jezički priručnik (IV ed.), Beogradska knjiga, p. 65, ISBN 978-86-7590-169-3
- Zubčić, Sanja (2017). Neocirkumfleks u čakavskom narječju [Neocircumflex in the Čakavian] (PDF) (in Croatian). Rijeka: Filozofski fakultet u Rijeci. ISBN 978-953-7975-50-0. Archived (PDF) from the original on 2023-02-12.
