= Zeta–Raška dialect =

Dialect of Shtokavian supradialect of Serbo-Croatian language

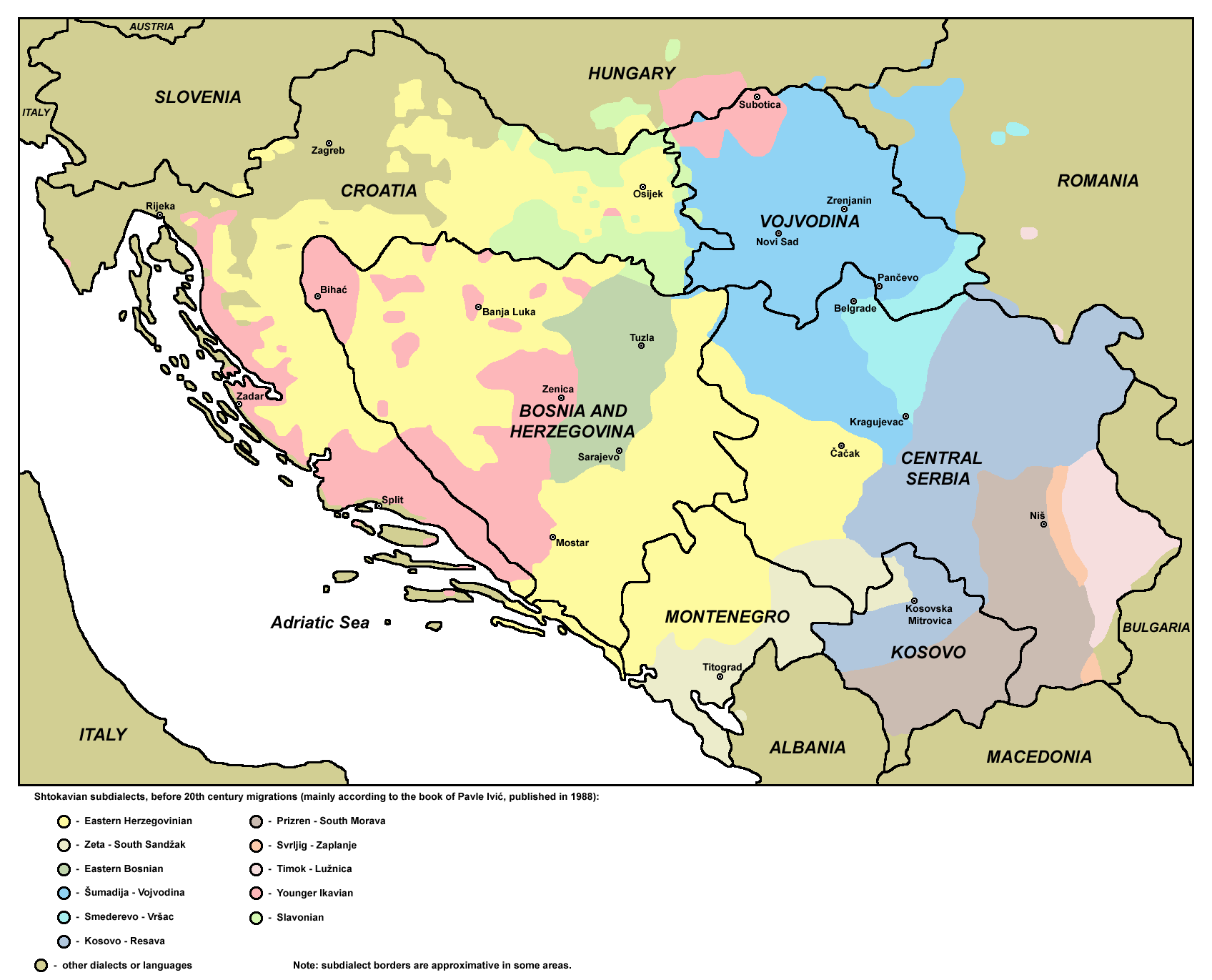
Map of Shtokavian subdialects prior to the 20th-century migrations; Zeta–Raška subdialect area shown in beige

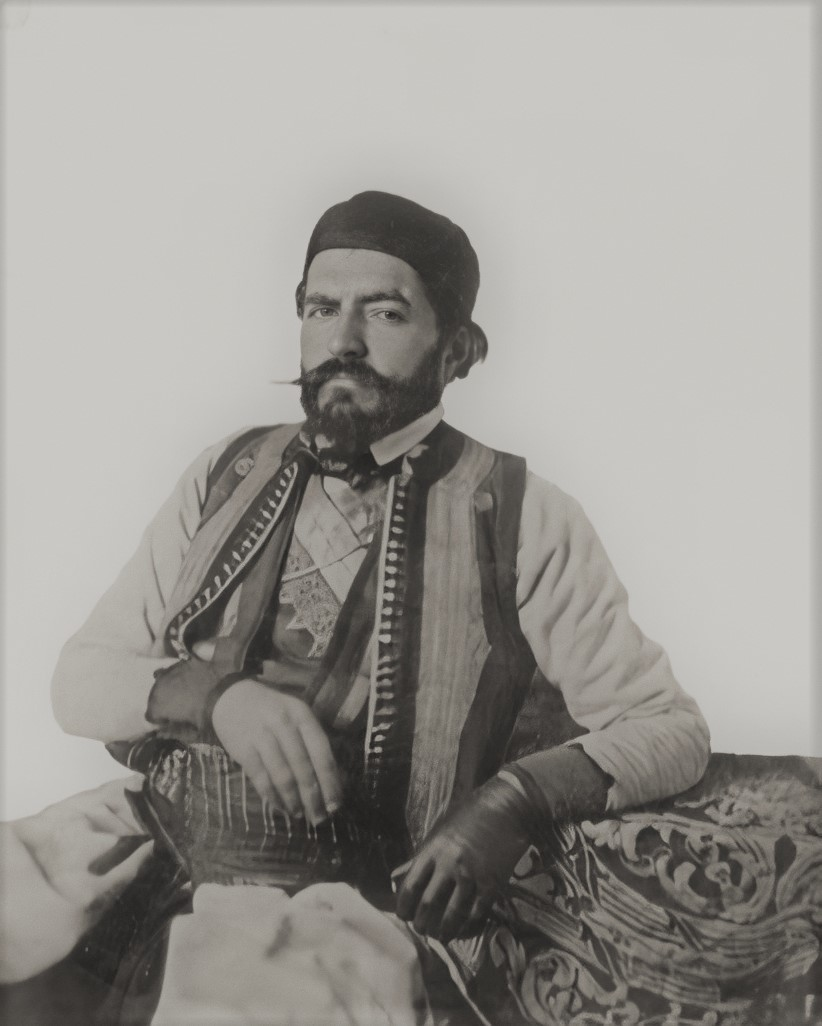
Petar II Petrović-Njegoš wrote his notable poem The Mountain Wreath in his native Zeta-Raška dialect

The Zeta–Raška dialect (Serbo-Croatian: zetsko–raški dijalekt / зетско–рашки дијалект) is a dialect of Shtokavian supradialect of Serbo-Croatian language, dominantly of Ijekavian pronunciation. Its prevalence is mostly in southeastern and northeastern Montenegro and parts of the historical region of Raška in Serbia. It is spoken by local ethnic Serbs, Montenegrins, Bosniaks, and ethnic Muslims.

== Geographical distribution ==
Zeta–Raška dialect is mainly spoken in eastern half of Montenegro and parts of southwestern Serbia of Montenegro. At its westernmost dialect boundary, speakers of the dialect can be found along the Adriatic Sea from Ulcinj at its southernmost point to the town of Perast near Kotor in the north, where it borders with the Eastern Herzegovinian dialect. This border runs roughly northeast toward Grahovo and further east to Kolašin. The border continues northeast toward Bijelo Polje and crosses into Serbia near the town of Brodarevo. The dialect border continues east, just south of Sjenica, into North Kosovo, where it borders the Kosovo–Resava dialect. The Zeta–Raška dialect then veers south toward the vicinity Mitrovica before continuing westward across Mokra Gora and Žljeb back into Montenegro. Upon re-entry into Montenegro, the dialectal border continues through the Prokletije mountains and straddles along the entire Montenegrin border with Albania.

== Characteristics ==
=== -a ending for masculine active past participle ===
In the standard varieties of Serbo-Croatian, certain verbs carry the -ao ending for the active past participle in the masculine gender. However, depending on the speaker, this ending is either contracted to -a (-ā in official Montenegrin orthography) or -ä (phoneme explained below) in the Zeta–Raška dialect. Thus, words like mogao and rekao are pronounced as mogā / mogä and rekā / rekä. This type of contraction is not the usual norm for Štokavian speakers, as it is primarily elsewhere found in Croatian seaside vernaculars. Moreover, this characteristic is not present in all areas of the Zeta–Raška dialect. In certain peripheral areas, the active past participle is not contracted to either -ā or -ä and pronounced fully. In other areas, such as Paštrovići in Budva and Zupci in Bar, speakers contract the masculine active past participle from -ao to -o, such as in mogo and reko (tonal mȍgō, rȅkō). This type of contraction of the active past participle considered the norm among Štokavian speakers. In certain parts of the dialectal region, namely Pješivci, the contraction the masculine active past participle from -ao to -o takes on a further step, where speakers add a v in the coda position, giving dov from davao and prodov from prodavao (tonal dȏv, prȍdōv).

=== Presence of /æ/ ===
Many vernaculars in southern and southeastern Montenegro have a distinct phoneme, characterized as a sound between /a/ and /e/, which is unusual for Shtokavian speakers. The phoneme, transcribed here as ä, can be pronounced as either /ɛ/ or /æ/, depending on the region. This feature is characteristically a reflex of Proto-Slavic ь and ъ (see examples below), but can also form by analogy by the speaker. This phoneme in syllable-final position becomes nasalized by speakers found along the border with Albania, notably rekän and zatekän (standard rekao and zatekao, respectively).

Vernacular	Pronunciation	Standard	Proto-Slavic
dän	/d̪æn̪/	dan	*dьnь
dänäs	/d̪æn̪æs̪/	danas	*dьnьsь
dugačäk	/d̪ugat͡ʃæk/	dugačak	*dьlgъčъkъ
gladän	/glad̪æn̪/	gladan	*gladьnъ
säd	/s̪æd̪/	sad	*sьda

=== Yat reflexes ===
The Zeta–Raška dialect follows the Ijekavian reflex of yat, where ě (ѣ) in Proto-Slavic became either ije, je or e, depending on length and position.

==== Long yat reflex ====
Words with a long yat reflex became pronounced as disyllabic -ije- in middle positions. Examples include bijelo (*bělo), snijeg (*sněgъ), vrijeme (*vrěmę).

This transformation was largely ignored by ethnic Bosniaks living in Podgorica as well as Plav and Gusinje, who followed an Ikavian reflex of yat. Ikavian is another reflex of yat where ě (ѣ) in Proto-Slavic would become -i- in almost all positions. Notably, instead of normal Ijekavian reflexes of yat, like mlijeko and sijeno, speakers in these regions would instead say mliko and sino.

Aside from disyllabic -ije-, speakers in Mrkojevići region near Bar have multiple long yat reflexes. One reflex is -je-, which is a long yat reflex typically found among Bosnian and Croatian Ijekavian speakers. Another is -e-, which is typically found among Ekavian speakers in Serbia and elsewhere.

Secondary ijekavisms, also known as hyperijekavisms, are widespread in the dialectal region. Examples include botijega (botega), kosijer (kosir), pancijer (pancer), but also drijevo and pokrijeva (pokriva).

==== Short yat reflex ====
Words with a short yat reflex become transformed as either -je-, -e- or -i-, depending on length and position.

The transformation of the short yat reflex in a word to -je- creates an iotated vowel. This forces the consonant that comes into contact with the iotated vowel to become either partially or completely palatalized. In the Zeta–Raška dialect, dental consonants such as d, s, t and z become completely palatalized into đ, ś, ć and ź, respectively, before an iotated vowel. In standard varieties of Serbo-Croatian (except Montenegrin), these dentals would merely be partially palatalized, i.e. dj, sj, tj and zj respectively.

Iotation	Vernacular	Standard BCS Ijekavian
-dje- → -đe-	đevojka, poneđeljak	djevojka, ponedjeljak
-sje- → -śe-	śetiti, śekira	sjetiti, sjekira
-tje- → -će-	lećeti, šćeti	letjeti, htjeti
-zje- → -źe-	źenica	zjenica

This iotation is present even in words that do not have a short yat reflex, namely koźetina (kozjetina), iźelica (izjelica) and kiśelo (kisjelo - hyperijekavism).

Iotation of -je- continues in labial consonants such as b, f, m, p and v where they undergo complete palatalization before an iotated vowel. Due to the iotation of labial consonants, the short yat reflex may become transformed into either -je- or -lje- as is common in many vernaculars found in the dialectal region. Such examples include: mjesec / mljesec (tonal mjȅsēc / mljȅsēc), pjesma / pljesma (tonal pjȅsma / pljȅsma) and vjera / vljera (tonal vjȅra / vljȅra).

Short yat transforms into -e- before r, especially where the Proto-Slavic prefixes *pre- and *prě- are merged into pre-, a characteristic common in Ekavian but not in Ijekavian. Examples include: prevoz and prelaz (standard Ijekavian forms: prijevoz and prijelaz). Other examples that follow this trend are gorelo, ređe, rešenje, starešina, among others, but it is common to hear their Ijekavian counterparts (gorjelo, rjeđe, rješenje, starješina) throughout the dialectal region. Ekavian is more present in vernaculars closer to the Serbian border, namely Novi Pazar and Sjenica, where they are under the influence of literary Serbian, which is strictly Ekavian in Serbia.

Short yat transforms into -i- before consonants j and lj, examples: biljeg, grijat and vijavica. Short yat also transforms into -i- before vowel o, usually seen in verbs where the masculine active past participle in Proto-Slavic ends in *-ěl (later forming Proto-Western South Slavic *-ěo). Examples for this transformation include htio, vidio and želio, which is standard in Ijekavian reflexes. However, it is not uncommon to hear htjeo / šćeo, viđeo (> vidjeo) and željeo respectively. Another example is the adjective cio, an unusual contraction of cijel. Its Ekavian counterpart is ceo (from *cělъ) where the -l in coda position transformed into -o, and similarly in Ikavian cio, where it is a contraction of *cil. Here, cio is not an Ikavian borrowing, but rather both Ijekavian and Ikavian reflexes form cio.

=== Lack of phoneme /h/ ~ /x/ ===
Certain areas of the Zeta–Raška dialectal region preserved the phoneme /h/ while others either dropped it completely or replaced it with other consonants. Areas where /h/ was preserved are Old Montenegro (specifically Riječka nahija, Lješanska nahija and parts of Katunska nahija (Bjelice, Ćeklići, Njeguši) and Paštrovići, as well as by ethnic Bosniaks near Bihor, Novi Pazar and Sjenica.

In areas where /h/ was dropped, such as Bar, Bjelopavlići, Kuči, Mrkojevići, Piperi and Zupci, speakers would replace /h/ with either /k/, /g/ (trbuge > trbuhe), /j/ (kijat(i) > kihat(i), Mijajlo > Mihailo) or /v/ (muva > muha). Ironically, some of these forms became part of standard Montenegrin and Serbian, notably kijati and muva, while their original forms kihati and muha can be found in standard Bosnian and Croatian.

=== Palatalization of /l/ into /lʲ/ ===
The alveolar lateral approximant, or /l/, is softened (palatalized) to /lʲ/ in certain vernaculars found in the dialectal region. This characteristic is most present in Bjelopavlići (partially), Bratonožići, Crmnica, Kuči, Mrkojevići, Novi Pazar, Paštrovići, Plav, Gusinje, and Rijeka Crnojevića. Examples include: aprīl' /apri:lʲ/, dal'ȅko /d̪alʲêko̞/ and kol'a᷈č /ko̞lʲât͡ʃ/. This characteristic may be due to influence of Northern Albanian dialects present along the border with Montenegro.

== See also ==
- Serbian language

== Sources ==
- Ivić, Pavle (Павле Ивић) (1956). Dijalektologija srpskohrvatskog jezika: Uvod i štokavsko narečje Дијалектологија српскохрватског језика: Увод и штокавско наречје (1st ed.). Novi Sad: Matica srpska.
- Okuka, Miloš (2008a). Srpski dijalekti. Zagreb: Prosvjeta. ISBN 9789537611064.
- Okuka, Miloš (2008b). "Zetsko-raški dijalekat srpskog jezika". Zbornik Instituta za srpski jezik SANU Зборник Института за српски језик САНУ. Vol. 1. pp. 351–369. Archived from the original on 2018-01-28.
