= List of Serbo-Croatian words of Turkish origin =

Serbo-Croatian vernacular has over time borrowed and adopted a lot of words of Turkish origin. The Ottoman conquest of the Balkans began a linguistical contact between Ottoman Turkish and South Slavic languages, a period of influence since at least the late 14th up until the 20th century, when large territories of Shtokavian-speaking areas became conquered and made into provinces of the Ottoman Empire, into what was collectively known as Rumelia. As the Ottoman Turkish language itself extensively borrowed from Arabic, Persian and Central Asian Turkic languages other than itself, many words of such origins also entered Serbo-Croatian via Turkish. Numerous migrations in the war-torn Western Balkans helped spread Shtokavian and its enriched vernacular. Some Turkisms in Serbo-Croatian have entered the language through other languages, such as Italian, while some words of Greek origin have been adopted in their Turkish forms.

Over the passage of time, many Turkish loanwords were completely adopted into standardized varieties of Serbo-Croatian and are no longer considered loanwords, if not for lack of true synonyms. Numerous such Turkisms (e.g. bakar, alat, sat, čarape, šećer, or boja) are often preferred to later introduced Germanisms and Latinisms (farba, kolur, tinta, pigment). This is mostly the case with the Croatian variety of Serbo-Croatian, which has historically been more stringent to internationalisms. Out of all four varieties of the language, Bosnian has by far introduced and retained the most of Turkisms, largely due to its cultural Islamic ties. Turkish loanwords underwent pronunciation changes, principally on gender suffixes and adaptations of ö, ü, ı that are non-existent in Serbo-Croatian. Turkisms are also commonly called "Orientalisms".

== Characteristics ==
Turkisms often end in one of the following suffixes: –luk, –ci, –li, which come from the original –lik, –çi, –lı. Other suffixes include –ak, –hana, –ija, –suz and –uk. Persian –dār is also a common suffix. Many Serbo-Croatian words that are not of Turkish, Arabic or Persian origin have adopted these suffixes (e.g. kamiondžija, bezobrazluk, lopovluk), showing that influence of Turkish onto Serbo-Croatian extends past loanwords, into morphology and other linguistic characteristics.

== Number of Turkish loanwords ==
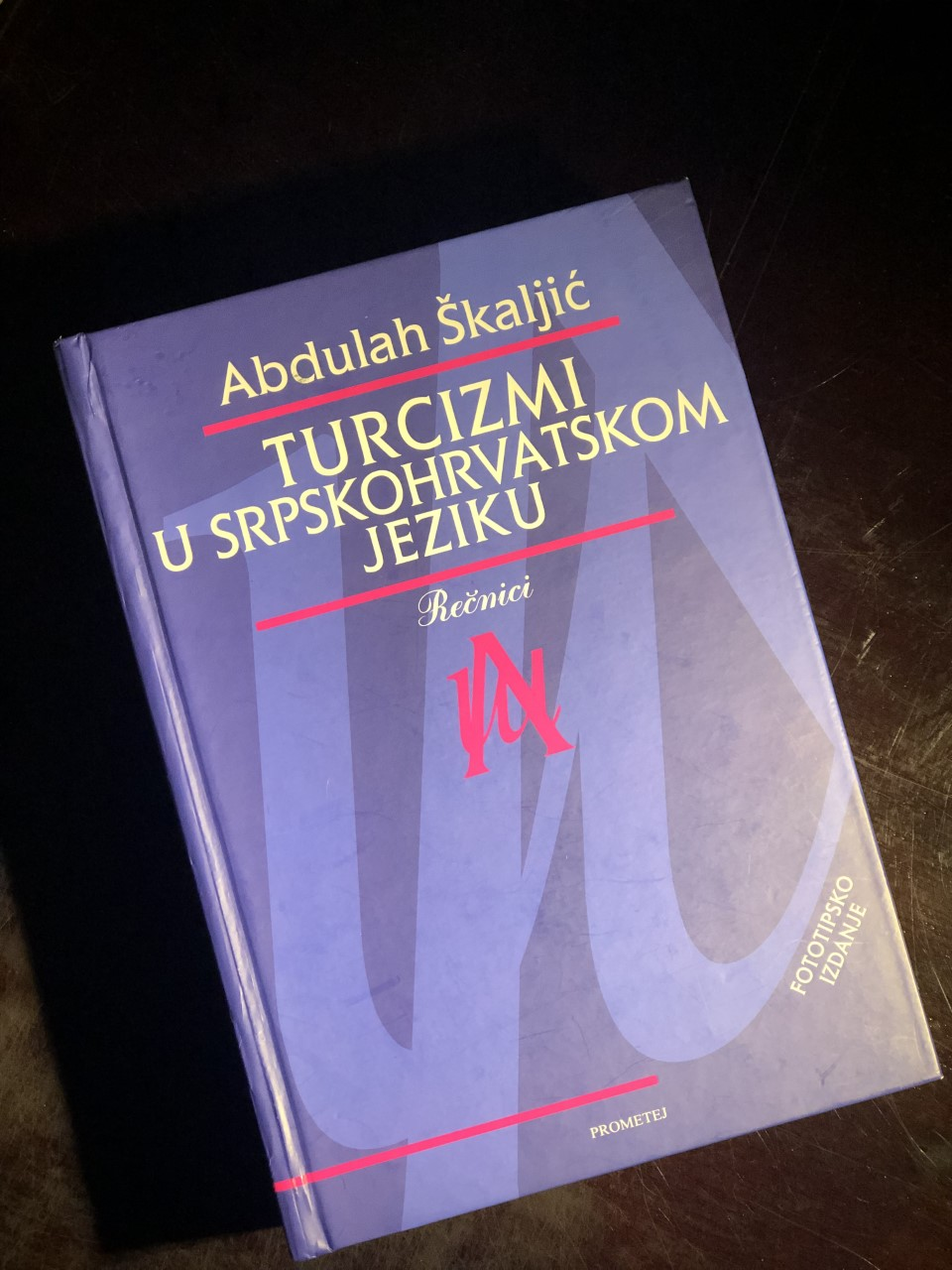
Turkisms in the Serbo-Croatian language by Abdulah Škaljić

There is an uncertainly high number of Turkish loanwords (a lot of which are themselves loanwords from Arabic and Persian) in the modern Serbo-Croatian language, mostly contained within the prestige Shtokavian dialect, and fewer in Kajkavian and Chakavian. The first edition of Srpski rječnik from 1818 listed around 2,500 Turkisms among 26,270 total words (~9,5%), while the second edition from 1852 listed around 3,700 out of 40,000 (~9,25%).

Orientalist expert Olga Zirojević deems that a lot more Turkish loanwords have been used in Serbia's distant past - around 8,000 - than in the present, which is estimated to be around 3,000. First dictionary of Turkisms in Serbia was written by Djordje Popović-Daničar in 1884, called Turkish and other Eastern words in our language (Turske i druge istočanske reči u našem jeziku). The book contains around 6,000 words. Another academic, Dušan Marjanović, compiled a corpus of 5,000 Turkisms in early 1930s.

A prominent Sharia and jurist writer Abdulah Škaljić spent several years at the Institute for the study of folklore of University of Sarajevo thoroughly documenting Turkisms in the folk literature of Bosnia and Herzegovina. He subsequently created the most comprehensive dictionary of Turkisms, first published in 1957 in two volumes, then called Turkisms in the vernacular and folk literature of Bosnia and Herzegovina (Turcizmi u narodnom govoru i narodnoj književnosti Bosne i Hercegovine). Encouraged by great interest among domestic and international scientists and the demand for the dictionary, Škaljić expanded his research to the entirety of Serbo-Croatian-speaking area. In 1965 he published the dictionary named Turkisms in the Serbo-Croatian language (Turcizmi u srpskohrvatskom jeziku), which after several additions and revisions ended up having 8,742 words and 6,878 terms.

An academic research in the Croatian dialectological field was done by Silvana Vranić and Sanja Zubčić at the University of Rijeka. They analyzed a corpus of 443 Shtokavian, 122 Chakavian and 95 Kajkavian phrasemes typical of Croatian speech, in which they found 118, 45 and 29 Turkisms respectively. The ratio of phrasemes per Turkisms was found to be 4.1, 2.7 and 3.3 respectively, showing that Shtokavian contains the most Turkisms, although not equally distributed along regions where it is spoken - the most were found in Dalmatian Hinterland at 39%, then Slavonia at 36%, and Lika at 25%.

== List of loanwords ==
Only a number of Turkish loanwords are common to all four standardized varieties of Serbo-Croatian. Many more Turkisms lie in the vernacular speeches, which vary across regions and cultures. A large number of such loanwords are mainly found in the Bosnian standard, and are considered colloquial or non-existent in other varieties. The following is a non-exhaustive list thereof.

Serbo-Croatian	Turkish	Origin	English meaning
alat	alet	arab. ʔāla	tool
amidža	amca	turk. Amca (father's brother, uncle)	uncle (father's side)
aršin	arşın		arşın (unit of length)
avlija	avlu		courtyard
babo	baba	turk. baba	father, grandfather
badava	bedava	pers. bādihäwā	gratis, free
bajagi, kobajagi	bayaǧı		as if, apparently, quasi
bakar	bakır		copper
baksuz	bahtsız		jinx
bakšiš	bahşiş	pers. bahšīš	tip, fee
barem, bar	bari		at least
barjak, bajrak	bayrak	turk. batrak, batruk	banner, flag
baška	başka		aside
bašta, bašća	bahçe	pers. bāǧçe	garden
bećar, bećarac	bekar	turk. short version of bekaret derived from arab. bikr بكر	bachelor, reveler
bedem	beden	arab. badan	defensive wall
bekrija	bekriya	pers. bakravi from arab. bikr	tippler, drunkard
belaj	bela	arab. balāʔ	trouble
bešika	beşik		bladder
bilmez	bilmez		dimwit, goof
boja	boya		color
bre	bre		more (interjection)
bubreg	böbrek		kidney
budala	budala	arab. budalāʔ	fool
bumbar	bumbar	pers. būnbār, būmbār̕	bumblebee
bunar	pınar		a well
burazer	birader	pers. birāder	brother in law
burma	burma		wedding ring
čak	çak	turk. çak or çok	even
čalabrknuti, čalabrcnuti	çala		fast + bite
čamac	çamac		small boat
čarapa	çorap	arab. cawrab جورب or cūrāb جوراب	sock
čaršija	çarşı		bazaar
čekić	çekiç		hammer
čelik	çelik		steel
česma	çeşme		fountain, faucet
čiča, čika, čiko	çiçe		uncle (both sides)
čičak	çiçek		burdock
čizma	çizme		boot
čoban, čobanac	çoban	pers. šubān	shepherd, shepherd's stew
čukun-, šukun-	kökün		great-great- (kinship)
ćelav	kel		bald
ćenifa	kenef, tuvalet	arab. kanaf	toilet
ćorav	kör, körlük	pers. kūr	blind
ćošak	köşe	pers. kūše	corner
ćup	küp	turk. kūp	jar
ćuprija	köprü	turk. köprüg	bridge
dadilja	dadı	pers. dādā	nanny, babysitter
darmar	tarumar	pers. tār-u mār	higgledy-piggledy
dernek	dernek		fair, festivity
deva	deve		camel
dućan	dükkan	arab. dukkān	shop
dugme	düğme	turk. tukme, düğüm	button
duhan, duvan	duhan, nargile	arab. duḵān / duḵḵān	tobacco
dušek	döşek		mattress
dušman	düşman	pers. dušmen	enemy
džaba	çaba		free, for nothing
džep	cep	arab. jayb	pocket
džin	cin	arab. jinn	giant
džukela	cahil, cühela	arab. juhalāʔ	mutt, big dog
džumbus	cümbüş	pers. ǧunbiš	uproar, disorder
đon	gön		sole (of a shoe)
đubre	gübre		garbage
ekser	ekser		nail
fišek	fişek		ice cream cone
fitilj	fitil	arab. fatīl	fuse
galama	ağlama		noisiness
hajde, ajde	haydi		go ahead, come on
hajduk	haydut		hajduk
hajvan, ajvan	hayvan	arab. ḥaywān	animal (pejoratively)
halka, alka	halka	arab. ḥalqa / ḥalqa	quoit, alka
hašiš	haşiş, esrar	arab. ḥašīš	hashish
inat	inat	arab. ʕinād	spite, defiance
jarak	yarak		trench
jastuk	yastık		pillow
jok	yok		nope, no
jorgan	yorgan		quilt
jorgovan	ergüvan	pers. ergevwn	lilac
juriš	yürüyüş		rush, onslaught, storm
kajiš, kaiš	kayış		belt, strap
kaldrma	kaldırım	turk. kaldırmak(to uplift)-kaldırım	cobblestone
kandža	kanca		claw
kapak	kapak		eyelid
kapija	kapı		gateway, gate
karaula	karavulhane, saat kulesi		watchtower
karavan	karavan		caravan
kat	kat		storey
kavez	kafes	arab. qafaṣ	cage
kazan	kazan	turk. kazğan-kazan	cauldron, kettle
kesa	kese	pers. kīse	bag, sack
kesten	kestane	greek. kástana	chestnut
kiosk	köşk	pers. kūšk	kiosk
komšija	komşu		neighbor
kopča	kopça		buckle
krevet	kerevet, yatak	greek. kreváti	bed
kula	kule	arab. koleh	tower
kusur	kuruş	germ. Grosch	change (money)
kutija	kutu	greek. kouti	box
lakrdija	lakırdı		a variety of farce
lepeza	yelpaze		handheld fan
leš	leş	pers. läše	corpse
lula	lüle	pers. lūle	tobacco pipe
makaze	makas	arab. maqaṣṣ	scissors
majmun	maymun	arab. maymūn	monkey
mamuran	mahmur	arab. maḵmūr	hungover
marama	mahrama, başörtüsü	arab. maḥrama	scarf
mušterija	müşteri	arab. muštari(n)	customer
nanule	nalin, sandal	arab. naʕlayn	wooden sandals
nišan	nişan	pers. nišān	gunpoint
odžak, odžačar	ocak		chimney, chimney sweep
oroz, horoz	horoz	pers. hurūz	rooster
ortak	ortak		partner
pamuk	pamuk	pers. pambeh	cotton
pandža	pençe	pers. penǧe	claw
papuča	pabuç, ayakkabı	pers. pāpūš	slipper
pare	para	pers. pāre	money
pazar	pazar	pers. bāzār	bazaar, piazza, marketplace
pendžer	pencere	pers. penǧere	window
peškir	peşkir, havlu	pers. pīšgīr	towel
raja	raya, kalabalık	arab. raʕiyya	rayah, commoners, crowd
raskalašan	kalleş	pers. qalāš	profligate
sačmarica, sačma	saçma		shotgun, shot pellets
saksija	saksı		flowerpot
sanduk	sandık	arab. sandūq / sundūq	chest, crate, box
sapun	sabun	lat. sapo	soap
sat	saat	arab. sât	clock
sevdalinka	sevdalı		sevdalinka
sokak	sokak	arab. zuqāq	alley
sunđer	sünger		sponge
surla	zurna	pers. sūrnā	trunk (of an elephant)
šamar	şamar		slap, smack
šah	şah	pers. šah	chess
šator, čador	çadır	turk. çatır,çaşır	tent
šuga	şuga	pers. šūg	scabies
taban	taban		sole (of a foot)
taman	tamam	arab. tamām	just right
tambura, tamburica	tambur		tamboura, tamburica
tava	tava	pers. tābe	pan
tavan	tavan		attic
testera	testere	pers. destere	saw
top	top		cannon
trampa	trampa	ital. tramuta	barter, exchange
tulipan	tülbent, lale	pers. dülbend	tulip
tulum	tulum, parti		party (having fun)
turpija	törpü		file (tool)
zanat	sanat	arab. ṣanʕa	trade, occupation, profession
zumbul	sümbül	pers. sunbul	hyacinth

=== Food and cuisine loanwords ===
Serbo-Croatian	Turkish	Origin	English meaning
ajran	ayran		ayran
ajvar	havyar		ajvar
avan/havan s tučkom	havan ve tokmak		mortar and pestle
badem	badem		almond
baklava	baklava		baklava
batak	bacak		drumstick (poultry)
biber	biber	greek. péperi	black pepper
boranija, buranija	borani	pers. borâni	green bean stew
bostan	bostan, karpuz, kavun	pers. būstān	watermelon, melon
boza	boza	turk. buza	boza
burek	börek		börek
čaj	çay	chin. chá	tea
čorba	çorba	pers. šūrbā, šūrbaǧ	chorba
ćevapi	kebap	arab. kabāb	ćevapi
ćufte	köfte	pers. kūfte	meatballs
dolma	dolma		dolma
đulabija	gülabi	pers. gulābī	rose apple
đuveč	güveç		güveç
džezva	cezve	arab. jaḏwa / jiḏwa	cezve
džigerica	ciğer	pers. ǧiger	liver (food)
fildžan, fildižan, findžan	fincan	arab. finjān < pers. pingān	orientally decorated cup
halva, alva	helva	arab. ḥalwā	halva
ibrik	ibrik	arab. ʔibrīq < pers. ābrīz	ibrik
jogurt	yoğurt		yogurt
kafa, kava, kahva	kahve	arab. qahwah	coffee
kajgana	kaygana		scrambled eggs
kajmak	kaymak		kaymak
kajsija	kayısı		apricot
kašika	kaşık		spoon
kefir	kefir		kefir
limun	limon	arab. laymūn < sanskr. nimbū निम्बू	lemon
meza, meze	meze	pers. mazzeh	meze
naranča	naranciye, portakal	Arab. nāranc نارنج < pers. nārenǧ, nāreng < Sanskr. nāgaranga or nāranga नागरङ्ग	orange
nana, nena (metvica)	nane	arab. naʕnaʕ / naʕnāʕ	spearmint
pastrma, pastirma	pastırma		pastirma
patlidžan	patlıcan	pers. bādinǧān, bâdendžân	eggplant
pekmez	pekmez		jam
pilav	pilav	pers. pilāw< sanskr. pulāka पुलाक	pilaf
pita	pide	greek. pita< assyr. pītā פִּיתָּא	pie
ratluk	lokum	arab. rāḥa(t) al-ḥulqūm	turkish delight
rakija	rakı	arab.ʕaraq	rakia
sarma	sarma		sarma (food)
šafran	safran	arab. zaʕfarān	saffron
šećer	şeker	pers. šekar or sanskr.śakkharā	sugar
šerbet	şerbet	arab. šarba	sharbat
sirće	sirke	turk. sirke	vinegar
sudžuk	sucuk		sujuk
sutlijaš	sütlaç		rice pudding
tepsija	tepsi		casserole
tulumba	tulumba		tulumba

== See also ==
- Arabic-Persian-Greek-Serbian Conversation Textbook
