= Bosnian language =

Standard variety of Serbo-Croatian

Bosnian
- bosanski / босански bosanski jezik / босански језик
- Pronunciation: [bɔ̌sanskiː]
- Native to: Bosnia and Herzegovina; Serbia; Montenegro; Croatia; North Macedonia; Kosovo
- Region: Bosnia, Herzegovina and Sandžak
- Ethnicity: Bosniaks
- Native speakers: 3.1 million (2020–2023)
- Language family: Indo-European: Balto-Slavic; Slavic; South Slavic; Western; Serbo-Croatian; Bosnian
- Early forms: Proto-Indo-European: Proto-Balto-Slavic; Proto-Slavic; Proto-Serbo-Croatian; Shtokavian; Eastern Herzegovinian
- Dialects: Eastern Bosnian; Eastern Herzegovinian; Western Bosnian; Western Herzegovinian; Sandžak (also known as South Sandžak and Zeta-Sandžak)
- Writing system: Latin (Gaj's Latin alphabet) (Note: Latin is the predominant script, officially used in the Federation of Bosnia and Herzegovina.); Cyrillic (Serbian Cyrillic alphabet) (Note: Cyrillic is an officially recognized alphabet, but in practice it is mainly used in Republika Srpska, whereas in the Federation of Bosnia and Herzegovina mainly Latin is used.); Yugoslav Braille; Formerly: Arabic (Arebica); Bosnian Cyrillic (Bosančica)

Official status
- Official language in: Bosnia and Herzegovina (Note: Although Bosnia and Herzegovina does not have an official language at the state level, Bosnian has been designated as an official language in its entities: the Federation of Bosnia and Herzegovina and Republika Srpska.); Montenegro (co-official)
- Recognised minority language in: Serbia; Croatia; North Macedonia; Kosovo

Language codes
- ISO 639-1: bs
- ISO 639-2: bos
- ISO 639-3: bos
- Glottolog: bosn1245
- Linguasphere: part of 53-AAA-g
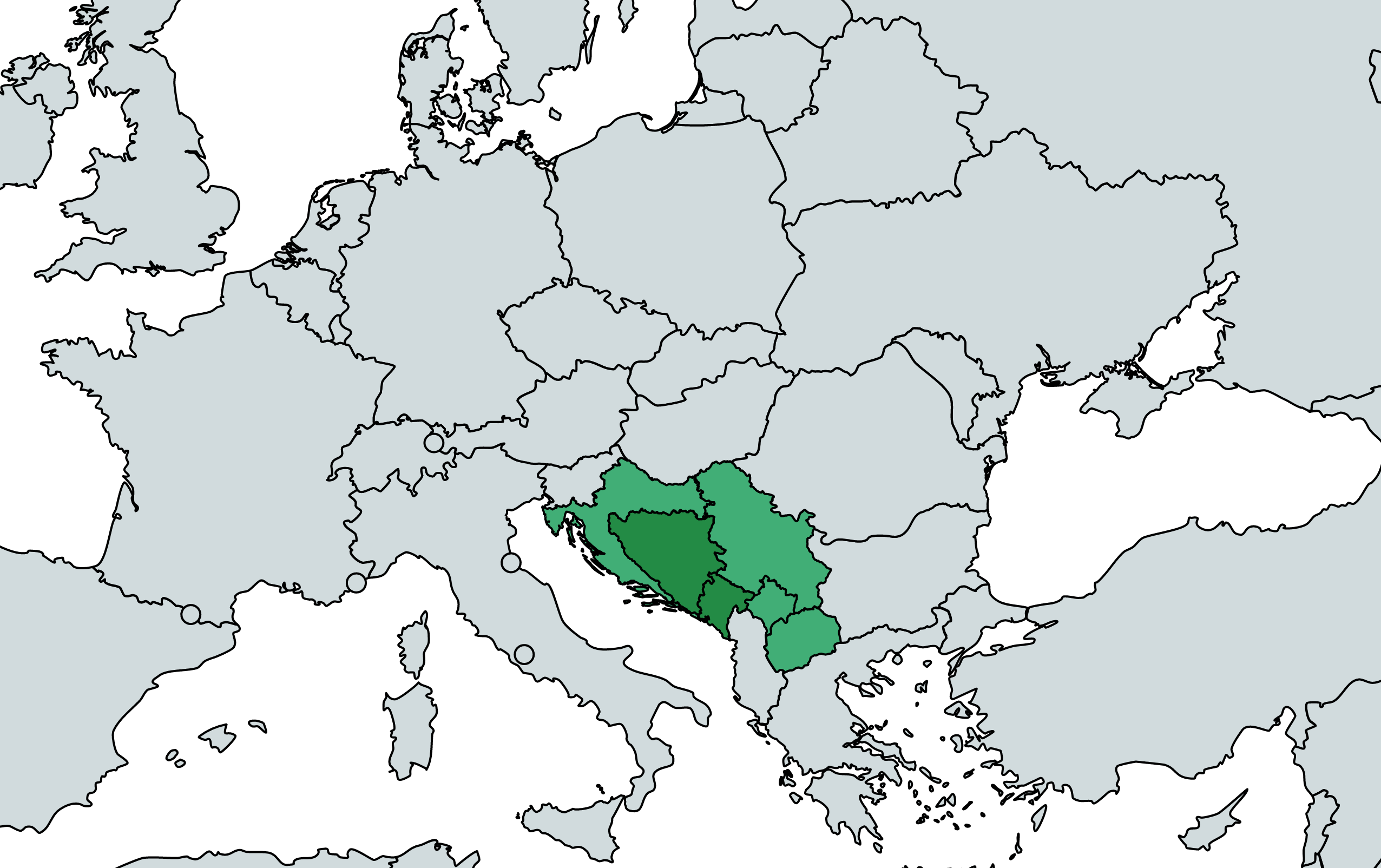
- Countries where Bosnian is a co-official language (dark green) or a recognised minority language (light green)

- Bosnian is not endangered according to the classification system of the UNESCO Atlas of the World's Languages in Danger.

Bosnian (Note: /ˈbɒzniən/; bosanski / босански; [bɔ̌sanskiː]) is the standard variety of the Serbo-Croatian language mainly used by Bosniaks. (Note: Sources:) It is one of the three official languages of Bosnia and Herzegovina, a co-official language in Montenegro, and an officially recognized minority language in Croatia, Serbia, North Macedonia and Kosovo. (Note: Sources:)

Bosnian uses both the Latin and Cyrillic alphabets, with Latin in everyday use. It is notable among the varieties of Serbo-Croatian for a number of Arabic, Persian and Ottoman Turkish loanwords, (Note: Further information: List of Serbo-Croatian words of Turkish origin) largely due to the language's interaction with those cultures through Islamic ties.

Bosnian is based on the most widespread dialect of Serbo-Croatian, Shtokavian, more specifically on Eastern Herzegovinian, which is also the basis of standard Croatian, Serbian and Montenegrin varieties. Therefore, the Declaration on the Common Language of Croats, Serbs, Bosniaks and Montenegrins was issued in 2017 in Sarajevo. Although the common name for the common language remains 'Serbo-Croatian', newer alternatives such as 'Bosnian-Croatian-Serbian' and 'Bosnian-Croatian-Montenegrin-Serbian' (commonly abbreviated 'BCMS') have been increasingly utilised since the 1990s, especially within diplomatic circles. Informally, the terms naš and naški ('ours / our language') are frequently used to avoid controversies over the naming of these languages.

== Alphabet ==
Table of the modern Bosnian alphabet in both Latin and Cyrillic, as well as with the IPA value, sorted according to Cyrillic:

Cyrillic	Latin	IPA value
А а	A a	/a/
Б б	B b	/b/
В в	V v	/v/
Г г	G g	/ɡ/
Д д	D d	/d/
Ђ ђ	Đ đ	/dʑ/
Е е	E e	/ɛ/
Ж ж	Ž ž	/ʒ/
З з	Z z	/z/
И и	I i	/i/
Ј ј	J j	/j/
К к	K k	/k/
Л л	L l	/l/
Љ љ	Lj lj	/ʎ/
М м	M m	/m/

Cyrillic	Latin	IPA value
Н н	N n	/n/
Њ њ	Nj nj	/ɲ/
О о	O o	/ɔ/
П п	P p	/p/
Р р	R r	/ɾ/
С с	S s	/s/
Т т	T t	/t/
Ћ ћ	Ć ć	/tɕ/
У у	U u	/u/
Ф ф	F f	/f/
Х х	H h	/x/
Ц ц	C c	/ts/
Ч ч	Č č	/tʃ/
Џ џ	Dž dž	/dʒ/
Ш ш	Š š	/ʃ/

== History ==
=== Standardization ===
Old Bosnian alphabets: bosančica (top line) and arebica (bottom line), compared with contemporary latinica (middle line)

A Bosnian speaker, recorded in Kosovo

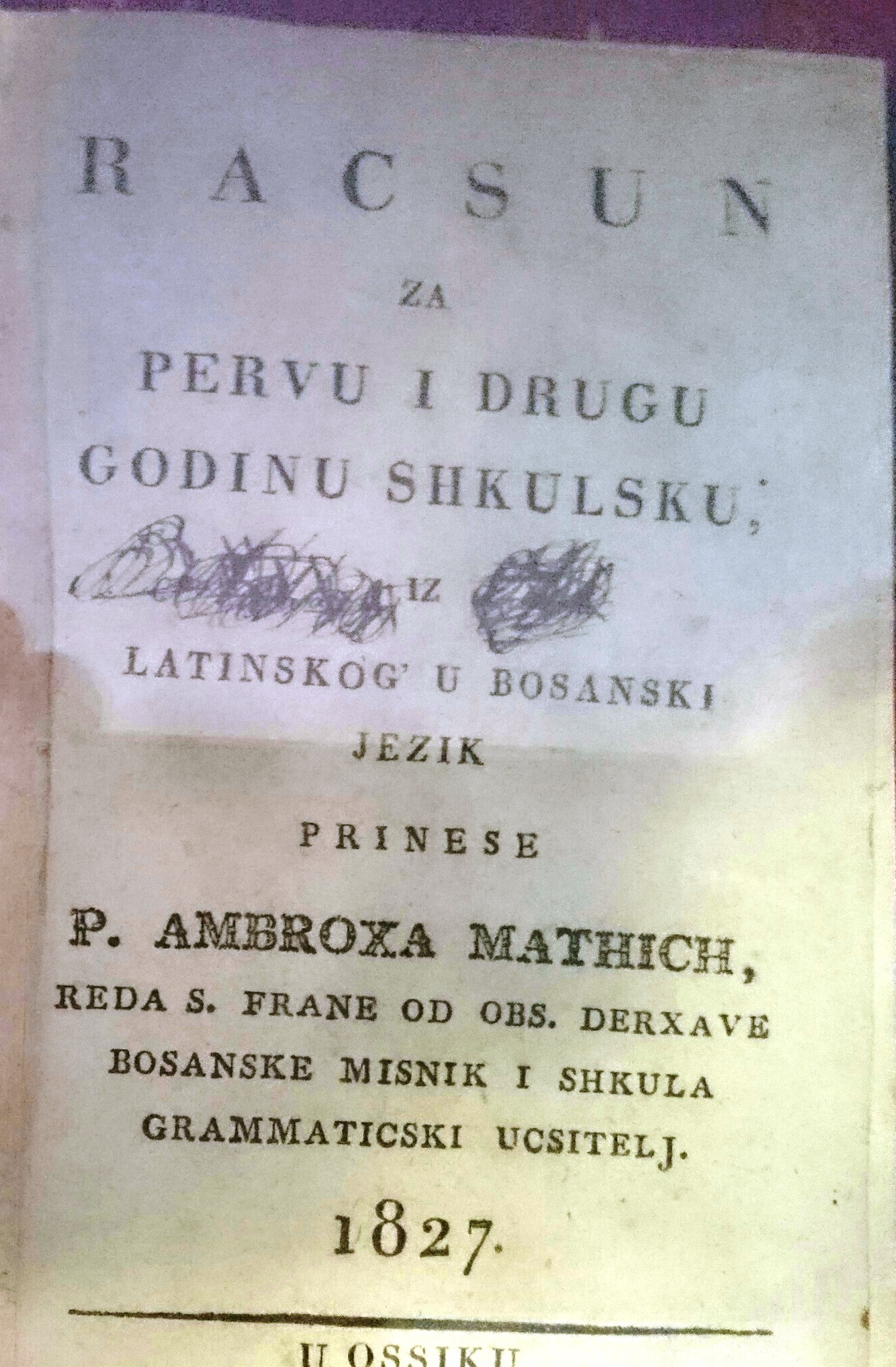
School book of Latin and Bosnian, 1827

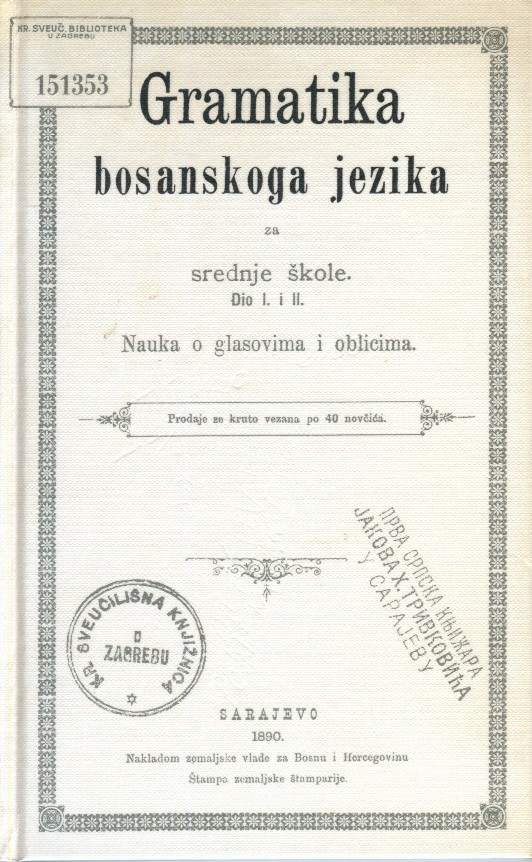
Bosnian Grammar, 1890

Although Bosnians are, at the level of vernacular idiom, linguistically more homogeneous than either Serbians or Croatians, unlike those nations they failed to codify a standard language in the 19th century, with at least two factors being decisive:

- The Bosnian elite, as closely intertwined with Ottoman life, wrote predominantly in foreign (Arabic, Persian, Ottoman Turkish) languages. Vernacular literature written in Bosnian with the Arebica script was relatively thin and sparse.
- The Bosnians' national emancipation lagged behind that of the Serbs and Croats and because denominational rather than cultural or linguistic issues played the pivotal role, a Bosnian language project did not arouse much interest or support amongst the intelligentsia of the time.

The modern Bosnian standard took shape in the 1990s and 2000s. Lexically, Islamic-Oriental loanwords are more frequent. Phonetically, the phoneme /x/ (spelled ⟨h⟩) is reinstated in many words as a distinct feature of vernacular Bosniak speech and language tradition. There are also some changes in grammar, morphology and orthography that reflect the Bosniak pre-World War I literary tradition, mainly that of the Bosniak renaissance at the beginning of the 20th century.

=== Gallery ===
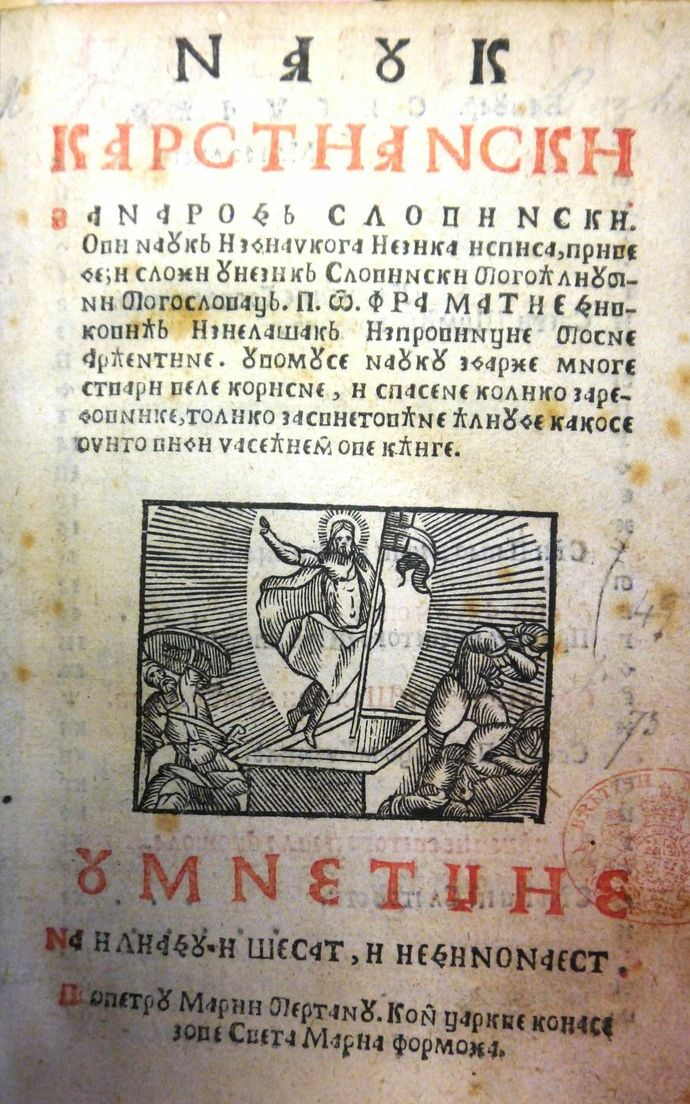
Nauk krstjanski za narod slovinski, by Matija Divković, the first Bosnian printed book. Published in Venice, 1611

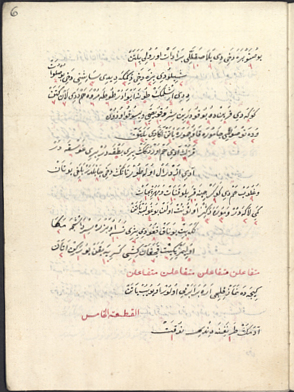
Bosnian dictionary by Muhamed Hevaji Uskufi Bosnevi, 1631

The Free Will and Acts of Faith, manuscript from the early 19th century

The Bosnian Book of the Science of Conduct by 'Abdulvehab Žepčevi, 1831

Bosnian Grammar, 1890

=== Controversy and recognition ===
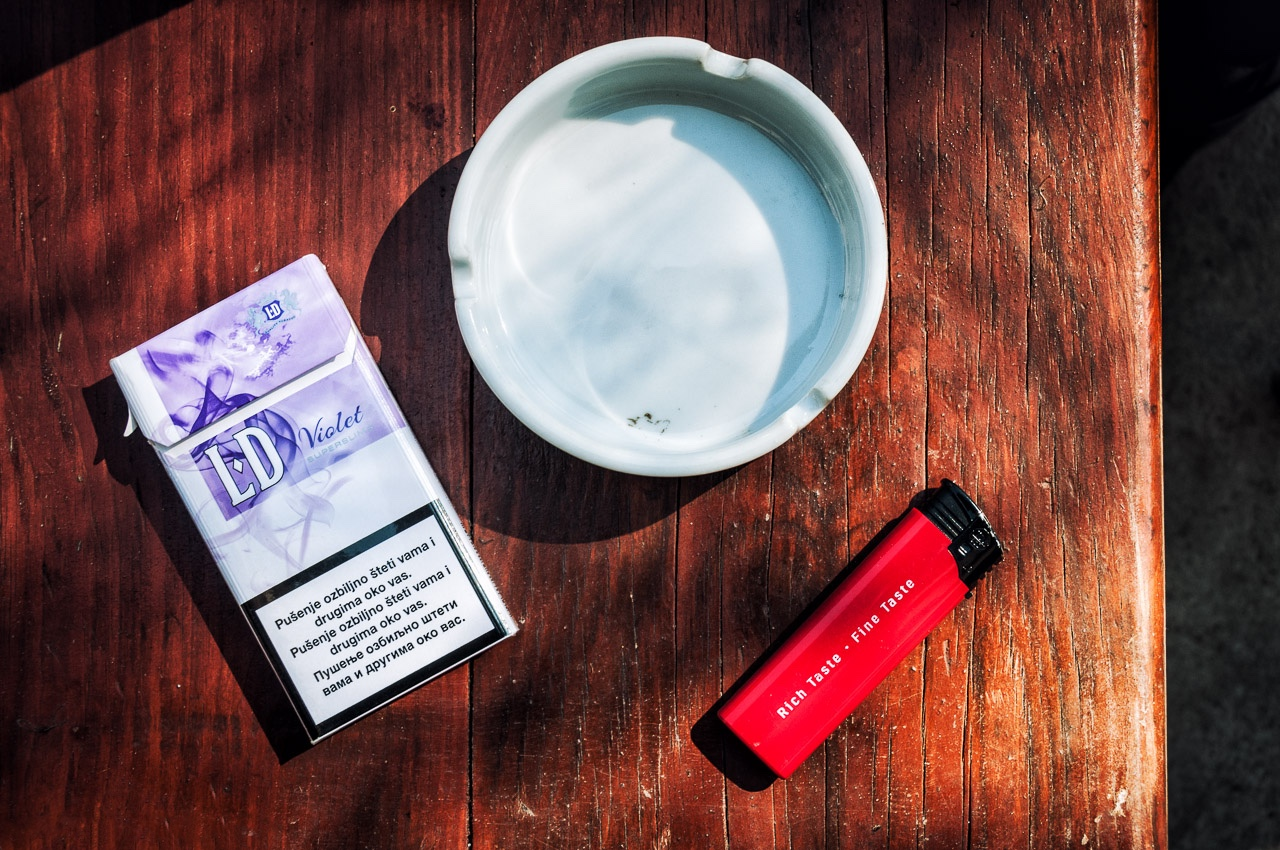
A cigarette warning "Smoking seriously harms you and others around you", ostensibly in three languages. The "Bosnian" and "Croatian" versions are identical and the "Serbian" one is a Cyrilic transliteration of the exact same text.

The name "Bosnian language" is a controversial issue for some Croats and Serbs, who also refer to it as the "Bosniak" language (Serbo-Croatian: bošnjački / бошњачки, [bǒʃɲaːtʃkiː]). Bosniak linguists however insist that the only legitimate name is "Bosnian" language (bosanski) and that that is the name that both Croats and Serbs should use. The controversy arises because the name "Bosnian" may seem to imply that it is the language of all Bosnians, while Bosnian Croats and Serbs reject that designation for their idioms.

The language is called Bosnian language in the 1995 Dayton Accords and is concluded by observers to have received legitimacy and international recognition at the time. The International Organization for Standardization (ISO), United States Board on Geographic Names (BGN) and the Permanent Committee on Geographical Names (PCGN) recognize the Bosnian language. Furthermore, the status of the Bosnian language is also recognized by bodies such as the United Nations, UNESCO and translation and interpreting accreditation agencies, including internet translation services.

Most English-speaking language encyclopedias (Routledge, Glottolog, Ethnologue, etc.) register the language solely as "Bosnian" language. The Library of Congress registered the language as "Bosnian" and gave it an ISO-number. The Slavic language institutes in English-speaking countries offer courses in "Bosnian" or "Bosnian/Croatian/Serbian" language, not in "Bosniak" language (e.g. Columbia, Cornell, Chicago, Washington, Kansas). The same is the case in German-speaking countries, where the language is taught under the name Bosnisch, not Bosniakisch (e.g. Vienna, Graz, Trier) with very few exceptions.

I began writing The Legend of Ali Pasha with a specific purpose - to preserve our Bosnian language. Not the language of denominations or peoples of Bosnia, but the language of Bosnia. I also wanted to re-create a historical period of Bosnia.

— Enver Čolaković, 1971

Some Croatian linguists (Zvonko Kovač, Ivo Pranjković, Josip Silić) support the name "Bosnian" language, whereas others (Radoslav Katičić, Dalibor Brozović, Tomislav Ladan) hold that the term Bosnian language is the only one appropriate and that accordingly the terms Bosnian language and Bosniak language refer to two different things. The Croatian state institutions, such as the Central Bureau of Statistics, use both terms: "Bosniak" language was used in the 2001 census, while the census in 2011 used the term "Bosnian" language.

The majority of Serbian linguists hold that the term Bosniak language is the only one appropriate, which was agreed as early as 1990. The original form of The Constitution of the Federation of Bosnia and Herzegovina called the language "Bosniac language", until 2002 when it was changed in Amendment XXIX of the Constitution of the Federation by Wolfgang Petritsch. The original text of the Constitution of the Federation of Bosnia and Herzegovina was agreed in Vienna and was signed by Krešimir Zubak and Haris Silajdžić on March 18, 1994.

The constitution of Republika Srpska, the Serb-dominated entity within Bosnia and Herzegovina, did not recognize any language or ethnic group other than Serbian. Bosniaks were mostly expelled from the territory controlled by the Serbs from 1992, but immediately after the war they demanded the restoration of their civil rights in those territories. The Bosnian Serbs refused to make reference to the Bosnian language in their constitution and as a result had constitutional amendments imposed by High Representative Wolfgang Petritsch. However, the constitution of Republika Srpska refers to it as the Language spoken by Bosniaks, because the Serbs were required to recognise the language officially, but wished to avoid recognition of its name.

Serbia includes the Bosnian language as an elective subject in primary schools. Montenegro officially recognizes the Bosnian language: its 2007 Constitution specifically states that although Montenegrin is the official language, Serbian, Bosnian, Albanian and Croatian are also in official use.

=== Historical usage of the term ===
- In the work Skazanie izjavljenno o pismeneh that was written between 1423 and 1426, the Bulgarian chronicler Constantine the Philosopher, in parallel with the Bulgarian, Serbian, Slovenian, Czech and Croatian, he also mentions the Bosnian language.
- The notary book of the town of Kotor from July 3, 1436, recounts a duke buying a girl that is described as a: "Bosnian woman, heretic and in the Bosnian language called Djevena".
- The work Thesaurus Polyglottus, published in Frankfurt am Main in 1603 by the German historian and linguist Hieronymus Megiser, mentions the Bosnian dialect alongside the Dalmatian, Croatian and Serbian one.
- The Bosnian Franciscan Matija Divković, regarded as the founder of the modern literature of Bosnia and Herzegovina, asserts in his work Nauk krstjanski za narod slovinski ("The Christian doctrine for the Slavic peoples") from 1611 his "translation from Latin to the real and true Bosnian language" (A privideh iz dijačkog u pravi i istinit jezik bosanski)
- Bosniak poet and Aljamiado writer Muhamed Hevaji Uskufi Bosnevi who refers to the language of his 1632 dictionary Magbuli-arif as Bosnian.
- One of the first grammarians, the Jesuit clergyman Bartol Kašić calls the language used in his work from 1640 Ritual rimski ('Roman Rite') as naški ('our language') or bosanski ('Bosnian'). He used the term "Bosnian" even though he was born in a Chakavian region: instead he decided to adopt a "common language" (lingua communis) based on a version of Shtokavian Ikavian.
- The Croatian linguist Jakov Mikalja (1601–1654) who states in his dictionary Blagu jezika slovinskoga (Thesaurus lingue Illyricae) from 1649 that he wants to include "the most beautiful words" adding that "of all Illyrian languages the Bosnian is the most beautiful", and that all Illyrian writers should try to write in that language.
- 18th century Bosniak chronicler Mula Mustafa Bašeskija who argues in his yearbook of collected Bosnian poems that the "Bosnian language" is much richer than the Arabic, because there are 45 words for the verb "to go" in Bosnian.
- The Venetian writer, naturalist and cartographer Alberto Fortis (1741–1803) calls in his work Viaggio in Dalmazia ("Journey to Dalmatia") the language of Morlachs as Illyrian, Morlach and Bosnian.
- The Croatian writer and lexicographer Matija Petar Katančić published six volumes of biblical translations in 1831 described as being "transferred from Slavo-Illyrian to the pronunciation of the Bosnian language".
- Croatian writer Matija Mažuranić refers in the work Pogled u Bosnu (1842) to the language of Bosnians as Illyrian (a 19th-century synonym to South Slavic languages) mixed with Turkish words, with a further statement that they are the speakers of the Bosniak language.
- The Bosnian Franciscan Ivan Franjo Jukić states in his work Zemljopis i Poviestnica Bosne (1851) that Bosnia was the only Turkish land (i.e. under the control of the Ottoman Empire) that remained entirely pure without Turkish speakers, both in the villages and so on the highlands. Further he states "[...] a language other than the Bosnian is not spoken [in Bosnia], the greatest Turkish [i.e. Muslim] gentlemen only speak Turkish when they are at the Vizier".
- Ivan Kukuljević Sakcinski, a 19th-century Croatian writer and historian, stated in his work Putovanje po Bosni (Travels into Bosnia) from 1858, how the 'Turkish' (i.e. Muslim) Bosniaks, despite converting to the Muslim faith, preserved their traditions and the Slavic mood, and that they speak the purest variant of the Bosnian language, by refusing to add Turkish words to their vocabulary.

== Differences between Bosnian, Croatian and Serbian ==
The differences between the Bosnian, Serbian, and Croatian literary standards are minimal. Although Bosnian employs more Turkish, Persian, and Arabic loanwords—commonly called orientalisms—mainly in its spoken variety due to the fact that most Bosnian speakers are Muslims, it is still very similar to both Serbian and Croatian in its written and spoken form. "Lexical differences between the ethnic variants are extremely limited, even when compared with those between closely related Slavic languages (such as standard Czech and Slovak, Bulgarian and Macedonian), and grammatical differences are even less pronounced. More importantly, complete understanding between the ethnic variants of the standard language makes translation and second language teaching impossible."

The Bosnian language, as a new normative register of the Shtokavian dialect, was officially introduced in 1996 with the publication of Pravopis bosanskog jezika in Sarajevo. According to that work, Bosnian differed from Serbian and Croatian on some main linguistic characteristics, such as: sound formats in some words, especially "h" (kahva versus Serbian kafa); substantial and deliberate usage of Oriental ("Turkish") words; spelling of future tense (kupit ću) as in Croatian but not Serbian (kupiću) (both forms have the same pronunciation). 2018, in the new issue of Pravopis bosanskog jezika, words without "h" are accepted due to their prevalence in language practice.

== Sample text ==
Article 1 of the Universal Declaration of Human Rights in Bosnian, written in the Cyrillic script:

Сва људска бића рађају се слободна и једнака у достојанству и правима. Она су обдарена разумом и свијешћу и треба да једно према другоме поступају у духу братства.

Article 1 of the Universal Declaration of Human Rights in Bosnian, written in the Latin alphabet:

Sva ljudska bića rađaju se slobodna i jednaka u dostojanstvu i pravima. Ona su obdarena razumom i sviješću i treba da jedno prema drugome postupaju u duhu bratstva.

Article 1 of the Universal Declaration of Human Rights in English:

All human beings are born free and equal in dignity and rights. They are endowed with reason and conscience and should act towards one another in a spirit of brotherhood.

== See also ==
- Abstand and ausbau languages
- Bosniaks
- Bosnian studies
- Dialects of Serbo-Croatian
- Humac tablet
- Hval's Codex
- Language secessionism in Serbo-Croatian
- Muhamed Hevaji Uskufi Bosnevi
- Oriental Institute in Sarajevo
- Pluricentric Serbo-Croatian language
- Declaration on the Common Language 2017

== Sources and further reading ==
- Alexander, Ronelle (2006). Bosnian, Croatian, Serbian, a Grammar: With Sociolinguistic Commentary. Univ of Wisconsin Press. pp. 1–2. ISBN 9780299211936.
- Gröschel, Bernhard (2001). "Bosnisch oder Bosniakisch?" [Bosnian or Bosniak?]. In Waßner, Ulrich Hermann (ed.). Lingua et linguae. Festschrift für Clemens-Peter Herbermann zum 60. Geburtstag. Bochumer Beitraäge zur Semiotik, n.F., 6 (in German). Aachen: Shaker. pp. 159–188. ISBN 978-3-8265-8497-8. OCLC 47992691.
- Kafadar, Enisa (2009). "Bosnisch, Kroatisch, Serbisch – Wie spricht man eigentlich in Bosnien-Herzegowina?" [Bosnian, Croatian, Serbian – How do people really speak in Bosnia-Herzegovina?]. In Henn-Memmesheimer, Beate; Franz, Joachim (eds.). Die Ordnung des Standard und die Differenzierung der Diskurse; Teil 1 (in German). Frankfurt am Main: Peter Lang. pp. 95–106. ISBN 9783631599174. OCLC 699514676.
- Kordić, Snježana (2005). "I dalje jedan jezik" [Still one language]. Sarajevske Sveske (in Serbo-Croatian) (10). Sarajevo: 83–89. ISSN 1512-8539. SSRN 3432980. CROSBI 430085. ZDB-ID 2136753-X. Archived from the original on 21 September 2013. (COBISS-BH).
- —— (2011). "Jezična politika: prosvjećivati ili zamagljivati?" [Language policy: to clarify or to obscure?] (PDF). In Gavrić, Saša (ed.). Jezička/e politika/e u Bosni i Hercegovini i njemačkom govornom području: zbornik radova predstavljenih na istoimenoj konferenciji održanoj 22. marta 2011. godine u Sarajevu (in Serbo-Croatian). Sarajevo: Goethe-Institut Bosnien und Herzegowina; Ambasada Republike Austrije; Ambasada Švicarske konfederacije. pp. 60–66. ISBN 978-9958-1959-0-7. OCLC 918205883. SSRN 3434489. CROSBI 565627. Archived (PDF) from the original on 25 September 2013. (ÖNB).
- Sotirović, V.B. (2014). "Bosnian Language and ITS Inauguration: The Fate of the Former Serbocroat or Croatoserb Language". Sustainable Multilingualism. 3 (3): 47–61. doi:10.7220/2335-2027.3.5.
