= Tomislav Ladan =

- Born: 25 June 1932; Ivanjica, Kingdom of Yugoslavia
- Died: 12 September 2008 (aged 76); Zagreb, Croatia
- Occupation: Essayist

Tomislav Ladan (25 June 1932 – 12 September 2008) was a Croatian essayist, critic, translator and novelist.

Ladan was born in Ivanjica, Serbia, and spent his formative years in his native Bosnia and Herzegovina (Travnik, Bugojno), where he graduated from the Philosophical Faculty at Sarajevo. Since he couldn't get permanent employment in the then Serbs-dominated Bosnian cultural life because of his sometimes ostentatious Croatian identity, Ladan worked intermittently as a private tutor, translator and journalist — until the Croatian doyen of belles letters, Miroslav Krleža, found him a job at the Yugoslav Lexicographical Institute in Zagreb. Ladan was the director of the same institute and the editor-in-chief of an eight-language parallel dictionary.

Ladan wrote several books of essays that cover diverse fields such as cursing in Croatian, voluminous polygraphy playing with etymological meanings of the words that define human culture, from God to globalization (Riječi, "Words"), and nuances of medieval spiritual culture (Parva medievalia).

Ladan's only novel, Bosanski grb ("Bosnian coat of arms") (1975) is a postmodernist fiction written as a combination of Rabelaisian linguistic feast and a treatise on the historical destiny of Croats in central Bosnia.

As a critic over more than four decades, Ladan surveyed virtually all works written in Croatian, Serbian, and Bosnian — not infrequently to the consternation of the "objects" of his criticism. Follower of T. S. Eliot, Ezra Pound and Frank Kermode, Ladan didn't pay much attention to the deconstructionists (Derrida) or Foucault, both of whom he found arid and sterile. His best critical essays also evaluate such writers as William Faulkner and Robert Musil.

Ladan was also a noted translator from Greek, Latin, English, German, Swedish and Norwegian.
