= Arebica =

Serbo-Croatian variant of the Arabic script

- Script type: Alphabet, based upon the Perso-Arabic script
- Period: 16th–20th century
- Languages: Serbo-Croatian

The handbook Bosnian Book of the Science of Conduct, published in 1831 by the Bosnian author and poet Abdulvehab Ilhamija, is printed in Arebica.

Arebica (عربٖىڄا ,آره‌بٖىڄا; Serbo-Croatian Cyrillic: Аребица) is a variant of the Perso-Arabic script used to write the Serbo-Croatian language. It was used mainly between the 16th and 20th centuries and is frequently categorized as part of Aljamiado literature. During Austro-Hungarian rule, there were unsuccessful efforts by Bosnian Muslims to grant Arebica equal status alongside Latin and Cyrillic alphabets.

Apart from literature, Arebica was used in religious schools and administration, though in much less use than other scripts. It originated in the 16th century in Ottoman Bosnia and was significantly reformed in the 20th century by the Bosnian imam Mehmed Džemaludin Čaušević.

== Origin ==
Arebica was based on the Perso-Arabic script of the Ottoman Empire, with added letters for /t͡s/, /ʎ/ and /ɲ/, which are not found in Arabic, Persian or Turkish. Full letters were eventually introduced for all vowels (as with Kurdish Arabic script), making Arebica a true alphabet, unlike its Perso-Arabic base.

Arebica was used by the Bosnian Muslims in Central Bosnia during the Ottoman rule and continued usage during the Austro-Hungarian rule in Bosnia and Herzegovina. During that period, they requested that Arebica be given equal status with the Latin and Cyrillic scripts, but the request wasn't granted. The usage of the script, however, continued sporadically even after.

The final version of Arebica was devised by Mehmed Džemaludin Čaušević at the beginning of the 20th century. His version is called Reformirana arebica, Matufovica, Matufovača or Mektebica.

The oldest text written in Arebica is called Chirvat-türkisi (Serbo-Croatian: Hrvatska turćija) from 1588/89, authored by Mehmed of Erdely.

== Contemporary use ==
The first literary work to be published in Arebica since 1941 was the comic book "Hadži Šefko i hadži Mefko" in 2005, by authors Amir Al-Zubi and Meliha Čičak-Al-Zubi. The authors made slight modifications to Arebica. The first book in Arebica with an ISBN was "Epohe fonetske misli kod Arapa i arebica" ("The Age of Phonetic Thought of Arabs and Arebica") in April 2013 in Belgrade by Aldin Mustafić, MSc. This book represents the completion of the standardization of Mehmed Džemaludin Čaušević's version, and is also a textbook for higher education.

== Alphabet ==
The final version of Arebica alphabet was devised at the end of the 19th century by Mehmed Džemaludin Čaušević. The alphabet listed here is a new version made by Aldin Mustafić.

Latin	Cyrillic	Arebica				IPA
Latin	Cyrillic	Contextual forms			Isolated	IPA
Latin	Cyrillic	Final	Medial	Initial	Isolated	IPA
A a	А а	ـا		آ		/a/
B b	Б б	ـب	ـبـ	بـ	ب	/b/
C c	Ц ц	ـڄ	ـڄـ	ڄـ	ڄ	/ts/
Č č	Ч ч	ـچ	ـچـ	چـ	چ	/tʃ/
Ć ć	Ћ ћ	A final Ha with an upward-pointing V shape in the body (jism)	A medial Ha with an upward-pointing V shape underneath the tooth (sinn)	An initial Ha with an upward-pointing V shape underneath the tooth (sinn)	^{[b]}	/t͡ɕ/
D d	Д д	ـد		د		/d/
Dž dž	Џ џ	ـج	ـجـ	جـ	ج ^{[c]}	/dʒ/
Đ đ	Ђ ђ	A final Ha with a downward-pointing V shape in the body (jism)	A medial Ha with a downward-pointing V shape underneath the tooth (sinn)	An initial Ha with a downward-pointing V shape underneath the tooth (sinn)	An isolated Ha with a downward-pointing V shape in the body (jism)	/d͡ʑ/
E e	Е е	ـە		ئە	ە	/e/
F f	Ф ф	ـف	ـفـ	فـ	ف	/f/
G g	Г г	ـغ	ـغـ	غـ	غ	/g/
H h	Х х	ـح	ـحـ	حـ	ح	/x/
I i	И и	ـ◌ٖـى ـى	ـ◌ٖـٮـ ـىـ	اٖٮـ ٮـ	اٖى ^{[a]} ى	/i/
J j	Ј ј	ـي	ـيـ	يـ	ي	/j/
K k	К к	ـق	ـقـ	قـ	ق	/k/
L l	Л л	ـل	ـلـ	لـ	ل	/l/
Lj lj	Љ љ	ـڵ	ـڵـ	ڵـ	ڵ	/ʎ/
M m	М м	ـم	ـمـ	مـ	م	/m/
N n	Н н	ـن	ـنـ	نـ	ن	/n/
Nj nj	Њ њ	ـںٛ	ـٮٛـ	ٮٛـ	ںٛ ^{[b]}	/ɲ/
O o	О о	ـۉ		ۉ		/o/
P p	П п	ـپ	ـپـ	پـ	پ	/p/
R r	Р р	ـر		ر		/r/
S s	С с	ـس	ـسـ	سـ	س	/s/
Š š	Ш ш	ـش	ـشـ	شـ	ش	/ʃ/
T t	Т т	ـت	ـتـ	تـ	ت	/t/
U u	У у	ـۆ		ۆ		/u/
V v	В в	ـو		و		/v/
Z z	З з	ـز		ز		/z/
Ž ž	Ж ж	ـژ		ژ		/ʒ/

Notes

- ^a The diacritic beneath the ا appears on the letter preceding the ى.
- ^b Mustafić uses ڃ and ݩ instead of and ںٛ for Ć ć/Ћ ћ and Nj nj/Њ њ .
- ^c Mustafić uses ݗ for Đ đ/Ђ ђ, Al-Zubi and Čičak-Al-Zubi use ڠ instead of for Đ đ/Ђ ђ and "ک" instead of "ق" for k/к.
- ^d Al-Zubi and Čičak Al-Zubi (Harfovica Version) use "ائ" instead of "اٖى" for I/И. And "ـٔه" (isolated form) and "ـه" (final form) instead of "ه" Al-Zubi also only use it in the isolated and standard form.

=== Ligatures ===
Like the standard Arabic alphabet, when ا connects to either ل or ڵ a special ligature is used instead.

There's another ligature, one unique to Arebica, that's used. The conjunction "and", which is "i" in Bosnian, is written in a unique way, using the letter waw, graphically matching the corresponding conjunction in Arabic and Turkish, but with a diacritic underneath.

Latin	Cyrillic	Arebica			
Latin	Cyrillic	Contextual forms			Isolated
Latin	Cyrillic	Final	Medial	Initial	Isolated
la	ла	ـلا		لا	
lja	ља	ـڵا		ڵا	
i	и	-		وٖ	

Prior to standardization, the most widespread Arebica conventions were based on Ottoman Turkish conventions, and similar to contemporary aljamiado conventions adopted for Albanian and Greek. Vowels are often written using matres lectionis, with the exception of /e/, which is only represented word-finally, as ⟨ە⟩. /o/ and /u/ are not distinguished. /ɲ/, /ʎ/ and /ts/ were not distinguished from /n/, /l/ and /tʃ/, respectively spelt as ⟨ل⟩, ⟨ن⟩ and ⟨چ⟩. Palatal affricates /tɕ/ and /dʑ/ are both typically spelt as ⟨ك⟩, due to the Persian letter ⟨گ⟩ not having been widely adopted yet, while velar stops /k/ and /g/ are represented with ⟨ق⟩ and ⟨غ⟩.

=== Text examples ===
==== Article 1, Universal Declaration of Human Rights ====
Serbo-Croatian (Arebica): (Note: According to the previous notes and the Lexilogos Arebica keyboard)	سوا ڵۆدسقا بٖىڃا راݗايۆ سە سلۉبۉدنا وٖ يەدناقا ۆ دۉستۉيانستوۆ وٖ پراوٖىما. ۉنا سۆ ۉبدارەنا رازۆمۉم وٖ سوٖىيەشڃۆ وٖ ترەبا دا يەدنۉ پرەما درۆغۉمە پۉستۆپايۆ ۆ دۆحۆ براتستوا.
Serbo-Croatian (Latin):	Sva ljudska bića rađaju se slobodna i jednaka u dostojanstvu i pravima. Ona su obdarena razumom i sviješću i treba da jedno prema drugome postupaju u duhu bratstva.
Serbo-Croatian (Cyrillic):	Сва људска бића рађају се слободна и једнака у достојанству и правима. Она су обдарена разумом и свијешћу и треба да једно према другоме поступају у духу братства.
English:	All human beings are born free and equal in dignity and rights. They are endowed with reason and conscience and should act towards one another in a spirit of brotherhood.

==== Tehran ====
Serbo-Croatian (Arebica):	تەحەران يە غلاونٖى وٖ نايوەڃٖى غراد اٖىرانا, سيەدٖىشتە تەحەرانسقە پۉقرايٖىنە وٖ يەدان ۉد نايوەڃٖىح غرادۉوا سوٖىيەتا.
Serbo-Croatian (Latin):	Teheran je glavni i najveći grad Irana, sjedište Teheranske pokrajine i jedan od najvećih gradova svijeta.
Serbo-Croatian (Cyrillic):	Техеран је главни и највећи град Ирана, сједиште Техеранске покрајине и један од највећих градова свијета.
English:	Tehran is the capital and largest city of Iran, capital of Tehran Province and one of the largest cities in the world.

== See also ==
- Aljamiado
- Belarusian Arabic alphabet, another script used by Slavic-speaking Muslims
- Chirvat-türkisi
- Gaj's Latin alphabet
- Muhamed Hevaji Uskufi Bosnevi
- Sevdah

== Bibliography ==
- Fidahić, Besmir (2020). Linguistic Justice at the International Criminal Tribunal for the Former Yugoslavia. Newcastle upon Tyne: Cambridge Scholars Publishing. ISBN 9781527562691.
- Mønnesland, Svein (2012). "Language Policy in Bosnia and Herzegovina". In Koskensalo, Annikki; Smeds, John; De Cillia, Rudolf; Huguet, Angel (eds.). Language: Competence, Change, Contact. Münster: Lit Verlag. ISBN 9783643108012.
- Vidović, Domagoj (2023). "Hrvatski jezik u Bosni i Hercegovini nekad i sad" [The Croatian language in Bosnia and Herzegovine before and today]. Hrvatski jezik (in Croatian) (1): 1–5.
- Enciklopedija leksikografskog zavoda, entry: Arabica. Jugoslavenski leksikografski zavod, Zagreb, 1966
- Online Text Converter from Latin or Cyrillic to Arebica Script, Language institute of the University of Sarajevo https://www.e-bosanski.ba/konverter-pisama/bosanska-arebica/
