= Smederevo–Vršac dialect =

Dialect of Shtokavian supradialect of Serbo-Croatian language

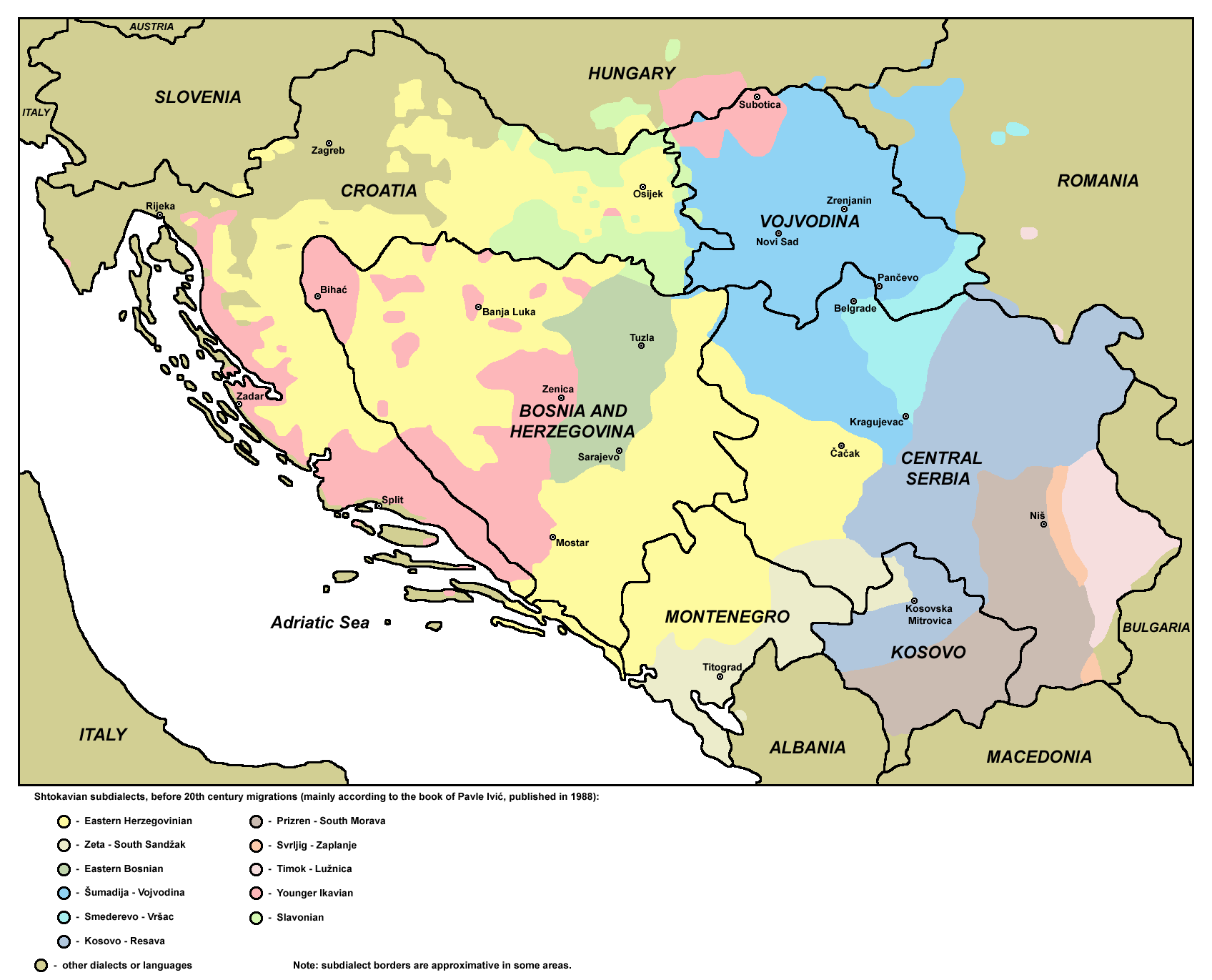
Map of Shtokavian subdialects prior to the 20th-century migrations; Smederevo–Vršac subdialect area shown in light blue

Smederevo–Vršac dialect (Serbo-Croatian: смедеревско-вршачки дијалект / smederevsko-vršački dijalekt) is a dialect of Shtokavian supradialect of Serbo-Croatian language, dominantly of Ekavian pronunciation. As an Old Shtokavian variety, it retains a number of features not found in Neo-Shtokavian varieties on which standards of Serbo-Croatian are based.

== Geographical distribution ==
The dialect is mainly spoken in Serbia or more exactly in eastern half of Šumadija (area between Smederevo and Kragujevac), Braničevo region, and southernmost part of Banat (area between Kovin and Vršac).

== Characteristics ==
The Smederevo–Vršac dialect is a mixed speech of populations that speak Šumadija–Vojvodina and Kosovo–Resava dialects. It is, however, linguistically closer to the Kosovo–Resava dialect and it is sometimes classified as a sub-dialect of the Kosovo–Resava dialect.

== See also ==
- Serbian language
