= Zupci (Bar Municipality) =

Zupci Зупци
- Village
- Location within Montenegro
- Coordinates: 42.128094°N 19.121701°E
- Country: Montenegro
- Municipality: Bar

Population (2011)
  - Total: 136
- Time zone: UTC+1 (CET)
  - Summer (DST): UTC+2 (CEST)

Zupci (Montenegrin Cyrillic: Зупци) is a village in the municipality of Bar, Montenegro.

== Demographics ==
According to the 2011 census, its population was 136.

Ethnicity in 2011
Ethnicity	Number	Percentage
Montenegrins	110	80.9%
Serbs	15	11.0%
other/undeclared	11	8.1%
Total	136	100%
