= List of Serbo-Croatian words of Greek origin =

Greek influence was widespread throughout the Balkans during the Middle Ages, influencing the languages within it, including Serbo-Croatian. Many words of Greek origin were borrowed from other languages, while most others came via contact with the Greeks. Some words are present and common in the modern vernaculars of Serbo-Croatian: hiljada (хиљада), tiganj (тигањ), patos (патос). Almost every word of the Serbian Orthodox ceremonies are of Greek origin: parastos (парастос).

- AG stands for Ancient Greek origin.
- MG stands for Modern Greek origin.
- C stands for Cyrillic (script).
- L stands for Latin (script).

Serbo-Croatian (L)	Serbo-Croatian (C)	Greek (L)	Greek	English meaning	Notes
afrodizijak	афродизијак	áfrodisiakós	ἀφροδισιακός	aphrodisiac	AG
azot	азот	ázōtos	ἀζωτος	Nitrogen	via French ← Latin ← AG (coined in French, based on AG) Synonym (in Croatian dialects) = dušik
bar	бар	varós	βάρος	bar (unit of pressure)	AG
biber	бибер	piperiá	πιπεριά	pepper	via Turkish; Synonym (in Croatian dialects) = papar
crkva	црква	kyriakón	κυριακόν	church	via Proto-Slavic ← Old High German ← AG
cvekla	цвекла			red beet	Proto-Slavic ← Medieval Greek ← AG; Synonym (in Croatian dialects) = cikla
čempres	чемпрес	kypárissos	κυπάρισσος	cypress	via Dalmatian ← Latin
ćuprija	ћуприја	géfyra	γέφυρα	bridge	via Turkish Synonym = most
delfin	делфин	delphís	δελφίς	dolphin	via Latin ← AG
drum	друм	drómos	δρόμος	road Synonym (in Croatian dialects) = cesta; (in all Serbo-Croatian dialects) = put	
dupin	дупин	delphís	δελφίς	dolphin	via Dalmatian ← Latin ← AG
đak	ђак	diákos	διάκος	student, pupil	via Medieval Latin
đakon	ђакон	diákonos	διάκονος	deacon	via Medieval Latin
đubre	ђубре	kópros	κόπρος	garbage, trash; manure; bad and immoral person	via Ottoman Turkish ← AG Synonym (in all Serbo-Croatian dialects) = smeće
efendija	ефендија	afthéntis	αὐθέντης	effendi	via Ottoman Turkish
episkop	епископ	épískopos	ἐπίσκοπος	bishop	AG Synonym (in Croatian dialects) = biskup
etika	етика	ḗthikós	ἠθικός	ethics	AG
etnika	етника	éthnikós	ἐθνικός	ethnic group (people, nation)	
fazan	фазан	phasianós	φασιανός	pheasant	via German ← Latin ← AG
feniks	феникс	phoȋniks	φοῖνιξ	phoenix	AG
gitara	гитара	kithára	κιθάρα	guitar	via Spanish ← AG
guma	гума	kómmi	κόμμι	rubber	via Latin ← AG, originally Egyptian
haos	хаос	kháos	χάος	chaos	AG; Synonym (in Croatian dialects) = kaos
hartija	хартија	khartí	χαρτί	paper	Synonym (in all Serbo-Croatian dialects) = papir
hiljada	хиљада	khiliás	χιλιάς	[a] thousand (1000)	AG; Synonym (in Croatian dialects) = tisuća
hlor	хлор	χλωρός	khlōrós	chlorine	AG; Synonym (in Croatian dialects) = klor
hor	хор	khorós	χορός	chorus, choir	Synonym (in Croatian dialects) = kor
idiot	идиот	idiṓtēs	ἰδιώτης	idiot	via Latin ← AG
ikona	икона	eikóna	εικόνα	icon	
ironija	иронија	eírōneía	ειρωνεία	irony	AG
istorija	историја	istoría	ἱστορία	history	AG; Bosnian form of historija is derived from the Latin historia; in standard Croatian, historija denotes the academic study of history, while preferring povijest for history as a past reality. Ekavian form povest is seldom used in Serbia.
kada	када	kádos	κάδος	bathtub	via Latin ← AG
kalem	калем	kálamos	κάλαμος	reel	via Turkish ← Arabic ← AG
kamin	камин	káminos	κάμινος	hearth, fireplace	via Latin ← AG
keramika	керамика	keramikós	κεραμικός	ceramics	AG
kesten	кестен	kástana	κάστανα	chestnut	via Turkish ← AG
kit	кит	kȇtos	κῆτος	whale	AG
klisura	клисура	kleisoúra	κλεισούρα	gorge	Medieval Greek
komad	комад	kommátion	κομμάτιον	piece, part, parcel, fragment	AG
kopito	копито	kopto		hoof	
kreda	креда	Krḗtē	Κρήτη	chalk, Cretaceous	via Latin ← AG
krevet	крeвет	kreváti (MG) / krábbatos (AG)	κρεβάτι (MG) / κράββατος (AG)	bed	via Ottoman Turkish ← MG ← AG
kutija	кутија	koutí	κουτί	box	via Ottoman Turkish ← AG
livada	ливада	livádi	λιβάδι	meadow	MG
mana	мана	mánna	μάννα	manna	via Latin ← AG, originally Hebrew
manastir	манастир	monastḗrion	μοναστήριον	monastery, cloister	via Latin ← AG; Synonym (in Croatian dialects) = samostan
melodija	мелодија	melōidía	μελῳδία	melody	via Latin ← AG
miris	мирис	mýron	μύρον	smell	AG
mirodija	миродија	myrodiá	μυρωδιά	aromatic spice	MG
mit	мит	mŷthos	μῦθος	myth	AG
muzej	музеј	Μουσεῖον	Mouseîon	museum	via Latin ← AG
nafta	нафта	náphtha	νάφθα	petroleum, diesel fuel (slang)	via Latin ← AG
okean	океан	ṓkeanós	ὠκεανός	ocean	via Latin ← AG; Synonym (in Croatian dialects) = ocean
orgazam	оргазам	orgasmós	οργασμός	orgasm	via Latin ← AG
orgija	оргија	órgia	ὄργια	orgy	AG
papa	папа	papás	παπάς	Pope	via Latin ← AG
patos	патос	pátos	πάτος	floor	AG; Synonym (in all Serbo-Croatian dialects) = pod
pâtos	па̂тос	páthos	πάθος	pathos	AG
paranoja	параноја	paránoia	παράνοια	paranoia	via Neo-Latin ← AG
parastos	парастос	parástasis	παράστασις	dirge	
pasulj	пасуљ	fasóli (MG) / phásēlos (AG)	φασόλι (MG) / φάσηλος (AG)	bean	via Hungarian ← MG ← AG; Synonym (in Croatian dialects) = grah
pauza	пауза	paûsis	παῦσις	pause	via German ← Latin ← AG
pita	пита	píta	πίτα	pie, pita	via Turkish ← Medieval Greek
plastika	пластика	plastikós	πλαστικός	plastic	via Latin
pleroma	плерома	plḗrōma	πλήρωμα	Pleroma	AG
pop	поп	papás	παπάς	priest	via Proto-Slavic ← Old German German ← AG
praksa	пракса	prȃksis	πρᾶξις	usage, use, practice, profession	AG
putir	путир	potḗr	ποτήρ	chalice	AG; Synonym (in Croatian dialects) = kalež
sfera	сфера	sphaĩra	σφαῖρα	sphere	AG
sidro	сидро	sídiros	σίδηρος	anchor	
sistem	систем	sýstema	σύστημα	system	AG
skandal	скандал	skándalon	σκάνδαλον	scandal	via German ← Latin ← AG
stadion	стадион	stádion	στάδιον	stadium, stadion	AG
subota	субота	sávvaton	σάββατον	Saturday	via Latin ← AG, originally Hebrew
sulundar	сулундар	sōlēnárion	σωληνάριον	stove-pipe	via Turkish ← MG ← AG
talas	талас	thálassa	θάλασσα	wind wave	via Turkish ← AG; Synonym (in western Serbo-Croatian dialects) = val
talenat	таленат	tálanton	τάλαντον	talent	AG;
tehnika	техника	tekhnikós	τεχνικός	technique, technology	AG
tiganj	тигањ	tigáni	τηγάνι	pan (saucepan)	via Turkish
tip	тип	týpos	τύπος	type	AG

== See also ==
- Arabic-Persian-Greek-Serbian Conversation Textbook
