= Miloš Okuka =

Miloš Okuka (born August 2, 1944) is a Serbian linguist, Slavist, dialectologist and literature historian.

He was born in the village of Porije, near Ulog in Bosnia and Herzegovina. After teaching as a professor at the Faculty of Philosophy in Sarajevo, from 1992 until 2009, he served as a lecturer at LMU Munich.

In 2017, Miloš Okuka has signed the Declaration on the Common Language of the Croats, Serbs, Bosniaks and Montenegrins.

== Published works ==
He published several hundred papers, and the following books:

- Sava Mrkalj als Reformator der serbischen Kyrilliza (Munich, 1975)
- Govor Rame (Sarajevo, 1983)
- Jezik i politika (Sarajevo, 1983)
- Priče o oblicima riječi (Sarajevo, 1984)
- U Vukovo doba (Sarajevo, 1987)
- Ogledi o našem književnom djelu (Nikšić, 1990)
- A Bibliography of Recent Literature on Macedonian, Serbo-Croatian, and Slovene languages (Munich, 1990, with Rada Lenecka)
- Književni jezik u Bosni i Hercegovini od Vuka Karadžića do kraja austrougarske vladavine (Munich, 1991, with Ljilana Stančić)
- Eine Sprache - viele Erben' (Klagenfurt, 1998)
- Bosna i Hercegovina prije 100 godina u riječi i slici - Bosnien-Hercegowina vor 100 Jahren in Wort und Bild - Bosnia and Hercegovina from 100 years ago (Munich - Banjaluka, 1990, with Meha Šoše)
- Deutsch-serbische Kulturbeziehungen im Spiegel des Volksliedes (Hamburg, 2003)
- Srpski na križnom putu (Istočno Sarajevo, 2006)
- Srpski dijalekti, (2008)

Together with Josip Baotić, Miloš Kovačević and Čedomir Rebić, he authored four Serbo-Croatian textbooks for gymnasiums and high-schools in Bosnia and Hercegovina (Sarajevo, 1998–1992). For a number of years he served as the editor-in-chief of the journal Književni jezik. He edited and published several proceedings, lexicons and anthologies:

- Das zerrissene Herz. Reisen durch Bosnien- Herzegowina 1530-1993. (Munich, 1994, with Petra Rehder)
- Traumreisen und Grenzermessungen: Reisende aus fünf Jahrhunderten über Slowenien (Klagenfurt, 1995, with Klaus Olof)
- Dobra zemljo šapni kroz zgnječene vlati : srpska književnost Bosne i Hercegovine od Ljubavića do danas (Banja Luka, 2001)
- Terra Bosna (Klagenfurt, 2002, with Ger Fischer)
- Lexikon der Sprachen das europäischen Ostens (Klagenfurt, 2002)
- Hrvatska književnost Bosne i Hercegovine od XV. stoljeća do danas (Sarajevo, 2002)
- Germano-Slavische Beiträge (Munich, 2004, with Ulrich Schweier)
- Hrvatska književnost Bosne i Hercegovine koncem XIX. i prve polovice XX. stoljeća. (Sarajevo, 2005)
- Kvarner (Klagenfurt, 2007, with Ger Fischer)
- Pojanja i kazivanja u skrbna i besudna vremena. Književnojezička baština bosanskih i hercegovačkih Srba pod turskom vlašću (Istočno Sarajevo, 2007)
- Mostar (Klagenfurt, 2008, with Ger Fischer)

== Sources ==
- Okuka, Miloš (2008), Srpski dijalekti, SKD Prosvjeta
