= Chirvat-türkisi =

Croatian manuscript song from the 16th century

Chirvat-türkisi (English: Croatian Folk); Serbo-Croatian: Hrvatska turćija, sometimes also Hrvatska pjesma or Pjesma na hrvatskom) or Ah nevista, duša moja (Oh bride, my soul) is a Serbo-Croatian folk love poem first recorded in 1588/89.

Chirvat-türkisi is of oral lyrical tradition and is considered to be a forerunner of Sevdalinka, the traditional folk genre in Bosnia and Herzegovina. It is assumed that the poem also had a musical background. The poem also has some Croatian Petrarchan elements.

The poem's authorship remains unknown; however, it was recorded and collected by Mehmed of Transylvania in 1588/89. It was first published by Friedrich von Kraelitz in the magazine Archiv für slavische Philologie in 1911.
