= Dialects of Macedonian =

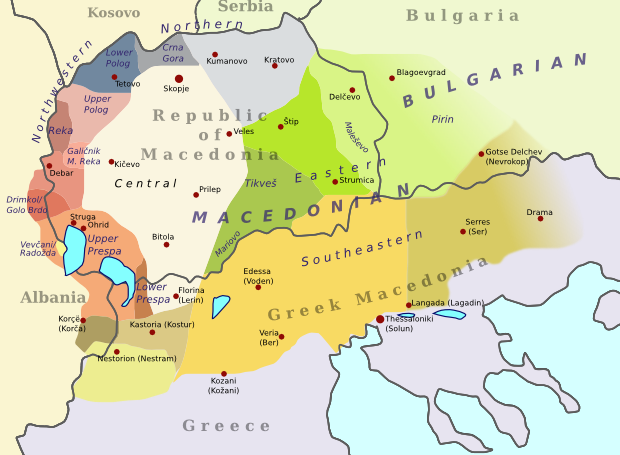
Map of the dialects of the Macedonian Language

The dialects of Macedonian comprise the Slavic dialects spoken in the Republic of North Macedonia as well as some varieties spoken in the wider geographic region of Macedonia. They are part of the dialect continuum of South Slavic languages that joins Macedonian with Bulgarian to the east and Torlakian to the north into the group of the Eastern South Slavic languages. The precise delimitation between these languages is fleeting and controversial.

== Classification ==
Macedonian authors tend to treat all dialects spoken in the geographical region of Macedonia as Macedonian, including those spoken in the westernmost part of Bulgaria (so-called Pirin Macedonia), whereas Bulgarian authors treat all Macedonian dialects as part of the Bulgarian language. Prior to the codification of standard Macedonian in 1945, the dialects of Macedonia were for the most part classified as Bulgarian. In Greece, the identification of the dialects spoken by the local Slavophone minority with either Bulgarian or Macedonian is often avoided, and these dialects are instead described simply as "Slavic", Dopia ('Local'), Stariski (old) or Našinski (ours).

Most Western linguists classify the dialects in the Pirin (Blagoevgrad) region of Bulgaria and in the far east of Greek Macedonia as Bulgarian and the dialects in the rest of Greece and in North Macedonia as Macedonian. According to Chambers and Trudgill, the question whether Bulgarian and Macedonian are distinct languages or dialects of a single language as well as where the exact boundary between the two languages is cannot be resolved on a purely linguistic basis, but should rather take into account sociolinguistic criteria, i.e., ethnic and linguistic identity. As for the Slavic dialects of Greece, Trudgill classifies the dialects in the east Greek Macedonia as part of the Bulgarian language area and the rest as Macedonian dialects.

According to Riki van Boeschoten, the dialects in eastern Greek Macedonia (around Serres and Drama) are closest to Bulgarian, those in western Greek Macedonia (around Florina and Kastoria) are closest to Macedonian, while those in the centre (Edessa and Salonica) are intermediate between the two. Jouko Lindstedt also opines that the dividing line between Macedonian and Bulgarian should be defined by the linguistic identity of the speakers, i.e., by the state border:

Macedonian dialectology... considers the dialects of south-western Bulgaria to be Macedonian, despite the lack of any widespread Macedonian national consciousness in that area. The standard map is provided by Vidoeski. It would be futile to tell an ordinary citizen of the Macedonian capital, Skopje, that they do not realise that they are actually speaking Bulgarian. It would be equally pointless to tell citizens of the southwestern Bulgarian town of Blagoevgrad that they (or at least their compatriots in the surrounding countryside) do not ‘really’ speak Bulgarian, but Macedonian. In other words, regardless of the structural and linguistic arguments put forth by a majority of Bulgarian dialectologists, as well as by their Macedonian counterparts, they are ignoring one, essential fact – that the present linguistic identities of the speakers themselves in various regions do not always correspond to the prevailing nationalist discourses.

Linguistically, the dialects of Macedonia in the wider sense can be divided into Eastern and Western groups (the boundary runs approximately from Skopje and Skopska Crna Gora along the rivers Vardar and Crna) based on a large group of features. In addition, a more detailed classification can be based on the modern reflexes of the Proto-Slavic reduced vowels ("yers"), vocalic sonorants and the back nasal (o). That classification distinguishes between the following 3 major groups:

== Dialects ==
- Macedonian
  - Northern dialects
    - Western group:
      - Tetovo dialect
      - Skopska Crna Gora dialect
      - Gora dialect
    - Eastern group:
      - Kumanovo dialect
      - Kratovo dialect
      - Kriva Palanka dialect
      - Ovče Pole dialect
  - Western Dialects:
    - Central group:
      - Prilep-Bitola dialect
      - Kičevo-Poreče dialect
      - Skopje-Veles dialect
    - Western and north western group:
      - Gostivar dialect
      - Reka dialect
      - Galičnik (Mala Reka) dialect
      - Debar dialect
      - Drimkol-Golo Brdo dialect
      - Vevčani-Radožda dialect
      - Struga dialect
      - Ohrid dialect
      - Upper Prespa dialect
      - Lower Prespa dialect
  - Eastern and Southern dialects
    - Eastern group:
      - Tikveš-Mariovo dialect
      - Štip-Kočani dialect
      - Strumica dialect
      - Maleševo-Pirin dialect^{1}
    - South-western group:^{1}
      - Nestram-Kostenar dialect
      - Korča (Gorica) dialect
      - Kostur dialect
    - South-eastern group:
      - Solun-Voden dialect^{1}
      - Ser-Drama-Lagadin-Nevrokop dialect^{1}

^{1} The Ser-Drama-Lagadin-Nevrokop dialect and the Bulgarian part of the Maleševo-Pirin dialect are classified as Bulgarian by modern Western linguists. The classification of the dialects of central Greek Macedonia is more unclear, with some linguists classifying them as Macedonian and others as transitional between Macedonian and Bulgarian.

== Variation in consonants ==
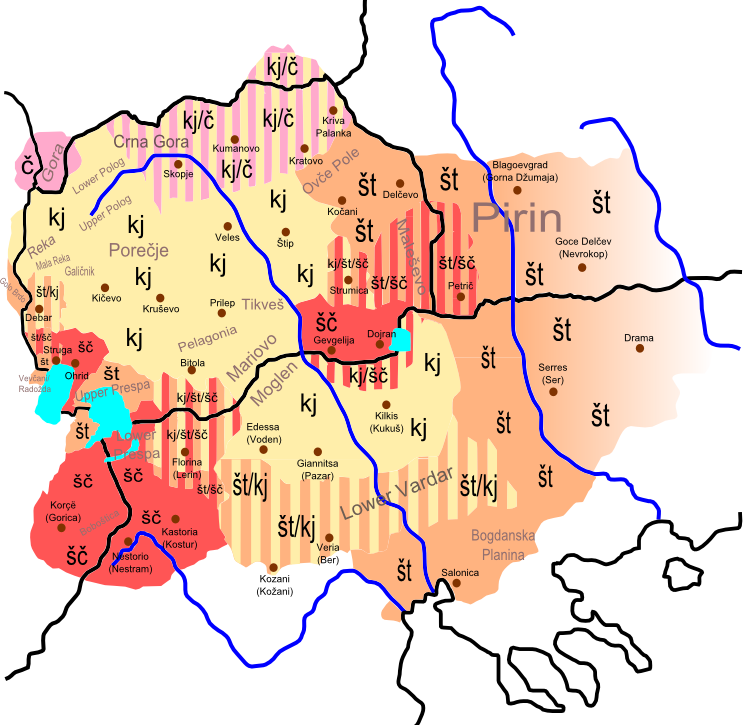
Map of the phoneme kj in the wider Macedonian region

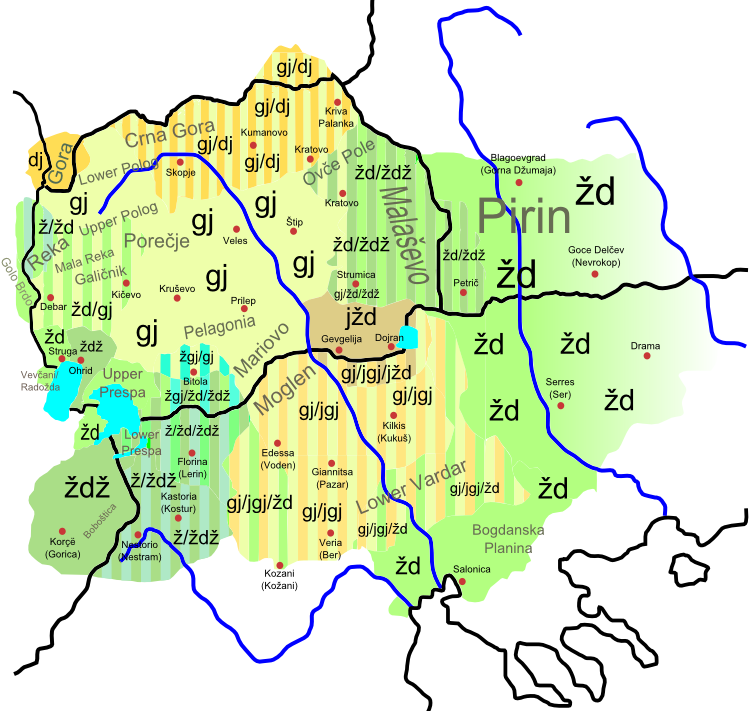
Map of the phoneme gj in the wider Macedonian region

As far as consonantal features are concerned, the entire Western region is distinguished from the East by loss of /x/ (except Tetovo, Gora and Korča) and the loss of /v/ in the intervocalic position (except Mala Reka and parts of Kostur-Korča): /ɡlava/ (head) = /ɡla/, /ɡlavi/ (heads) = /ɡlaj/. The Eastern region preserves /x/ (except Tikveš-Mariovo and Kumanovo-Kriva Palanka) and intervocalic /v/. The East is also characterised by the development of epenthetic /v/ before original /o/ where the West has epenthetic /j/: Eastern /vaɡlɛn/ (coal) but Western /jaɡlɛn/. The diphonemic reflexes are most characteristic of the dialects of Greek Macedonia and Blagoevgrad Province, Kostur-Korča and Ohrid-Prespa. The Serres – Nevrokop dialects have a series of phonemically palatalised consonants.

== Variation in word stress and its effects on vowels ==
The Western dialects generally have fixed stress, antepenultimate in the Republic of North Macedonia, and penultimate in Greece and Albania. The Eastern region, along with the neighbouring Bulgarian dialects, has various non-fixed stress systems. In Lower Vardar and Serres-Nevrokop unstressed /a, ɛ, ɔ/ are reduced (raised) to [ə, i, u]. The reduction of unstressed vowels (as well as the aforementioned allophonic palatalisation of consonants) is characteristic of East Bulgarian as opposed to West Bulgarian dialects, so these dialects are regarded by Bulgarian linguists as transitional between East and West Bulgarian.
