= Languages of the Balkans =

Overview of Balkan languages

This is a list of languages spoken in the Balkan countries. With the exception of several Turkic languages and Hungarian, all of them belong to the Indo-European family. Despite belonging to four different families of Indo-European; Slavic, Romance, Greek, and Albanian, a subset of these languages is notable for forming a well-studied Balkan sprachbund, a group of languages that have developed some striking structural similarities over time.

== Indo-European languages ==
=== Germanic ===
- Yiddish (Slovenia, Romania)
- Austrian German (Slovenia)

=== Albanian ===
- Albanian
  - Gheg
    - Istrian
  - Tosk
    - Arbëresh
    - Arvanitika
      - Northwestern Arvanitika
      - Southcentral Arvanitika
      - Thracian Arvanitika

=== Hellenic languages ===
- Greek
  - Cappadocian Greek
  - Pontic Greek
  - Cretan Greek
  - Tsakonian Greek

=== Indo-Aryan languages ===
- Romani

=== Slavic languages ===
==== Eastern South Slavic ====
- Bulgarian
- Macedonian

==== Transitional dialects ====
- Transitional Bulgarian dialects
- Transitional Serbo-Croatian dialects (Gorani/Torlakian)

==== East Slavic ====
- Pannonian Rusyn

==== Western South Slavic ====
- Slovene
- Serbo-Croatian with standardized varieties based on the Shtokavian dialect:
  - Bosnian
  - Croatian
  - Montenegrin
  - Serbian

==== Regiolects ====
- Chakavian
- Kajkavian

=== Romance languages ===
- Aromanian
- Istriot (in western Istria)
- Istro-Romanian (In eastern Istria)
- Italian (on the Adriatic coast)
- Ladino (in Greece, Turkey, Bosnia, Serbia, North Macedonia, Bulgaria, Croatia, Romania)
- Megleno-Romanian (Meglenenitic)
- Romanian
- Moldovan

== Turkic languages ==
- Crimean Tatar
- Gagauz
- Tatar
- Turkish
  - Ottoman Turkish

== Ugric languages ==
- Hungarian

== Extinct languages ==
These are the extinct languages that were spoken in the Balkans in classical antiquity:

- Illyrian (perhaps related with Albanian language)
- Thracian
- Dacian
- Phrygian (perhaps related with Hellenic languages)
- Paeonian
- Dalmatian
- Eteocretan
- Eteocypriot
- Lemnian
- Liburnian

== See also ==
- Southeast Europe
- Paleo-Balkan languages
- Languages of Europe
