= Balkan sprachbund =

Shared linguistic features in southeastern Europe

Balkan
- Geographic distribution: Balkans
- Languages: Albanian (especially Tosk) (Indo-European); Balkan Gagauz Turkish (Turkic); Balkan Romani (Indo-European); Bulgarian (Indo-European); Eastern Romance (Indo-European); Hellenic (Indo-European); Macedonian (Indo-European); Torlak dialects (Indo-European)

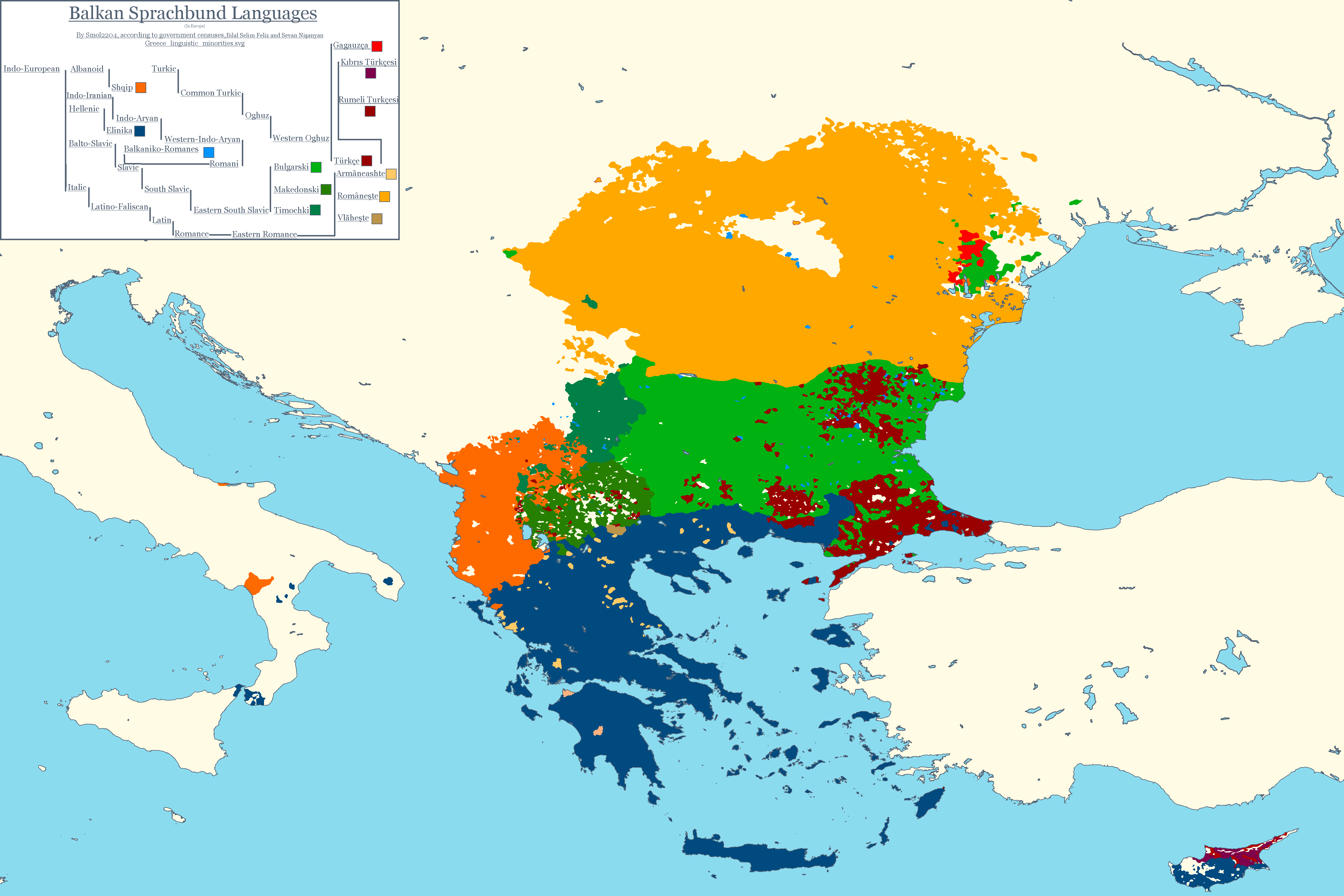
Languages of the Balkan Sprachbund in the East and South Balkans, Cyprus and Italy

The Balkan sprachbund or Balkan language area is a proposed theory of an ensemble of areal features—similarities in grammar, syntax, vocabulary and phonology—among the languages of the Balkans. Several features are found across these languages though not all apply to every single language.

The languages of the Balkans share their similarities despite belonging to various separate language family (genetic) branches. The Slavic, Hellenic, Romance and Albanian branches all belong to the large Indo-European family, and the Turkish language is non-Indo-European.

Some of the languages use these features for their standard language (i.e. those whose homeland lies almost entirely within the region) whilst other populations to whom the land is not a cultural pivot (as they have wider outside communities) may still adopt the features for their local register.

While some of these languages may share little vocabulary, their grammars exhibit extensive similarities; for example:

- They have similar case systems, those that have preserved grammatical case and verb conjugation systems.
- They have all become more analytic, although to differing degrees.
- Some of those languages mark evidentiality, which is uncommon among Indo-European languages, and was likely inspired by contact with Turkish.

The existence of the Balkan sprachbund has not gained widely acceptance among linguists as is explained below, and the reason for these similarities is not a settled question among experts. Genetic commonalities, language contact, and the geopolitical history of the region all seem to be relevant factors, but many disagree over the specifics and degree of these factors.

== History and criticism ==
The earliest scholar to notice the similarities between Balkan languages belonging to different families was the Slovenian scholar Jernej Kopitar in 1829. August Schleicher (1850) more explicitly developed the concept of areal relationships as opposed to genetic ones, and Franz Miklosich (1861) studied the relationships of Balkan Slavic and Romance more extensively.

Nikolai Trubetzkoy (1923), Kristian Sandfeld-Jensen (1926), and Gustav Weigand (1925, 1928) developed the theory in the 1920s and 1930s.

In the 1930s, the Romanian linguist Alexandru Graur criticized the notion of "Balkan linguistics," saying that one can talk about "relationships of borrowings, of influences, but not about Balkan linguistics".

The term "Balkan language area" was coined by the Romanian linguist Alexandru Rosetti in 1958, when he claimed that the shared features conferred the Balkan languages a special similarity. Theodor Capidan went further, claiming that the structure of Balkan languages could be reduced to a standard language. Many of the earliest reports on this theory were in German, hence the term "Balkansprachbund" is often used as well.

== Languages ==
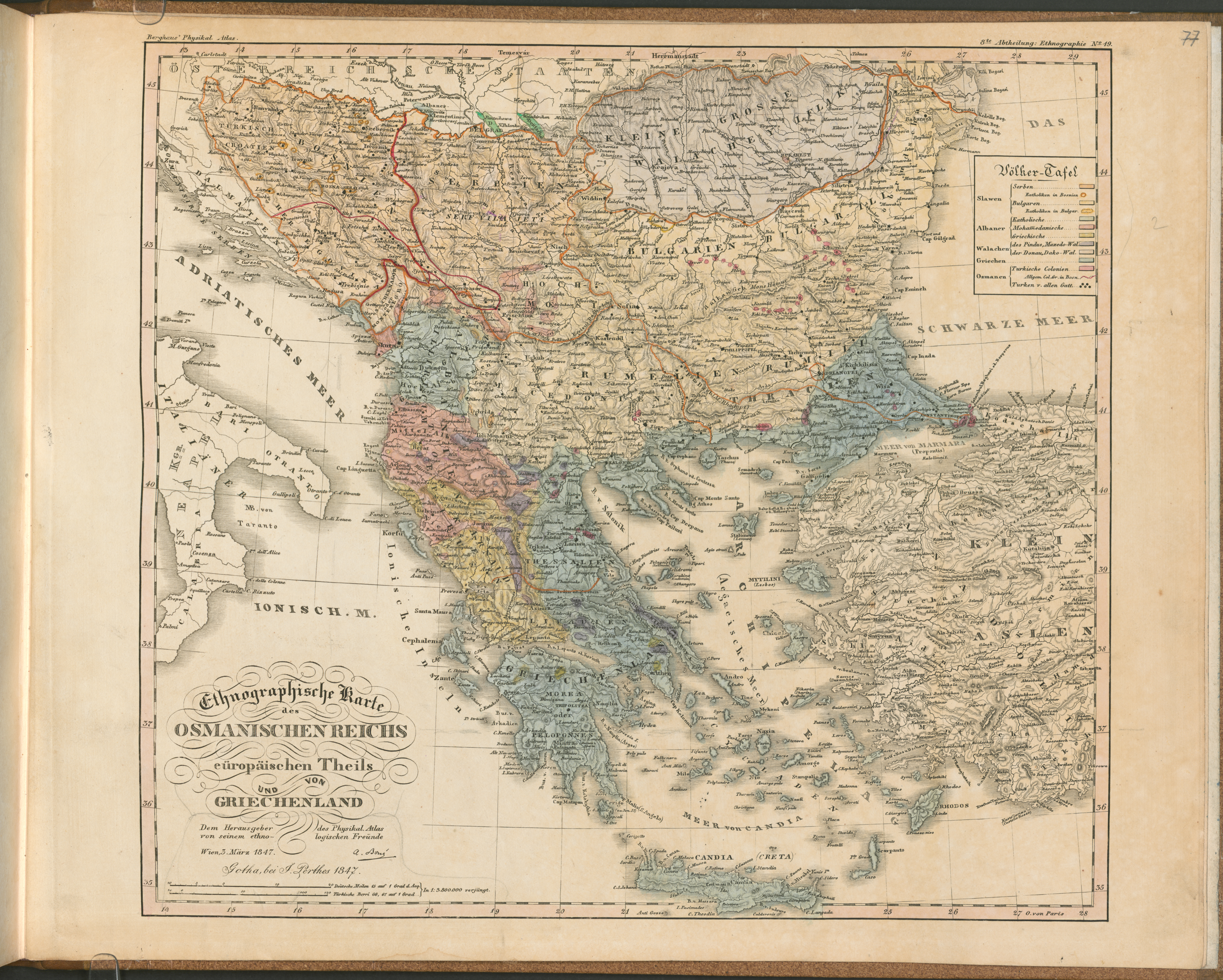
1847 ethnographic map

The languages that share these similarities belong to five distinct branches of the Indo-European languages:

- Indo-European languages
  - Albanian
    - Tosk
    - Gheg
  - Eastern Romance
    - Aromanian
    - Northern Romanian
      - Eastern Romanian
        - Megleno-Romanian
        - Romanian
      - Istro-Romanian
  - Hellenic
    - Greek
  - Indo-Aryan
    - Romani
  - South Slavic
    - Eastern South Slavic
      - Bulgarian
      - Macedonian
      - Torlak
    - Western South Slavic
      - Serbo-Croatian
      - Slovenian

In 2000, the Finnish linguist Jouko Lindstedt computed a Balkanization factor, which gives each Balkan language a score proportional to the number of features shared in the Balkan language area. The results were:

Language	Score
Macedonian	12
Bulgarian and Torlak	11.5
Albanian	10.5
Eastern Romance	9.5
Greek	9.5
Balkan Romani	7.5

Another language that may have been influenced by the Balkan language union is the Judaeo-Spanish variant that used to be spoken by Sephardi Jews living in the Balkans. The grammatical features shared (especially regarding the tense system) were most likely borrowed from Greek.

== Origins ==
The source of these features as well as the directions have long been debated, and various theories were suggested.

=== Paleo-Balkan ===
Early researchers, including Kopitar, believed they must have been inherited from the Paleo-Balkan languages (e.g. Illyrian, Thracian and Dacian) which formed the substrate for modern Balkan languages. But since very little is known about Paleo-Balkan languages, it cannot be determined whether the features were present. The strongest candidate for a shared Paleo-Balkan feature is the postposed article.

=== Greek ===
Another theory, advanced by Kristian Sandfeld in 1930, was that these features were an entirely Greek influence, under the presumption that since Greece "always had a superior civilization compared to its neighbours", Greek could not have borrowed its linguistic features from them. However, no ancient dialects of Greek possessed Balkanisms, so that the features shared with other regional languages appear to be post-classical innovations. Also, Greek appears to be only peripheral to the Balkan language area, lacking some important features, such as the postposed article. Nevertheless, several of the features that Greek does share with the other languages (loss of dative, replacement of infinitive by subjunctive constructions, object clitics, formation of future with auxiliary verb "to want") probably originated in Medieval Greek and spread to the other languages through Byzantine influence.

=== Latin and Romance ===
The Roman Empire ruled all the Balkans, and local variation of Latin may have left its mark on all languages there, which were later the substrate to Slavic newcomers. This was proposed by Georg Solta. The weak point of this theory is that other Romance languages have few of the features, and there is no proof that the Eastern Romans were isolated for enough time to develop them. An argument for this would be the structural borrowings or "linguistic calques" into Macedonian from Aromanian, which could be explained by Aromanian being a substrate of Macedonian, but this still does not explain the origin of these innovations in Aromanian. The analytic perfect with the auxiliary verb "to have" (which some Balkan languages share with Western European languages), is the only feature whose origin can fairly safely be traced to Latin.

=== Multiple sources ===
The most commonly accepted theory, advanced by Polish scholar Zbigniew Gołąb, is that the innovations came from different sources and the languages influenced each other: some features can be traced from Latin, Slavic, or Greek languages, whereas others, particularly features that are shared only by Romanian, Albanian, Macedonian and Bulgarian, could be explained by the substratum kept after Romanization (in the case of Romanian) or Slavicization (in the case of Bulgarian). Albanian was influenced by both Latin and Slavic, but it kept many of its original characteristics.

Several arguments favour this theory. First, throughout the turbulent history of the Balkans, many groups of people moved to another place, inhabited by people of another ethnicity. These small groups were usually assimilated quickly and sometimes left marks in the new language they acquired. Second, the use of more than one language was common in the Balkans before the modern age, and a drift in one language would quickly spread to other languages. Third, the dialects that have the most "balkanisms" are those in regions where people had contact with people of many other languages.

== Features ==
=== Grammatical features ===
==== Case system ====
The number of cases is reduced, several cases being replaced with prepositions, the only exception being Serbo-Croatian. In Bulgarian and Macedonian, on the other hand, this development has actually led to the loss of all cases except the vocative.

A common case system of a Balkan language is:

- Nominative
- Accusative
- Dative/genitive (merged)
- Vocative

===== Syncretism of genitive and dative =====
In the Balkan languages, the genitive and dative cases (or corresponding prepositional constructions) undergo syncretism.

Example:

Language	Dative	Genitive
English	I gave the book to Maria.	It is Maria's book.
Albanian	Librin ia dhashë Marisë.	Libri është i Marisë.
Aromanian	Vivlia lju dedu ali Marii.	Vivlia easti ali Marii.
Bulgarian	Дадох книгата на Мария [dadoh knigata na Marija]	Книгата е на Мария [knigata e na Marija]
Romanian	I-am dat cartea Mariei. colloq. for fem. (oblig. for masc.): I-am dat cartea lui Marian.	Cartea este a Mariei. (literally, "The book is Maria's.") or Este cartea Mariei. ("It is Maria's book.") colloq. for fem. (oblig. for masc.): Cartea este a lui Marian.
Macedonian	Ѝ ја дадов книгата на Марија. [ì ja dadov knigata na Marija]	Книгата е на Марија. [knigata e na Marija]
Greek	Έδωσα το βιβλίο στην Μαρία. [édhosa to vivlío stin María] or Έδωσα της Μαρίας το βιβλίο. [édhosa tis Marías to vivlío]	Είναι το βιβλίο της Μαρίας. [íne to vivlío tis Marías]
Greek	Της το έδωσα [tis to édhosa] 'I gave it to her.'	Είναι το βιβλίο της. [íne to vivlío tis] 'It is her book.'

===== Syncretism of locative and directional expressions =====
Language	'in Greece'	'into Greece'
Albanian	në Greqi	për/brenda në Greqi
Aromanian	tu Gãrtsii; tu Grecu	tu Gãrtsii; tu Grecu
Bulgarian	в Гърция (v Gărcija)	в Гърция (v Gărcija)
Greek	στην Ελλάδα (stin Elládha)	στην Ελλάδα (stin Elládha)
Macedonian	во Грција (vo Grcija)	во Грција (vo Grcija)
Romanian*	în Grecia	în Grecia

Note: In Romanian this is an exception, and it only applies when referring to individual countries, e.g. în Germania, în Franța, etc. The rule is that into translates as "la" when trying to express destination, e.g. la Atena, la Madrid, la vale, la mare, etc.

==== Verb tenses ====
===== Future tense =====
The future tense is formed in an analytic way using an auxiliary verb or particle with the meaning "will, want", referred to as de-volitive, similar to the way the future is formed in English. This feature is present to varying degrees in each language. Decategorization is less advanced in fossilized literary Romanian voi and in Serbo-Croatian ću, ćeš, će, where the future marker is still an inflected auxiliary. In modern Greek, Bulgarian, Macedonian, and Albanian, Aromanian, and spoken Romanian, decategorization and erosion have given rise to an uninflected tense form, where the frozen third-person singular of the verb has turned into an invariable particle followed by the main verb inflected for person (compare Rom 1.sg. voi, 2.sg. vei, 3.sg. va > invariable va > mod. o). Certain Torlak dialects also have an invariant future tense marker in the form of the proclitic third-person-singular present form of the verb 'to want': će vidim (ће видим) 'I will see', će vidiš (ће видиш) "you will see", će vidi (ће види) 'he/she/it will see'.

Language	Variant	Formation	Example: 'I'll see'
Albanian	Tosk	do (invariable) + subjunctive	Do të shoh
Albanian	Gheg	kam (conjugated) + infinitive	Kam me pa
Aromanian		va / u (inv.) + subjunctive	Va s'vedu / u s'vedu
Greek		θα (inv.) + subjunctive	Θα δω / βλέπω (tha dho / vlépo); "I'll see / be seeing"
Bulgarian		ще (inv.) + present tense	Ще видя (shte vidya)
Macedonian		ќе (inv.) + present tense	Ќе видам (kje vidam)
Serbian	(standard Serbian)	хтети / hteti (conjugated) + infinitive	Ја ћу видети (видећу) (ja ću videti [videću])
Serbian	(colloquial Serbian)	хтети / hteti (conjugated) + subjunctive	Ја ћу да видим (ja ću da vidim)
Romanian	(literary, formal)	voi, vei, va, vom, veți, vor + infinitive	Voi vedea
Romanian	(archaic)	va (inv.) + subjunctive	Va să văd
Romanian	(popular)	o (inv.) + subjunctive	O să văd
Romanian	(colloquial alternative)	a avea (conjugated) + subjunctive	Am să văd
Balkan Romani	(Erli)	ka (inv.) + subjunctive	Ka dikhav

===== Analytic perfect tense =====
The analytic perfect tense is formed in the Balkan languages with the verb "to have" and, usually, a past passive participle, similarly to the construction found in Germanic and other Romance languages: e.g. Romanian am promis "I have promised", Albanian kam premtuar "I have promised". A somewhat less typical case of this is Greek, where the verb "to have" is followed by the so-called απαρέμφατο ('invariant form', historically the aorist infinitive): έχω υποσχεθεί. However, a completely different construction is used in Bulgarian and Serbo-Croatian, which have inherited from Common Slavic an analytic perfect formed with the verb "to be" and the past active participle: обещал съм, obeštal sǎm (Bul.) / обећао сам, obećao sam (Ser.) – "I have promised" (lit. "I am having-promised"). On the other hand, Macedonian, the third Slavic language in the sprachbund, is like Romanian and Albanian in that it uses quite typical Balkan constructions consisting of the verb to have and a past passive participle (имам ветено, imam veteno = "I have promised"). Macedonian also has a perfect formed with the verb "to be", like Bulgarian and Serbo-Croatian.

===== Renarrative mood =====
The so-called renarrative mood is another shared feature of the Balkan languages, including Turkish. It is used for statements that are not based on direct observation or common knowledge, but repeat what was reported by others. For example, Патот бил затворен in Macedonian means "The road was closed (or so I heard)". Speakers who use the indicative mood instead and state "Патот беше затворен" imply thereby that they personally witnessed the road's closure.

===== Avoidance or loss of infinitive =====
The use of the infinitive (common in other languages related to some of the Balkan languages, such as Romance and Slavic) is generally replaced with subjunctive constructions, following early Greek innovation.

- in Bulgarian, Macedonian and Tosk Albanian, the loss of the infinitive is complete
- in demotic (vernacular) Greek, the loss of the infinitive was complete, whereas in literary Greek (Katharevousa, abolished in 1976) it was not; the natural fusion of the vernacular with Katharevousa resulted in the creation of the contemporary common Greek (Modern Standard Greek), where the infinitive, when used, is principally used as noun (e.g. λέγειν "speaking, fluency, eloquence", γράφειν "writing", είναι "being", etc.) deriving directly from the ancient Greek infinitive formation. But its substitution by the subjunctive form when the infinitive would be used as a verb is complete. Most of the times, the subjunctive form substitutes the infinitive also in the cases when it would be used as a noun (e.g. το να πας / το να πάει κανείς "to go, the act of going", το να δεις / βλέπεις "to see/be seeing, the act of seeing" instead of the infinitive "βλέπειν", etc.)
- in Aromanian and Southeastern Serbo-Croatian dialects, it is almost complete
- in Gheg Albanian, the infinitive, constructed by the particle "me" plus the past participle, is in full use
- in standard Romanian (prepositional phrase: a + infitive) and Serbo-Croatian, the infinitive shares many of its functions with the subjunctive. In these two languages, the infinitive will always be found in dictionaries and language textbooks. As opposed to the short infinitive (which dropped the final "-re"), Romanian also preserves the original Latin forms of infinitive, ending in (-are, -ere, and -ire), which are predominantely used today as verbal nouns, as an alternative to the short infinitive and subjunctive.
- Turkish as spoken in Sliven and Šumen has also almost completely lost the infinitive, but not verbal nouns using the same grammatical form. This is clearly due to the influence of the Balkan sprachbund.

For example, "I want to write" in several Balkan languages:

Language	Example	Notes
Albanian (Standard, Tosk)	Dua të shkruaj	
Albanian (Gheg)	Due me shkruejt	
Aromanian	Vroi sã sciru / ãngrãpsescu	
Macedonian	Сакам да пишувам [sakam da pišuvam]	
Bulgarian	Искам да пиша [iskam da piša]	
Modern Greek	Θέλω να γράψω [Thélo na grápso]	as opposed to older Greek ἐθέλω γράψαι
Romanian	Vreau să scriu (with subjunctive); Vreau a scrie (with infinitive)	The use of the infinitive is preferred in writing in some cases. In speech it is more commonly used in the northern varieties (Transylvania, Banat, and Moldova) than in Southern varieties (Wallachia) of the language.
Serbo-Croatian	Želim da pišem / Желим да пишем	As opposed to the more literary form: Želim pisati / Желим пиcaти, where pisati / пиcaти is the infinitive. Both forms are grammatically correct in standard Serbian and do not create misunderstandings, although the colloquial one is more commonly used in daily conversation.
Bulgarian Turkish	isterim yazayım	In Standard Turkish in Turkey this is yazmak istiyorum, where yazmak is the infinitive.
Balkan Romani	Mangav te pišinav	Many forms of Romani add the ending -a to express the indicative present, while reserving the short form for the subjunctive serving as an infinitive: for example mangava te pišinav. Some varieties outside the Balkans have been influenced by non-Balkan languages and have developed new infinitives by generalizing one of the finite forms (e.g. Slovak Romani varieties may express "I want to write" as kamav te irinel/pisinel — generalized third person singular – or kamav te irinen/pisinen — generalized third person plural).

But here is an example of a relict form, preserved in Bulgarian:

Language	Without infinitive	With relict "infinitive"	Translation	Notes
Bulgarian	Недей да пишеш.	Недей писа.	Don't write.	The first part of the first three examples is the prohibitative element недей ("don't", composed of не, "not", and дей, "do" in the imperative). The second part of the examples, писа, я, зна and да, are relicts of what used to be an infinitive form (писати, ясти, знати and дати respectively). This second syntactic construction is colloquial and more common in the eastern dialects. The forms usually coincide with the past aorist tense of the verb in the third person singular, as in the case of писа; some that don't coincide (for example доща instead of ще дойда "I will come") are highly unusual today, but do occur, above all in older literature. The last example is found only in some dialects.
Bulgarian	Недей да ядеш.	Недей яде.	Don't eat.	
Bulgarian	Недей да знаеш.	Недей зна.	Don't contradict.	
Bulgarian	Можете ли да ми дадете?	Можете ли ми да̀де?	Can you give me?	
Bulgarian	Недей да четеш	Недей чете	Don't read	

==== Bare subjunctive constructions ====
Sentences that include only a subjunctive construction can be used to express a wish, a mild command, an intention, or a suggestion.

This example translates in the Balkan languages the phrase "You should go!", using the subjunctive constructions.

Language	Example	Notes
Macedonian	Да (си) одиш!	"Оди" [odi] in the imperative is more common, and has the identical meaning.
Bulgarian	Да си ходиш!	"Ходи си!" [ho'di si] is the more common imperative.
Torlak	Да идеш!	"Иди!" in the imperative is grammatically correct, and has the identical meaning.
Albanian	Të shkosh!	"Shko!" in the imperative is grammatically correct. "Të shkosh" is used in sentence only followed by a modal verbs, ex. in these cases: Ti duhet të shkosh (You should go), Ti mund të shkosh (You can go) etc.
Modern Greek	Να πας!	
Romany	Te dža!	
Romanian	Să te duci!	compare with similar Spanish "¡Que te largues!"; in Romanian, the "a se duce" (to go) requires a reflexive construction, literally "take yourself (to)"
Meglenian	S-ti duts!	compare with similar Spanish "¡Que te largues!"; in Romanian, the "a se duce" (to go) requires a reflexive construction, literally "take yourself (to)"
Aromanian	S-ti duts!	compare with similar Spanish "¡Que te largues!"; in Romanian, the "a se duce" (to go) requires a reflexive construction, literally "take yourself (to)"

==== Morphology ====
===== Postposed article =====
With the exception of Greek, Serbo-Croatian, and Romani, all languages in the union have their definite article attached to the end of the noun, instead of before it. None of the related languages (like other Romance languages or Slavic languages) share this feature, with the notable exception of the northern Russian dialects, and it is thought to be an innovation created and spread in the Balkans. It is possible that postposed article in Balkan Slavic is the result of influence from Eastern Romance languages (Romanian or Aromanian) during the Middle Ages. However, each language created its own internal articles, so the Romanian articles are related to the articles (and demonstrative pronouns) in Italian, French, etc., whereas the Bulgarian articles are related to demonstrative pronouns in other Slavic languages.

Romanian does also possess forms of preposed definite article, "cel/cea" in nominative and "a/al" in genitive. These are mandatory in situations where a numeral is interposed before the noun, or before adjectives (e.g. "al doilea", "cel nou"; "cei doi producători"; compare to Spanish "el segundo"; "el nuevo"; "los dos productores", respectively).

Language	Feminine		Masculine	
Language	without article	with article	without article	with article
English	woman	the woman	man	the man
Albanian	grua	gruaja	burrë	burri
Aromanian	muljari	muljarea	bãrbat	bãrbatlu
Bulgarian	жена	жената	мъж	мъжът
Greek	γυναίκα	η γυναίκα	άντρας	ο άντρας
Macedonian	жена	жената	маж	мажот
Romanian	femeie muiere	femeia muierea	bărbat	bărbatul
Torlak	жена	жената	муж	мужът

===== Numeral formation =====
The Slavic way of composing the numbers between 10 and 20, e.g. "one + on + ten" for eleven, called superessive, is widespread. Greek does not follow this.

Language	The word "Eleven"	compounds
Albanian	"njëmbëdhjetë"	një + mbë + dhjetë
Aromanian	"unsprãdzatsi", commonly, "unsprã"	un + sprã + dzatsi
Bulgarian	"единадесет" (единайсет also allowed)	един + (н)а(д) + десет
Macedonian	"единаесет"	еде(и)н + (н)а(д) + (д)есет
Romanian	"unsprezece" or, more commonly, "unșpe"	un + spre + zece < *unu + supre + dece; unu + spre; the latter is more commonly used, even in formal speech.
Serbo-Croatian	"jedanaest/једанаест"	jedan+ (n)a+ (d)es(e)t/један + (н)а + (д)ес(е)т. This is not the case only with South Slavic languages (Slovene - "enajst"). This word is formed in the same way in all Slavic languages: Polish – "jedenaście", Czech – "jedenáct", Slovak – "jedenásť", Russian – "одиннадцать", Ukrainian – "одинадцять", Belarusian – "адзінаццаць", Lower Sorbian – "jadnasćo", Upper Sorbian – "jědnaće".

Albanian has preserved the vigesimal system, which is considered to be an remnant from a Pre-Indo-European language. The number 20 is described njëzet and 40 as dyzet. In some dialects trezet '60' and katërzet '80' still may be used. However, these may also be later innovations, specifically among the Arbëreshë where they're found, as none of the old authors are found to have used anything beyond dyzet (forty), with Buzuku, the oldest known, using it exclusively in njëzet (twenty). All other Balkan languages lack at this.

===== Clitic pronouns =====
Direct and indirect objects are cross-referenced, or doubled, in the verb phrase by a clitic (weak) pronoun, agreeing with the object in gender, number, and case or case function. This can be found in Romanian, Greek, Bulgarian, Macedonian, and Albanian. In Albanian and Macedonian, this feature shows fully grammaticalized structures and is obligatory with indirect objects and to some extent with definite direct objects; in Bulgarian, however, it is optional and therefore based on discourse. In Greek, the construction contrasts with the clitic-less construction and marks the cross-referenced object as a topic. Southwest Macedonia appears to be the location of innovation.

For example, "I see George" in Balkan languages:

Language	Example
Albanian	"E shoh Gjergjin"
Aromanian	"U- ved Yioryi"
Bulgarian	"Гледам го Георги."
Macedonian	"Гo гледам Ѓорѓи."
Greek	"Τον βλέπω τον Γιώργο"
Romanian	"Îl văd pe Gheorghe."

Note: In Bulgarian, the neutral case in normal (SVO) word order is without a clitic: "Гледам Георги." However, the form with an additional clitic pronoun is also perfectly normal and can be used for emphasis: "Гледам го Георги." And the clitic is obligatory in the case of a topicalized object (with OVS-word order), which serves also as the common colloquial equivalent of a passive construction. "Георги го гледам." In Romania, the form without an additional clitic pronoun is also correct: "Văd pe Gheorghe".

===== Adjectives =====
The replacement of synthetic adjectival comparative forms with analytic ones by means of preposed markers is common. These markers are:

- Bulgarian: по-
- Macedonian: по (prepended)
- Albanian: më
- Romanian: mai
- Modern Greek: πιο (pió)
- Aromanian: (ca)ma

This feature is common with the other Romance languages, where similar markers are used to form the comparative and superlative:

- Spanish "más"
- Italian "piu"
- French "plus"
- Portuguese "mais"
- Romanian "mai"

Macedonian and Modern Greek have retained some of the earlier synthetic forms. In Bulgarian and Macedonian these have become proper adjectives in their own right without the possibility of [further] comparison. This is more evident in Macedonian: виш = "higher, superior", ниж = "lower, inferior". Compare with similar structures in Bulgarian: висш(-(ия(т))/а(та)/о(то)/и(те)) = "(the) higher, (the) superior" (по-висш(-(ия(т))/а(та)/о(то)/и(те)) = "(the) [more] higher, (the) [more] superior"; 'най-висш(-(ия(т))/о(то)/а(та)/и(те))' = "(the) ([most]) highest, supreme"; нисш (also spelled as низш sometimes) = "low, lower, inferior", it can also possess further comparative or superlative as with 'висш' above.

Another common trait of these languages is the lack of suppletive comparative degrees for the adjective "good" and "bad", unlike other Indo-European languages.

===== Suffixes =====
Also, some common suffixes can be found in the language area, such as the diminutive suffix of the Slavic languages (Srb. Bul. Mac.) "-ovo" "-ica" that can be found in Albanian, Greek ("-iță" is also found in Romanian").

=== Vocabulary ===
==== Loanwords ====
Several hundred words are common to the Balkan union languages; the origin of most of them is either Greek, Bulgarian or Turkish, as the Byzantine Empire, the First Bulgarian Empire, the Second Bulgarian Empire and later the Ottoman Empire directly controlled the territory throughout most of its history, strongly influencing its culture and economics.

Albanian, Aromanian, Bulgarian, Greek, Romanian, Serbo-Croatian and Macedonian also share a large number of words of various origins:

Source	Source word	Meaning	Albanian	Aromanian	Bulgarian	Greek	Romanian	Macedonian	Serbian	Turkish
Vulgar Latin	mēsa	table	mësallë ‘dinner table; tablecloth’	measã	маса (masa)	—	masă	маса (masa)	—	masa
Thracian	romphea, rumpīa	polearm	colloq. rrufe ‘lightning bolt’	rofélja	dial. руфия (rufiya) ‘thunderbolt’	anc. ρομφαία (rhomphaía)	—	colloq. ровја (rovja) and dial. рофја (rofja) ‘thunder’	—	—
Ancient Greek	κρόμμυον (krómmyon)	onion	—	—	dial. кромид лук (kromid luk)	κρεμμύδι (kremmýdhi)	—	кромид (kromid)	—	—
Byzantine Greek	λιβάδιον (livádion)	meadow	colloq. livadh	livadhi	ливада (livada)	λιβάδι (livádhi)	livadă	ливада (livada)	livada ливада (livada)	—
Byzantine Greek	διδάσκαλος (didáskalos)	teacher	obs. dhaskal/icë	dascal	colloq. даскал (daskal)	δάσκαλος (dháskalos)	rare dascăl	colloq. даскал (daskal)	colloq. даскал (daskal)	—
Byzantine Greek	κουτίον (koutíon)	box	kuti	cutii	кутия (kutiya)	κουτί (koutí)	cutie	кутија (kutija)	kutija кутија (kutija)	kutu
Slavic	*vydra	otter	vidër	vidrã	видра (vidra)	βίδρα (vídra)	vidră	видра (vidra)	видра (vidra)	—
Slavic	*kosa	scythe	kosë	coasã	коса (kosa)	κόσα (kósa)	coasă	коса (kosa)	коса (kosa)	—
Turkish	boya	paint, color	colloq. bojë	boi	боя (boya)	μπογιά (boyá)	boia	боја (boja)	boja боја (boja)	boya

==== Calques ====
Apart from the direct loans, there are also many calques that were passed from one Balkan language to another, most of them between Albanian, Macedonian, Bulgarian, Greek, Aromanian and Romanian.

For example, the word "ripen" (as in fruit) is constructed in Albanian, Romanian and (rarely) in Greek (piqem, a (se) coace, ψήνομαι), in Turkish pişmek by a derivation from the word "to bake" (pjek, a coace, ψήνω).

Another example is the wish "(∅/to/for) many years":

Language		Expression	Transliteration
Greek	(medieval)	εις έτη πολλά	is eti polla; (See the note below.)
Greek	(modern)	χρόνια πολλά	khronia polla
Latin		ad multos annos	
Aromanian		ti mullts anj	
Romanian		la mulți ani	
Albanian		për shumë vjet	
Bulgarian		за много години	za mnogo godini
Macedonian		за многу години	za mnogu godini
Serbian		за много годинa	za mnogo godina

Note: In Old Church Slavonic and archaic Eastern South Slavic dialects, the term сполай(j) ти (spolaj ti) was commonly used in meaning thank you, derived from the Byzantine Greek εἰς πολλὰ ἔτη (is polla eti).

Idiomatic expressions for "whether one <verb> or not" are formed as "<verb>-not-<verb>". "Whether one wants or not":

Language	expression	transliteration
Bulgarian	ще - не ще	shte - ne shte
Greek	θέλει δε θέλει	theli de theli
Romanian	vrea nu vrea	
Turkish	ister istemez	
Serbian	хтео – не хтео	hteo – ne hteo
Albanian	do – s'do	
Macedonian	сакал – не сакал / нејќел	sakal – ne sakal / nejkjel
Aromanian	vrea – nu vrea	

This is also present in other Slavic languages, e.g. Polish chcąc nie chcąc.

=== Phonetics ===
The proposed phonological features consist of:

- the presence of an unrounded central vowel, either a mid-central schwa /ə/ or a high central vowel phoneme
  - ë in Albanian; ъ in Bulgarian; ă in Romanian; ã in Aromanian
  - In Romanian and Albanian, the schwa is developed from an unstressed /a/
    - Example: Latin camisia "shirt" > Romanian cămașă /kə.ma.ʃə/, Albanian këmishë /kə.mi.ʃə/)
  - The schwa phoneme occurs across some dialects of the Macedonian language, but is absent in the standard.
- some kind of umlaut in stressed syllables with differing patterns depending on the language.
  - Romanian:
    - a mid-back vowel ends in a low glide before a nonhigh vowel in the following syllable.
    - a central vowel is fronted before a front vowel in the following syllable.
  - Albanian: back vowels are fronted before i in the following syllable.
- The presence of /v/ or /ʋ/ but not /w/

The first feature also occurs in Greek, but it is lacking in some of the other Balkan languages; the central vowel is found in Romanian, Bulgarian, some dialects of Albanian, and Serbo-Croatian, but not in Greek or Standard Macedonian.

Less widespread features are confined largely to either Romanian or Albanian, or both:

- frequent loss of l before i in Romanian and some Romani dialects
- the alternation between n and r in Albanian and Romanian.
- change from l to r in Romanian, Greek and very rarely in Bulgarian and Albanian.
- the raising of o to u in unstressed syllables in Bulgarian, Romanian and Northern Greek dialects.
- change from ea to e before i in Bulgarian and Romanian.

Not all linguists agree there are any phonological features associated with Balkan sprachbund.

== See also ==
- Albanian grammar
- Albanian–Romanian linguistic relationship
- Balkan languages
- Bulgarian grammar
- Greek grammar
- Macedonian grammar
- More, re and bre – Interjections in foreign languages
- Paleo-Balkan languages
- Serbo-Croatian grammar
- Turkish grammar
