= South Slavic languages =

Language family

South Slavic
- Geographic distribution: Southeast Europe
- Linguistic classification: Indo-European: Balto-Slavic; Slavic; South Slavic
- Subdivisions: Eastern South Slavic; Western South Slavic

Language codes
- ISO 639-5: zls
- Glottolog: sout3147
- Countries where a South Slavic language is official

The South Slavic languages are one of the three branches of the Slavic languages. They have approximately 30 million speakers, chiefly in the Balkans. They are commonly divided into eastern and western subgroups, with Bulgarian and Macedonian in the former, and Serbo-Croatian and Slovene in the latter. South Slavic languages are separated geographically from speakers of the other two Slavic branches (West and East) by a belt of Austrian German, Hungarian and Romanian speakers, none of which are Slavic.

== History ==
The first South Slavic language to be written (also the first attested Slavic language) was the variety of the Eastern South Slavic spoken in Thessaloniki, now called Old Church Slavonic, in the ninth century. It is retained as a liturgical language in Slavic Orthodox churches in the form of various local Church Slavonic traditions.

== Classification ==
- South Slavic
  - Eastern South Slavic
    - Bulgarian
    - Macedonian
    - Old Church Slavonic
  - Western South Slavic
    - Slovene
    - Serbo-Croatian
      - Serbian
      - Croatian
      - Bosnian
      - Montenegrin

=== Linguistic prehistory ===
The Slavic languages are part of the Balto-Slavic group, which belongs to the Indo-European language family. The South Slavic languages have been considered a genetic node in Slavic studies: defined by a set of phonological, morphological and lexical innovations (isoglosses) which separate it from the Western and Eastern Slavic groups. That view, however, has been challenged in recent decades (see below).

Some innovations encompassing all South Slavic languages are shared with the Eastern Slavic group, but not the Western Slavic. These include:

1. Consistent application of Slavic second palatalization before Proto-Slavic *v
2. Loss of *d and *t before Proto-Slavic *l
3. Merger of Proto-Slavic *ś (resulting from the second and third palatalization) with *s

This is illustrated in the following table:

Late Proto-Slavic		South Slavic					West Slavic			East Slavic		
reconstruction	meaning	Old Church Slavonic	Slovene	Serbo-Croatian	Bulgarian	Macedonian	Czech	Slovak	Polish	Belarusian	Russian	Ukrainian
*gvězda	star	звѣзда	zvezda	zv(ij)ézda зв(иј)е́зда	звезда	ѕвезда	hvězda	hviezda	gwiazda	зорка, звязда	звезда (звѣзда)	зірка
*květъ	flower, bloom	цвѣтъ	cvet	cv(ij)ȇt цв(иј)е̑т	цвете	цвет	květ	kvet	kwiat	кветка, цвет	цветок, цвет	цвіт, квітка
*ordlo	plough	рало	ralo	rȁlo ра̏ло	рало	рало	rádlo	radlo	radło	арала	орало, рало	орало, рало
*vьśь	all	вьсь	ves	sȁv са̏в	вси	сиот	vše	všetok	wszystkie	усе, увесь	все, весь	всі, весь

Several isoglosses have been identified which are thought to represent exclusive common innovations in the South Slavic language group. They are prevalently phonological in character, whereas morphological and syntactical isoglosses are much fewer in number. Sussex & Cubberly (2006:43–44) list the following phonological isoglosses:

1. Merger of yers into schwa-like sound, which became /a/ in Serbo-Croatian, or split according to the retained hard/soft quality of the preceding consonant into /o e/ (Macedonian), or /ə e/ (Bulgarian)
2. Proto-Slavic *ę > /e/
3. Proto-Slavic *y > /i/, merging with the reflex of Proto-Slavic *i
4. Proto-Slavic syllabic liquids *r̥ and *l̥ were retained, but *l̥ was subsequently lost in all the daughter languages with different outputs (> /u/ in Serbo-Croatian, > vowel+/l/ or /l/+vowel in Slovene, Bulgarian and Macedonian), and *r̥ became [ər/rə] in Bulgarian. This development was identical to the loss of yer after a liquid consonant.
5. Hardening of palatals and dental affricates; e.g. š' > š, č' > č, c' > c.
6. South Slavic form of liquid metathesis (CoRC > CRaC, CoLC > CLaC etc.)

Most of these are not exclusive in character, however, and are shared with some languages of the Eastern and Western Slavic language groups (in particular, Central Slovak dialects). On that basis, Matasović (2008) argues that South Slavic exists strictly as a geographical grouping, not forming a true genetic clade; in other words, there was never a proto-South Slavic language or a period in which all South Slavic dialects exhibited an exclusive set of extensive phonological, morphological or lexical changes (isoglosses) peculiar to them. Furthermore, Matasović argues, there was never a period of cultural or political unity in which Proto-South-Slavic could have existed during which Common South Slavic innovations could have occurred. Several South-Slavic-only lexical and morphological patterns which have been proposed have been postulated to represent common Slavic archaisms, or are shared with some Slovak or Ukrainian dialects.

The South Slavic dialects form a dialectal continuum stretching from today's southern Austria to southeast Bulgaria. On the level of dialectology, they are divided into Western South Slavic (Slovene and Serbo-Croatian dialects) and Eastern South Slavic (Bulgarian and Macedonian dialects); these represent separate migrations into the Balkans and were once separated by intervening Hungarian, Romanian, and Albanian populations; as these populations were assimilated, Eastern and Western South Slavic fused with Torlak as a transitional dialect. On the other hand, the breakup of the Ottoman and Austro-Hungarian Empires, followed by formation of nation-states in the 19th and 20th centuries, led to the development and codification of standard languages. Standard Slovene, Bulgarian, and Macedonian are based on distinct dialects. The Bosnian, Croatian, Montenegrin, and Serbian standard variants of the pluricentric Serbo-Croatian are based on the same dialect (Shtokavian). Thus, in most cases national and ethnic borders do not coincide with dialectal boundaries.

Note: Due to the differing political status of languages/dialects and different historical contexts, the classifications are arbitrary to some degree.

=== Dialectal classification ===
South Slavic dialect continuum with major dialect groups

The South Slavic languages constitute a dialect continuum.

- South Slavic
  - Eastern South Slavic
    - Bulgarian dialects
      - Eastern Bulgarian dialects
      - Western Bulgarian dialects
    - Macedonian dialects
      - Northern Macedonian dialects
      - Western Macedonian dialects
      - Southeastern Macedonian dialects
  - Transitional South Slavic (Torlak)
    - Transitional Bulgarian dialects in western Bulgaria
    - Gora dialect in southern Kosovo, western North Macedonia and northeast Albania
    - Prizren-Timok dialect in southeast Serbia and eastern Kosovo
    - Karashevian dialect in western Romania
  - Western South Slavic
    - Shtokavian dialects
      - Šumadija–Vojvodina dialect (Ekavian, Neo-Shtokavian): Serbia
      - Smederevo–Vršac dialect (Ekavian, Old-Shtokavian): east-central Serbia
      - Kosovo–Resava dialect (Ekavian, Old-Shtokavian): north Kosovo, eastern central Serbia
      - Zeta-Raška dialect (Ijekavian, Old-Shtokavian), in south and east Montenegro and southwest Serbia
      - Eastern Herzegovinian dialect (Ijekavian, Neo-Shtokavian), Croatia, Bosnia, Serbia, Montenegro
      - Eastern Bosnian dialect (Ijekavian, Old-Shtokavian), in central and northern Bosnia
      - Slavonian dialect (mixed yat, Old-Shtokavian), in eastern Croatia
      - Younger Ikavian dialect (Ikavian) with 3 subdialects — Dalmatian, Danubian (Bunjevac speech), and Littoral-Lika: in Dalmatia, central Bosnia, northern Serbia, southern Hungary (incl. Budapest)
      - Prizren-Timok dialect (Ekavian, Old-Shtokavian), in southeast Serbia and south Kosovo
    - Chakavian dialects
      - Buzet dialect: Croatia
      - Northern Chakavian dialect: Croatia
      - Central Chakavian dialect
      - Southern Chakavian dialect: Croatia
      - Southeastern Chakavian dialect
      - Southwestern Istrian dialect: Croatia
      - Lastovo dialect: Croatia
    - Kajkavian dialects, in Croatia
      - Zagorje–Međimurje dialect
      - Križevci–Podravina dialect
      - Turopolje–Posavina dialect
      - Prigorje dialect
      - Lower Sutla dialect
      - Gora dialect
    - Slovene dialects
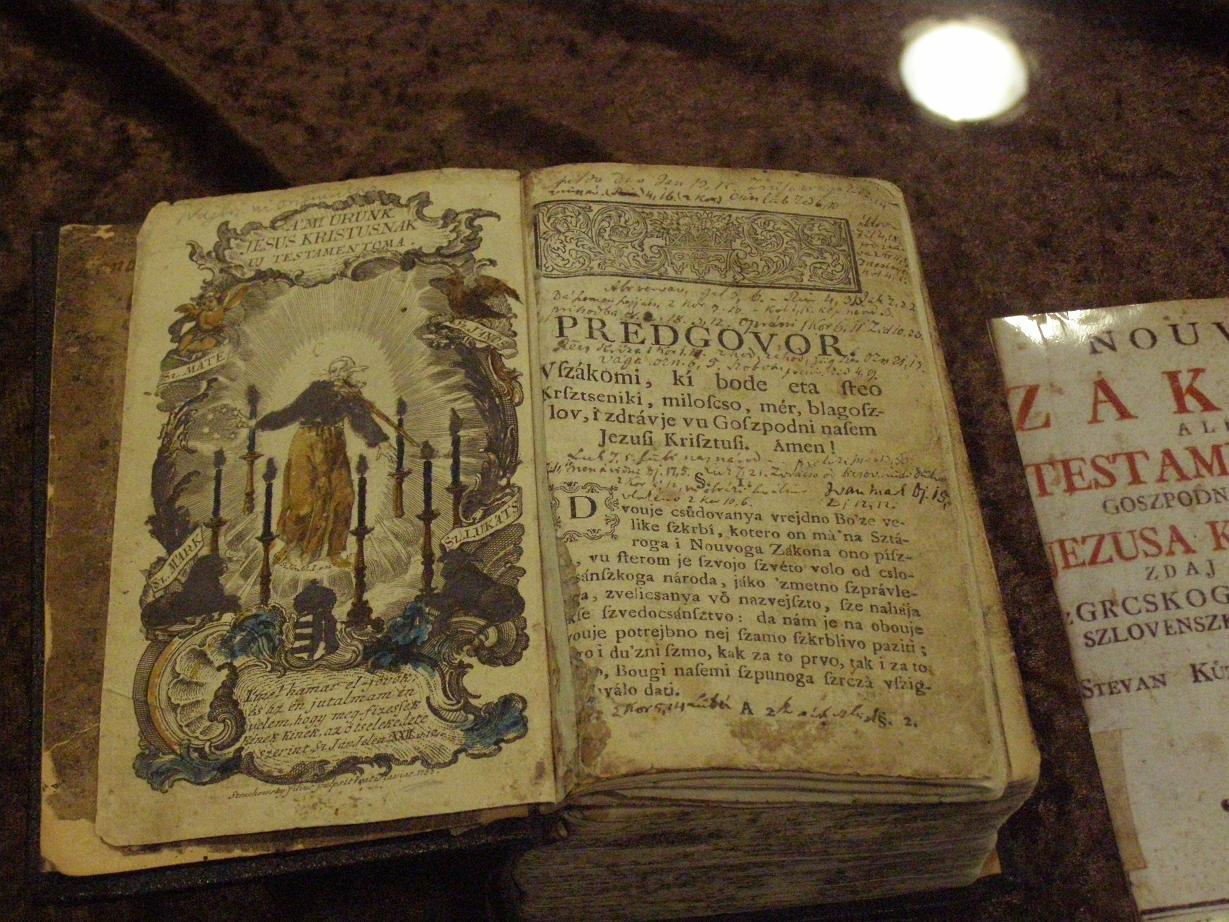
      Prekmurje Slovene Lutheran New Testament, the Nouvi Zákon (1770s)
      - Littoral Slovene dialect: Primorsko; west Slovenia and Adriatic
      - Rovte Slovene dialect: Rovtarsko; between Littoral and Carniolan
      - Upper and Lower Carniolan dialect: Gorenjsko and Dolenjsko; central; basis of Standard Slovene
      - Styrian dialect: Štajersko; eastern Slovenia
      - Pannonian or Prekmurje Slovene dialect: Panonsko; far eastern Slovenia
      - Carinthian dialect: Koroško; far north and northwest Slovenia
      - Resian dialect: Rozajansko; Italy, west of Carinthian
    - Other
      - Burgenland Croatian (mixed), minority in Austria and Hungary

== Eastern South Slavic languages ==
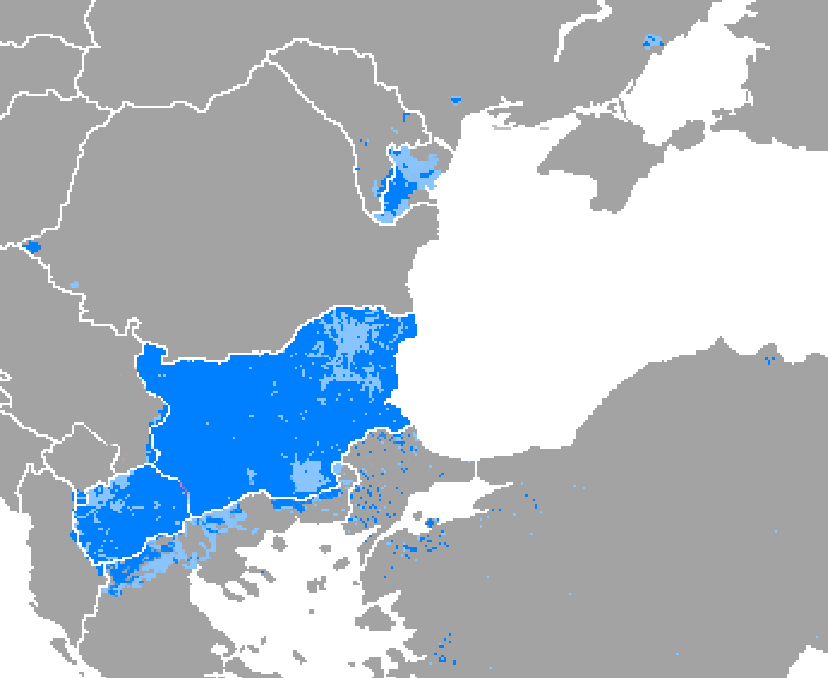
Areas where Eastern South Slavic dialects are spoken: by a majority of speakers by a minority.

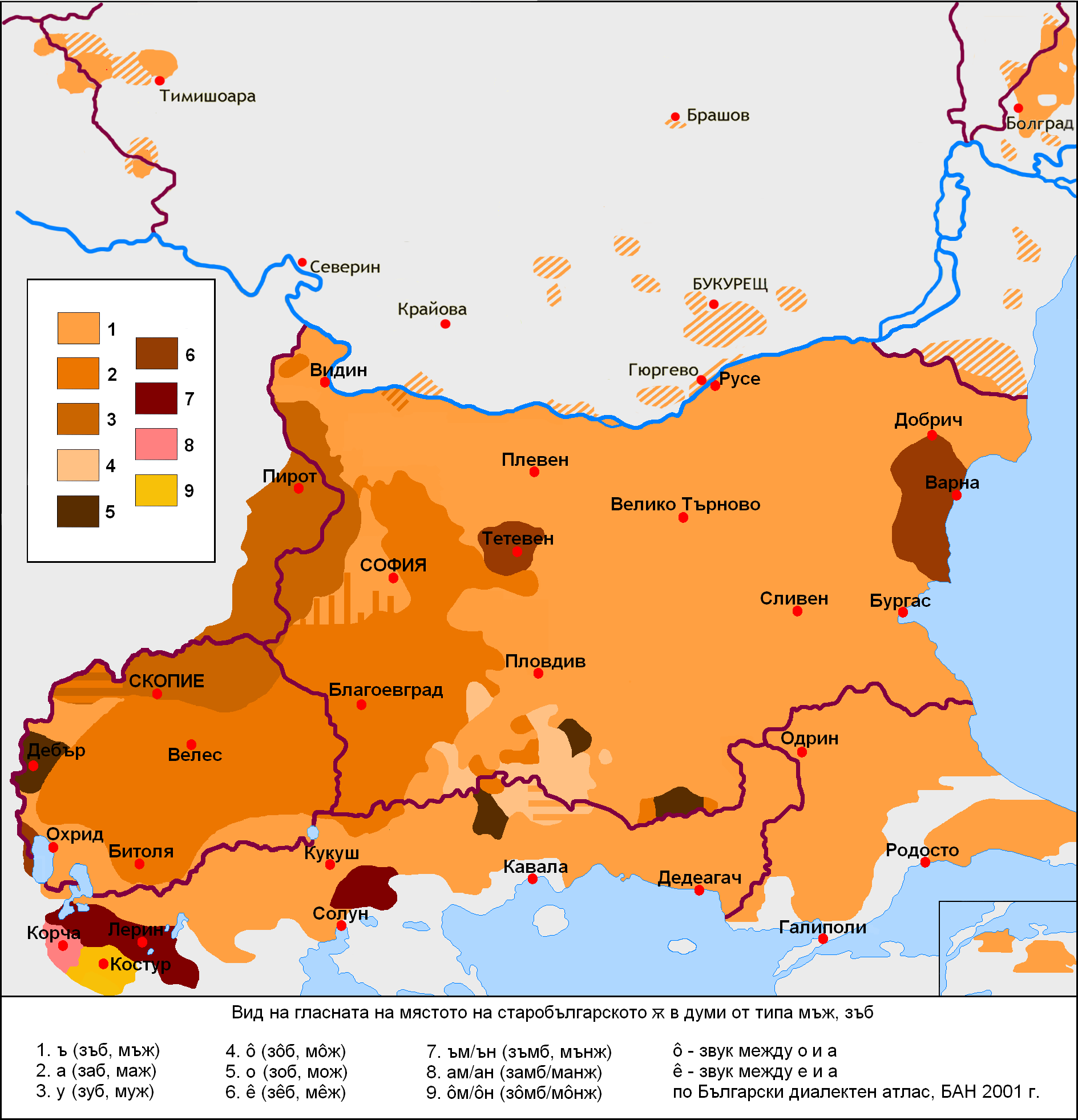
Map of the big yus (*ǫ) isoglosses in Eastern South Slavic and the eastern part of the transitional Torlak dialects according to the Bulgarian Academy of Sciences' atlas from 2001. Pronunciation of man and tooth, derived from proto-words zǫbъ mǫžь on the map: 1. [mɤʃ], [zɤp] (see зъб and ząb); 2. [maʃ], [zap] (see заб); 3. [muʃ], [zup] (see зуб and zub); 4. /mɒʃ/, /zɒp/; 5. [mɔʃ], [zɔp] (see zob, mąż); 6. /mæʃ/, /zæp/ (see mężczyzna); 7. [mɤmʃ], [zɤmp]; 8. [mamʃ], [zamp]; 9. /mɒmʃ/, /zɒmp/ (see ząb)

The dialects that form the eastern group of South Slavic, spoken mostly in Bulgaria and Macedonia and adjacent areas in neighbouring countries (such as the Bessarabian Bulgarians in Ukraine), share a number of characteristics that set them apart from other Slavic languages:

- the existence of a definite article (e.g. книга, book – книгата, the book, време, time – времето, the time)
- a near-complete lack of noun cases
- the lack of a verb infinitive
- the formation of comparative forms of adjectives formed with the prefix по- (e.g. добър, по-добър (Bulg.)/добар, подобар (Maced.) – good, better)
- a future tense formed by the present form of the verb preceded by ще/ќе
- the existence of a renarrative mood (e.g. Той ме видял. (Bulg.)/Тој ме видел. (Maced.) – He supposedly saw me. Compare with Той ме видя./Тој ме виде. – He saw me.)

Bulgarian and Macedonian share some of their unusual characteristics with other languages in the Balkans, notably Greek and Albanian (see Balkan sprachbund).

=== Bulgarian dialects ===
- Eastern Bulgarian dialects
- Western Bulgarian dialects

=== Macedonian dialects ===
- Southeastern Macedonian dialects
- Northern Macedonian dialects
- Western Macedonian dialects

== Transitional South Slavic dialects ==
=== Torlak dialects ===
Torlak dialects are spoken in southeastern Serbia, northern North Macedonia, western Bulgaria, southeastern Kosovo, and pockets of western Romania; it is considered transitional between the Western and Eastern groups of South Slavic languages. Torlak is thought to fit together with Bulgarian and Macedonian into the Balkan sprachbund, an area of linguistic convergence caused by long-term contact rather than genetic relation. Because of this some researchers tend to classify it as Southeast Slavic.

== Western South Slavic languages ==
=== History ===
Each of these primary and secondary dialectal units breaks down into subdialects and accentological isoglosses by region. In the past (and currently, in isolated areas), it was not uncommon for individual villages to have their own words and phrases. However, during the 20th century the local dialects have been influenced by Štokavian standards through mass media and public education and much "local speech" has been lost (primarily in areas with larger populations). With the breakup of Yugoslavia, a rise in national awareness has caused individuals to modify their speech according to newly established standard-language guidelines. The wars have caused large migrations, changing the ethnic (and dialectal) picture of some areas—especially in Bosnia and Herzegovina, but also in central Croatia and Serbia (Vojvodina in particular). In some areas, it is unclear whether location or ethnicity is the dominant factor in the dialect of the speaker. Because of this the speech patterns of some communities and regions are in a state of flux, and it is difficult to determine which dialects will die out entirely. Further research over the next few decades will be necessary to determine the changes made in the dialectical distribution of this language group.

=== Shtokavian dialects ===
The eastern Herzegovinian dialect is the basis of the Bosnian, Croatian, Montenegrin, and Serbian standard variants of the pluricentric Serbo-Croatian.

=== Chakavian dialects ===
Chakavian is spoken in the western, central, and southern parts of Croatia—mainly in Istria, the Kvarner Gulf, Dalmatia and inland Croatia (Gacka and Pokupje, for example). The Chakavian reflex of proto-Slavic yat is i or sometimes e (rarely as (i)je), or mixed (Ekavian–Ikavian). Many dialects of Chakavian preserved significant number of Dalmatian words, but also have many loanwords from Venetian, Italian, Greek and other Mediterranean languages.

Example: Ča je, je, tako je vavik bilo, ča će bit, će bit, a nekako će već bit!

==== Burgenland Croatian ====
This dialect is spoken primarily in the federal state of Burgenland in Austria and nearby areas in Vienna, Slovakia, and Hungary by descendants of Croats who migrated there during the 16th century. This dialect (or family of dialects) differs from standard Croatian, since it has been heavily influenced by German and Hungarian. It has properties of all three major dialectal groups in Croatia, since the migrants did not all come from the same area, but the linguistic standard is based on the Chakavian dialect.

=== Kajkavian dialects ===
Kajkavian is mostly spoken in northern and northwest Croatia near the Hungarian and Slovene borders—chiefly around the towns of Zagreb, Varaždin, Čakovec, Koprivnica, Petrinja, Delnice and so on. Its reflex of yat is primarily /e/, rarely diphthongal ije). This differs from that of the Ekavian accent; many Kajkavian dialects distinguish a closed e—nearly ae (from yat)—and an open e (from the original e). It lacks several palatals (ć, lj, nj, dž) found in the Shtokavian dialect, and has some loanwords from the nearby Slovene dialects and German (chiefly in towns).

Example: Kak je, tak je; tak je navek bilo, kak bu tak bu, a bu vre nekak kak bu!

=== Slovene dialects ===
Slovene is mainly spoken in Slovenia. Spoken Slovene has numerous dialects, but there is no consensus on how many; estimates range from 7 to 50. The lowest estimate refers to the language's seven commonly recognized dialect groups, without subdividing any of them. Some of the seven groups are more heterogeneous than others, and the higher estimates reflect the varying criteria that have been used to differentiate dialects and subdialects. Slovenian dialects can be so different from each other that a speaker of one dialect may have a very difficult time understanding a speaker of another, particularly if their dialects belong to different groups. Some dialects spoken in southern Slovenia transition into Chakavian or Kajkavian Serbo-Croatian, while the transition from eastern dialects to Kajkavian is general, with cases of essentially the same linguistic variety spoken on both sides of the border (this is particularly true for the upper course of the Kupa and Sutla rivers).

=== Comparison ===
The table below compares grammatical and phonological innovations. The similarity of Kajkavian and Slovene is apparent.

Western South Slavic isoglosses
	Slovene	Kajkavian	Chakavian	Shtokavian
Acute > neoacute nonfinally	Most dialects	No	No	No
Loss of Proto-Slavic tone	Some dialects	No	No	Neoshtokavian
u- > vu-	Some dialects	Yes	No	No
ǫ > o	Yes	Yes	No	No
-ojo > -o in instrumental singular	Yes	Yes	No	No
ć > č	Most dialects	Yes	No	No
Neocircumflex	Yes	Yes	No	No
Loss of vocative	Yes	Yes	Some dialects	No
Final devoicing	Most dialects	Yes	Yes	No
đ > j	Yes	Yes	Yes	No
žV > rV	Yes	Yes	Yes	Western
Final -m > -n	Some dialects	No	Yes	No
ľ, ň > l, n	Most dialects	No	Yes	No
jd, jt > đ, ć	No	No	Yes	Yes
ř > r	No	No	Yes	Yes
ə > a	No	No	Yes	Yes
čr > cr	No	No	No	Yes
Dat/loc/ins plural -ma/-u (from dual)	No	No	No	Yes

== Grammar ==
=== Eastern–Western division ===
In broad terms, the Eastern dialects of South Slavic (Bulgarian and Macedonian) differ most from the Western dialects in the following ways:

- The Eastern dialects have almost completely lost their noun declensions, and have become entirely analytic.
- The Eastern dialects have developed definite-article suffixes similar to the other languages in the Balkan sprachbund.
- The Eastern dialects have lost the infinitive; thus, the first-person singular (for Bulgarian) or the third-person singular (for Macedonian) are considered the main part of a verb. Sentences which would require an infinitive in other languages are constructed through a clause in Bulgarian, искам да ходя (iskam da hodya), "I want to go" (literally, "I want that I go").

Apart from these three main areas there are several smaller, significant differences:

- The Western dialects have three genders in both singular and plural (Slovene has dual—see below), while the Eastern dialects only have them in the singular—for example, Serbian on (he), ona (she), ono (it), oni (they, masc), one (they, fem), ona (they, neut); the Bulgarian te (they) and Macedonian тие (tie, 'they') covers the entire plural.
- Inheriting a generalization of another demonstrative as a base form for the third-person pronoun which already occurred in late Proto-Slavic, standard literary Bulgarian (like Old Church Slavonic) does not use the Slavic "on-/ov-" as base forms like on, ona, ono, oni (he, she, it, they), and ovaj, ovde (this, here), but uses "to-/t-"based pronouns like toy, tya, to, te, and tozi, tuk (it only retains onzi – "that" and its derivatives). Western Bulgarian dialects and Macedonian have "ov-/on-" pronouns, and sometimes use them interchangeably.
- All dialects of Serbo-Croatian contain the concept of "any" – e.g. Serbian neko "someone"; niko "no one"; iko "anyone". All others lack the last, and make do with some- or no- constructions instead.

=== Divisions within Western dialects ===
- While Serbian, Bosnian and Croatian Shtokavian dialects have basically the same grammar, its usage is very diverse. While all three languages are relatively highly inflected, the further east one goes the more likely it is that analytic forms are used – if not spoken, at least in the written language. A very basic example is:
  - Croatian – hoću ići – "I want – to go"
  - Serbian – hoću da idem – "I want – that – I go"
- Slovene has retained the proto-Slavic dual number (which means that it has nine personal pronouns in the third person) for both nouns and verbs. For example:
  - nouns: volk (wolf) → volkova (two wolves) → volkovi (some wolves)
  - verbs: hodim (I walk) → hodiva (the two of us walk) → hodimo (we walk)

=== Divisions within Eastern dialects ===
- In Macedonian, the perfect is largely based on the verb "to have" (as in other Balkan languages like Greek and Albanian, and in English), as opposed to the verb "to be", which is used as the auxiliary in all other Slavic languages (see also Macedonian verbs):
  - Macedonian – imam videno – I have seen (imam – "to have")
  - Bulgarian – vidyal sum – I have seen (sum – "to be")
- In Macedonian, there are three types of definite article (base definite form, definite noun near the speaker and definite noun far from the speaker).
  - дете (dete, 'а child')
  - детето (deteto, 'the child')
  - детево (detevo, 'this child [near me]')
  - детено (deteno, 'that child [over there]')

== Writing systems ==
Languages to the west of Serbia use the Latin script, whereas those to the east and south use Cyrillic. Serbian officially uses the Cyrillic script, though commonly Latin and Cyrillic are used equally. Most newspapers are written in Cyrillic and most magazines are in Latin; books written by Serbian authors are written in Cyrillic, whereas books translated from foreign authors are usually in Latin, other than languages that already use Cyrillic, most notably Russian. On television, writing as part of a television programme is usually in Cyrillic, but advertisements are usually in Latin. The division is partly based on religion – Serbia, Montenegro, Bulgaria and Macedonia (which use Cyrillic) are Orthodox countries, whereas Croatia and Slovenia (which use Latin) are Catholic. The Bosnian language, used by the Muslim Bosniaks, also uses Latin, but in the past used Bosnian Cyrillic. The Glagolitic alphabet was also used in the Middle Ages (most notably in Bulgaria, Macedonia and Croatia), but gradually disappeared.

== See also ==
- Abstand and ausbau languages
- Comparison of Serbo-Croatian standard varieties
- Language secessionism in Serbo-Croatian
- Mutual intelligibility
- Outline of Slavic history and culture
- Pluricentric Serbo-Croatian language
- South Slavic dialect continuum
- Yat

== Sources ==
- Kordić, Snježana (2010). Jezik i nacionalizam [Language and Nationalism] (PDF). Rotulus Universitas (in Serbo-Croatian). Zagreb: Durieux. p. 430. doi:10.2139/ssrn.3467646. ISBN 978-953-188-311-5. LCCN 2011520778. OCLC 729837512. OL 15270636W. CROSBI 475567. Archived (PDF) from the original on 1 June 2012.
- Matasović, Ranko (2008), Poredbenopovijesna gramatika hrvatskoga jezika (in Serbo-Croatian), Zagreb: Matica hrvatska, ISBN 978-953-150-840-7
- Sussex, Roland; Cubberly, Paul (2006), The Slavic languages, Cambridge University Press, ISBN 978-0-511-24204-5
- Edward Stankiewicz (1986). The Slavic Languages: Unity in Diversity. Walter de Gruyter. ISBN 978-3-11-009904-1.
- Mila Dimitrova-Vulchanova (1998). Formal Approaches to South Slavic Languages. Linguistics Department, NTNU.
- Mirjana N. Dedaić; Mirjana Misković-Luković (2010). South Slavic Discourse Particles. John Benjamins Publishing. ISBN 978-90-272-5601-0.
- Mila Dimitrova-Vulchanova; Lars Hellan (15 March 1999). Topics in South Slavic Syntax and Semantics. John Benjamins Publishing Company. ISBN 978-90-272-8386-3.
- Radovan Lučić (2002). Lexical norm and national language: lexicography and language policy in South-Slavic languages after 1989. Verlag Otto Sagner. ISBN 9783876908236.
- Motoki Nomachi (2011). The Grammar of Possessivity in South Slavic Languages: Synchronic and Diachronic Perspectives. Slavic Research Center, Hokkaido University. ISBN 978-4-938637-66-8.
- Steven Franks; Brian D. Joseph; Vrinda Chidambaram (1 January 2009). A Linguist's Linguist: Studies in South Slavic Linguistics in Honor of E. Wayles Browne. Slavica Publishers. ISBN 978-0-89357-364-5.
- A. A. Barentsen; R. Sprenger; M. G. M. Tielemans (1982). South Slavic and Balkan Linguistics. Rodopi. ISBN 90-6203-634-1.
- Anita Peti-Stantić; Mateusz-Milan Stanojević; Goranka Antunović (2015). Language Varieties Between Norms and Attitudes: South Slavic Perspectives : Proceedings from the 2013 CALS Conference. Peter Lang. ISBN 978-3-631-66256-4.
