= Tetovo dialect =

Dialect of Macedonian

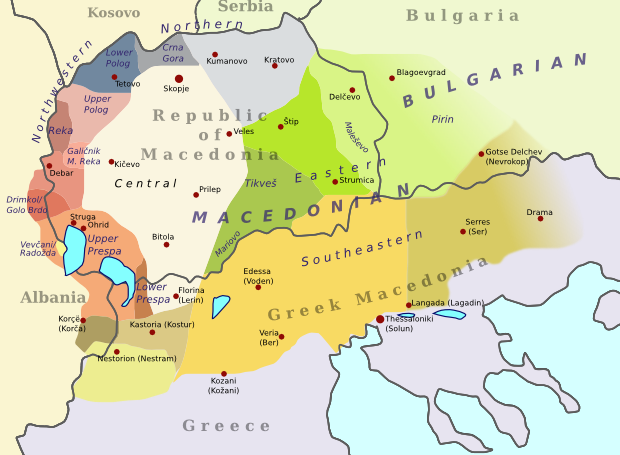
The location of the Tetovo dialect among the others Macedonian dialects

The sufferings of the beautiful princess
Excerpt from a story told by an old woman from Čelopek in the Tetovo dialect

The Tetovo dialect (Macedonian: Тетовски дијалект, Tetovski dijalekt) or Lower Polog dialect (Macedonian: Долнополошки дијалект, Dolnopološki dijalekt) is a member of the western subgroup of the northern group of dialects of Macedonian. It is considered part of the transitional Torlakian dialects. It is spoken by the population in the north-western part of North Macedonia. This dialect is spoken in the city of Tetovo, Brvenica and Jegunovce Municipality (without the villages Vratnica, Belovište, Staro Selo and Rogačevo who speak the Vratnica dialect). One of the main characteristics of this dialect is the use of the words таќе (taḱe) – "on that way" and ваќе (vaḱe) – "on this way". The Tetovo dialect can be found in several books, two of which were written by Kiril Peychinovich, namely Ogledalo and Uteshenia greshnim.

== Phonological characteristics ==
There are many characteristics that are connected with this dialect but the most significant are:

- the old vocal L is replaced by the groups u/ lu/ la: јаболко / jabolko > јабука / jabuka (apple), солза / solza > слăза / sluza (tear);
- use of A instead of E: трева / treva > трава / trava (grass), орев / orev > орав / orav (nut);
- use of ă instead of use of the yer: лаже / laže > лăже / lăže (lie);
- use of U instead of the Old Church Slavonic letter Ѫ: пат / pat > пут / put (road), внук / vnuk > унук / unuk (nephew).

== Morphological characteristics ==
- use of the suffix -mo for first person plural: одиме / odime > идемо/ idemo (we are going);
- palatal J before the letter E at the beginning of a word: јазик / jazik> језик / jezik (tongue), јаже > јуже (rope);
- the consonant group MN is replaced with the consonant group ML: многу / mnogu > млогу / mlogu (too much);
- use of the preposition U instead of the preposition VO: во град/ vo grad > у град / u grad (in city)

== Examples ==
Below is written a popular folk song from Tetovo region. The song is in Tetovo dialect.

Ogreala mesečina, lele,
Ogreala mesečina,
Od Soluna do Tetovo.

Ne mi bilo mesečina, lele,
Ne mi bilo mesečina,
Tuk’ mi bile tri neveste,
Tri neveste Tetovčanke.

Pravo odat za Tetovo, lele,
Pravo odat za Tetovo,
Kaj bakalot, čičko Jakim.

Dobro utro čičko Jakim, lele,
Dobro utro čičko Jakim.
Dal bog dobro tri neveste,
Tri neveste Tetovčanke.

Da ni dadeš dram belilo, lele,
Da ni dadeš dram belilo,
Dram belilo, dram crvilo.

Naši maži gurbetčii, lele,
Naši maži gurbetčii,
Ko’ḱe dojdat ḱeti platat.
