= Goranac =

Goranac may refer to:

- Goranac dialect
- Goranci
