= Solun-Voden dialect =

East South Slavic dialect

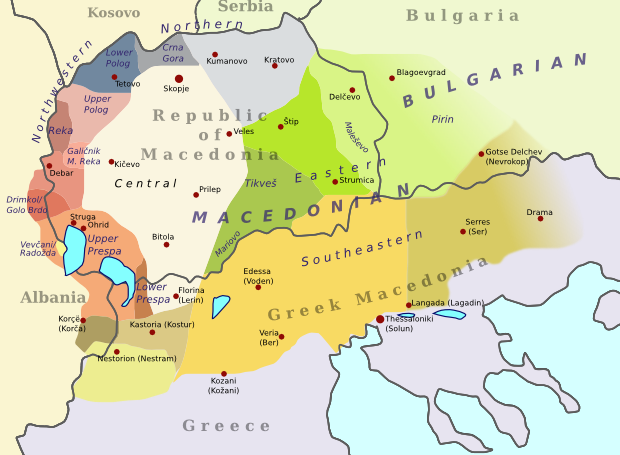
Classification of Slavic dialects in Macedonia according to the point of view, prevalent in the Republic of North Macedonia

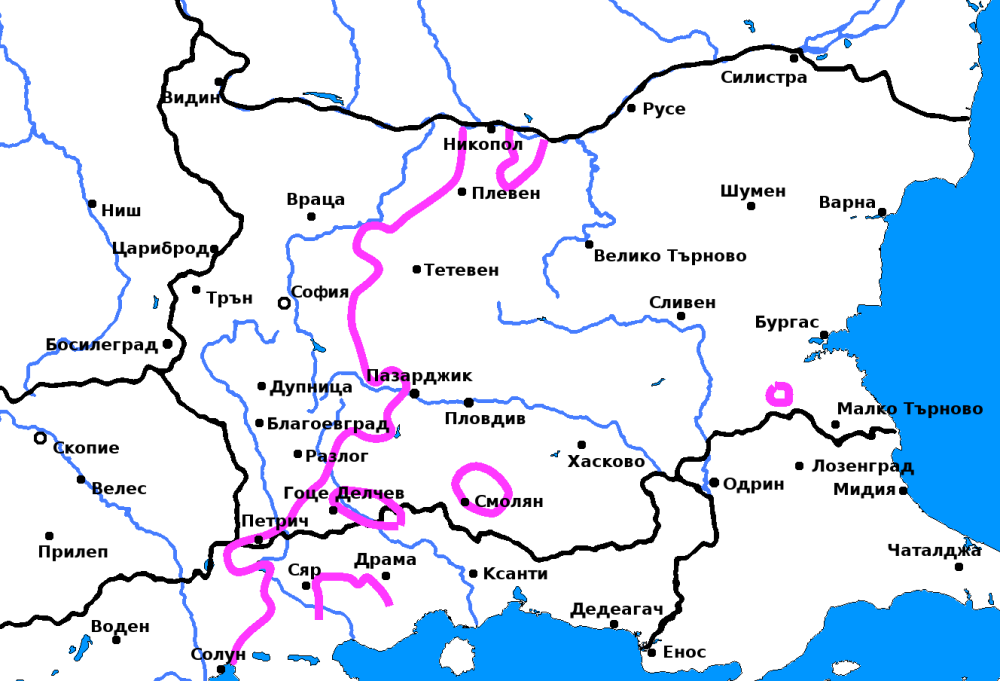
Yat border in the Bulgarian language, splitting the Solun-Voden dialect in two

The Solun-Voden dialect, Lower Vardar dialect, or Kukush-Voden dialect is a South Slavic dialect spoken in parts of the Greek region of Central Macedonia, and the vicinity of Gevgelija and Dojran in the Republic of North Macedonia. It has been treated as part of both Macedonian and Bulgarian dialectology.

== Dialect area ==
The dialect is named after Slavic toponyms for the cities of Thessaloniki (Solun), Edessa (Voden) and Kilkis (Kukush), or after the river Vardar. In terms of Macedonian dialectology, the dialect is classified as a member of the south-eastern subgroup of the Eastern and Southern group of Macedonian dialects, spoken in an area that also covers Veria, Giannitsa, and the towns of Dojran and Gevgelija in the Republic of North Macedonia.

In terms of Bulgarian dialectology, Solun dialect is a separate Eastern Bulgarian dialect, spoken in the northern part of today's Thessaloniki regional unit in Greece. Solun and Ser-Drama dialects are grouped as western Rup dialects, part of the large Rup dialect massif of Rhodopes and Thrace which are transitional between the Western and Eastern Bulgarian dialects. The dialect spoken around Voden and Kukush as well as in the region of the Lower Vardar to the west of Thessaloniki is characterized as Western Bulgarian Kukush-Voden dialect, which shows some connections with Eastern Bulgarian dialects like the reduction and absorption of unstressed vowels and retention of the sound x /x/.

=== Suho-Visoka sub-dialect ===
The Suho-Visoka sub-dialect is spoken in and around the city of Salonika. The dialect is also found in the town of Lagkadas. The dialect was best preserved until the early 20th century in the villages of Sochos (Сухо, Suho), Osa (Висока, Visoka), Nikopoli (Зарово, Zarovo), Xylopoli (Негован, Negovan), Levchohori (Клепе, Klepe), Klisali (Клисали, Klisali) and Assiros (Гвоздово, Gvozdovo). The subdialect has been referred to as Bogdanski Govor (Macedonian: Богдански говор), in reference to its position on the "Bogdan" mountain. One of the first researchers of the Slavic dialects in this part of Macedonia, Slovenian linguist Vatroslav Oblak described the historical development of the Bulgarian phonology and morphology, based mainly on the dialect of Suho and the adjoining area. He noted that the villages Suho, Zarovo and Visoka formed a center of nasalization.

== Phonological characteristics ==
Civil War experiences
Man from Cakoni, Voden region (today Chrysa, Almopia) speaking in the Solun-Voden dialect

- Retention of Proto-Slavic nasal vowels (Solun dialect in the region north-east of Solun): rə ̃ka (mk:raka, bg:rəka), skɤ ̃p (mk:skap, bg:skɤp), pɛ ̃tuk (mk:pɛtok, bg:pɛtək), tʃɛ ̃du (bg, mk:tʃɛdo).
- Retention of vowels ɤ (stressed) or ə (unstressed) which come from Old Church Slavonic ѫ: vəʒa (bg:vəʒɛ), vətuk (bg:vətɤk), gɤska (bg:gɤska), dəɡa (bg:dəga), zəbi (bg:zəbi), mɤka (bg:mɤka), mɤʃ (bg:mɤʒ), pɤrt (bg:prɤt), pɤt (bg:pɤt), prɤtʃki (bg:prɤtʃki), sɤbuta (bg:sɤbɔta), ɡəsɔk (bg:ɡəsɔk), ɡəsɛnitsa (bg:ɡəsɛnitsa), mɤtɛnitsa (bg:mɤtɛnitsa). Less often the vowel u occurs instead of ɤ: kuca (bg:kɤʃta, mk:kuca), kusa (bg:kɤsa), pupka (bg:pɤpka).
- Vowel ɔ replaces Old Church Slavonic ъ: bɔtʃva (bg:bɤtʃva), vɔpka, vɔʃka (bg:vɤʃka), dɔʃ (bg:dɤʒd), zɔlva (bg:zɤlva), sɔn (bg:sɤn), takɔf (bg:takɤv), vətɔk (bg:vətɤk), vɔsɔk (bg:vɔsək)(but also: vətuk, vɔsuk).
- A very important characteristic is the reduction of the wide (unstressed) vowels. This occurs most often in the middle or the beginning of words: ɔ reduces to u — udinitsa (bg:vɔdɛnitsa), mutuvilka (bg:mɔtɔvilka), tutʃilo (bg:tɔtʃilo), usnɔva (bg:ɔsnɔva), uftʃar (bg:ɔvtʃar), usten (bg:ɔsten), utset (bg:ɔtset); ɛ reduces to i — zilɛn, pitɛl, nɛbitɔ, dɛvir, ʒɛnin, molits; a reduces to ə — pəzartʃin, pəspal, kɔmər, kɔkəl, tʃɤrgəta, mandrəta. In some morphological categories this reduction develops further into absorption of the unstressed wide vowels: ɔktɔ (bg:ɔkɔtɔ), litstɔ (bg:litsɛtɔ), duvitsta (bg:vdɔvitsata), grədinta (bg:gradinata), tuvarmɛ (bg:tɔvarimɛ), tuvartɛ (bg:tɔvaritɛ), katʃmɛ (bg:katʃimɛ).
- Generally, the consonant x is retained: in the end of words — vlax, grax, urɛx, strax, sux, vərnax, kəʒax, nusix; in the middle of words — muxlɛsinu, təxtəbita, boxtʃa, sɛdɛxa, bixa, tərtʃaxa. However, in the beginning of words /x/ is often omitted: arnɔ, arman, iʎada, itʃ, ɔrɔ, lɛp.
- The palatals c, jc, ɟ, jɟ predominate over the Old Church Slavonic consonant clusters ʃt and ʒd : nɔc, cɛrka, prifacum, nejcum, lɛjca (mk:lɛca, bg:lɛʃta), sfɛjca (mk:svɛca, bg:svɛʃt), plajcaʃɛ (mk: placaʃɛ, bg:plaʃtaʃɛ); vɛɟi (mk:vɛɟi, bg:vɛʒdi), mɛɟa, saɟa, miɟu, mɛjɟa, sajɟi. In some cases, however, the diphthongs ʃt, ʒd are retained: gaʃti, lɛʃta, guvɛʒdo, prɛʒda.
- Relatively unpredictable stress. Often the stress is on the penult, but there are words which have stress placed on different syllables.

== Morphological characteristics ==
- Definite article -ut, -u for masculine gender: vratut, dɛput, zɛtut, sɔnut, sinut, krumidut, nərodut, ubrazut; ɔginu, guʃtəru, vɛtɛru.
- Definite article -to for plural: bugərɛto, kamənɛto, tsigajnɛto, vulɔvɛto, kojnɛto.
- A single common suffix -um for all three verb present tense conjugations: ɔrum, tsɛpum, pasum, vikum, glɛdum, brɔjum.
- Suffix -m for 1st person singular present tense: pijum, stojum, jadum, ɔdum.

== Other specific characteristics ==
- Enclitic at the beginning of the sentence: Mu gɔ klava petʃatut. Si ja goreʃe furnata.
- Single short form mu for masculine, neutral, feminine, and plural pronouns: Na baba ce mu nɔsum da jədɛ (I'll take something for my grandma to eat). Na starite mu ɛ mɤtʃnɔ (It is hard for old people). Na nih mu davum jadɛjne (I give it/him/them a meal).
- Use of the preposition u instead of the preposition vo :vo selo → u selo (in village)
- Use of the preposition ut instead of ot : ut Solun → od Solun (from/of Solun). This is because ɔ in ɔt when combined with the next word becomes a wide (unstressed) vowel which undergoes reduction (see Phonological characteristics).

Comparison of the Solun-Voden dialect with Standard Bulgarian and Standard Macedonian

Parameter	Solun-Voden dialect	Standard Bulgarian (based on Eastern Bulgarian)	Standard Macedonian	Dupnitsa dialect	Samokov dialect	English
Proto-Slavic *tʲ/*dʲ – Old Church Slavonic щ/жд (ʃt/ʒd)	mixed, predominantly ќ/ѓ (c/ɟ), but also щ/жд (ʃt/ʒd) – леща/меѓу	щ/жд (ʃt/ʒd) – леща/между	ќ/ѓ (c/ɟ) – леќа/меѓу	щ/жд (ʃt/ʒd) – леща/между	щ/жд (ʃt/ʒd) – леща/между	lentils/between
Proto-Slavic *ɡt/kt – Old Church Slavonic щ (ʃt)	ќ (c) – ноќ	щ (ʃt) – нощ	ќ (c) – ноќ	щ (ʃt) – нощ	щ (ʃt) – нощ	night
Old Church Slavonic ѣ (yat)	mixed, я/е (ʲa/ɛ) – бял/бели in the east, е (ɛ) – бел/бели in the west	я/е (ʲa/ɛ) – бял/бели	е (ɛ) – бел/бели	е (ɛ) – бел/бели	е (ɛ) – бел/бели	white
Old Church Slavonic ѫ (yus), approx. ɔ̃	ъ (ə) – мъж, rarely у (u) - пупка	ъ (ə) – мъж	а (a) – маж	а (a) – маж	а (a) – маж	man
Old Church Slavonic ъ (ə)	о (ɔ) – сон	ъ (ə) – сън	о (ɔ) – сон	о (ɔ) – сон	а (a) – сан	dream
Old Church Slavonic лъ/ль	ъл (əl) – сълза	лъ/ъл (lə/əl) – сълза	oл (ɔl) – солза	vocalic l/ъ (ə) – слза/съза depending on region	у (u) – суза	tear
Old Church Slavonic x /x/	Preserved – бях, but often omitted in the beginning of words - убаво	Preserved – бях, хубаво	Lost or replaced by ф/в (f/v) – бев, убаво	Preserved – бех, хубаво	Preserved – бех, хубаво	was, nice
Vowel reduction	Yes	Yes	No	No	No	
Definite article	Single definite article – момчето	Single definite article – момчето	Triple definite article – момчето, момчево, момчено	Single definite article – момчето	Single definite article – момчето	the boy
Ending of verbs in 1st person sing. present tense	only ам – читам, пишувам	а (я) – 1st and 2nd conjugation, ам (ям) – 3rd – чета, пиша	only ам – читам, пишувам	а – 1st and 2nd conjugation, ам – 3rd – чета, пиша	only (и/е)м – четем, пишем	(I) read, (I) write
Formation of past perfect tense	бех/бях + past participle – бех писал, бях молил	бях + past participle – бях писал, бях молил	имам + past passive aorist participle – имам пишано, имам молено	бeх + past participle – бех писал, бех молил	бех + past participle – бех писал, бeх молил	(I) had read, (I) had written
Word stress	Dynamic - доби́ток, пера́м	Dynamic - доби́тък, пера́	Fixed antepenultimate - до́биток, пе́рам	Dynamic – доби́ток, пера́	Dynamic – доби́ток, пере́м	cattle, (I) wash

== Typical Words ==
- ʒarba (bg,mk:ʒaba) - frog
- ʃarino (bg,mk:ʃareno) - coloured
- kutʃja (bg,mk:kutʃɛ) - dog
- kɤʃta (bg:kɤʃta, mk:kuќa) - house
- druguʃ (bg:drug pɤt, mk:drug pat) - another time
- vɔpka
