= Kriva Palanka dialect =

Dialect of Macedonian

Kriva Palanka
- Кривопаланечки дијалект Krivopalanečki dijalekt
- Native to: North Macedonia
- Region: Kriva Palanka
- Native speakers: c. 20,000 (2002)
- Language family: Indo-European: Balto-Slavic; Slavic; South Slavic; Eastern South Slavic; Macedonian; Northern (Torlakian); Eastern; Kriva Palanka
- Writing system: Cyrillic (Macedonian alphabet)

Language codes
- ISO 639-3: –
- Glottolog: kriv1234
- IETF: mk-u-sd-mk702
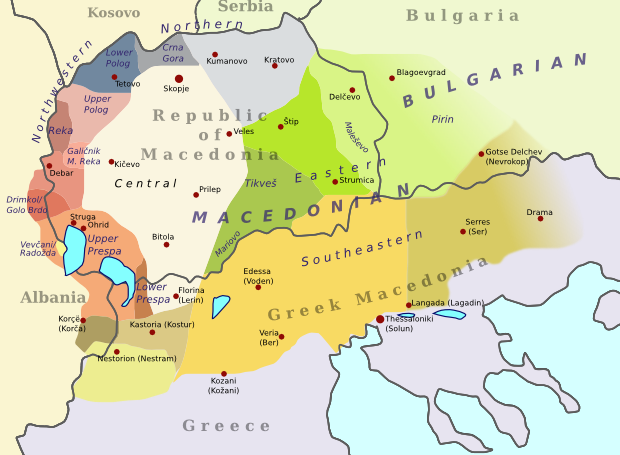
- Location of the Kriva Palanka dialect among other Macedonian dialects

The Three Saints
Excerpt of a story from Ginovci told in Kriva Palanka dialect

The Kriva Palanka dialect (Macedonian: Кривопаланечки дијалект, Krivopalanečki dijalekt) is a member of the eastern subgroup of the northern group of dialects of Macedonian. This dialect is mainly spoken in the city of Kriva Palanka and surrounding villages.

== Phonological characteristics ==
- use of A instead of E: трева / treva > трава / trava;
- use of the letter U instead of the letter A: рака / raka > рука / ruka (hand), пат / pat > пут / put (road);

== Morphological characteristics ==
- imperfective verbs are typically derived from perfective verbs by means of the suffix –ue (e.g. зборуе and текнуе)
- use of the preposition U (in).

=== Personal pronouns ===
Singular:

- Ја / ја (I)
- Ти / ti (you)
- Он / on (he)
- Она / ona (she)
- Оно / ono (it)
