= Prizren–Timok dialect =

Torlak dialect of Serbia and Kosovo

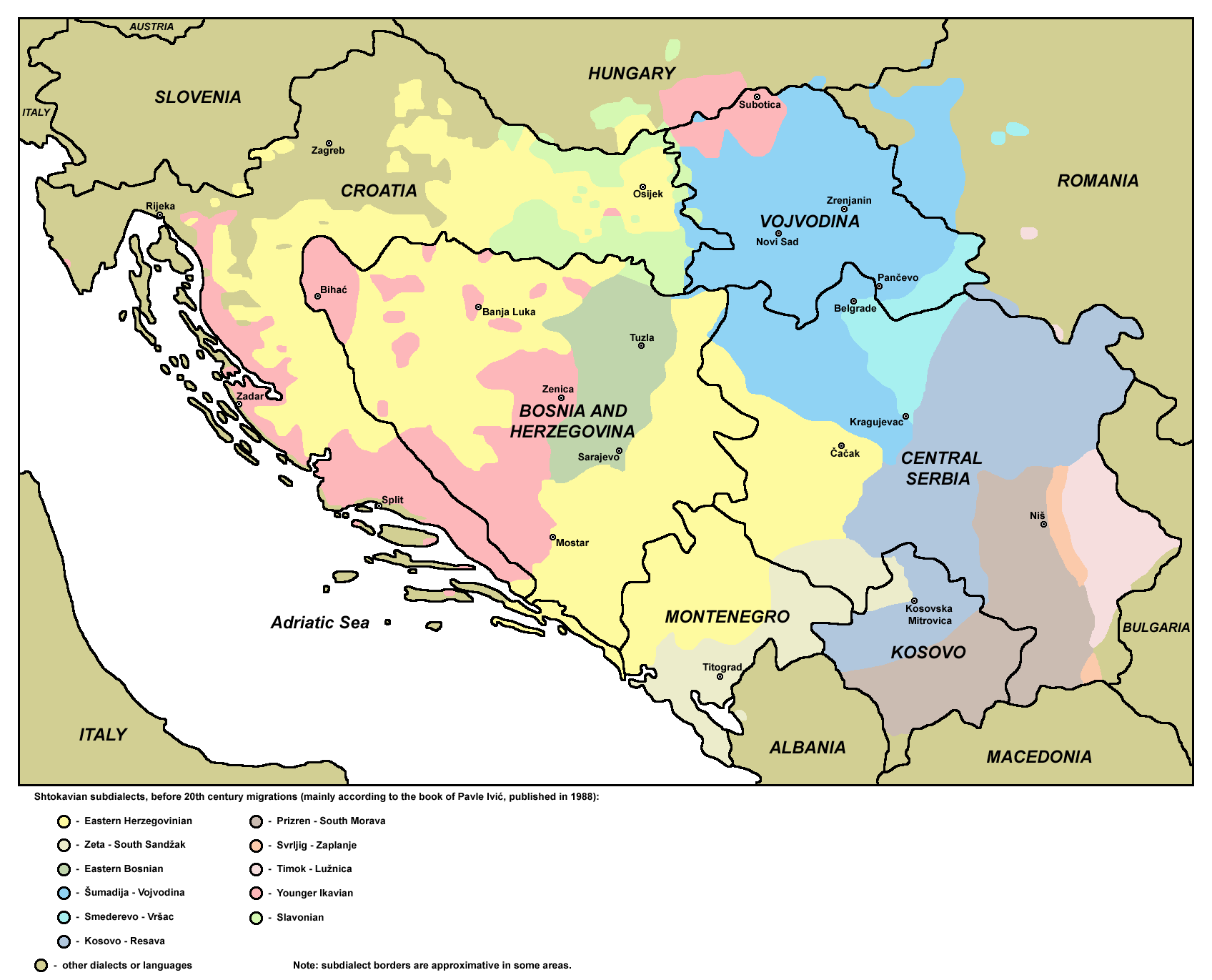
Map of Shtokavian subdialects before 20th century migrations; Prizren-Timok subdialect area shown in brown, orange, and pink

The Prizren–Timok dialect (Serbian: призренско–тимочки дијалект / prizrensko–timočki dijalekt) is the name given by Serbian linguists to classify transitional Torlak dialects spoken in Southern Serbia and Kosovo – an area spanning from Prizren in the south to the Timok river in the north – as subdialects of Old-Shtokavian. Its eastern border, starting from Zaječar, roughly forms the border with Bulgaria.

== Subdialects ==
- Prizren–South Morava subdialect (призренско–јужноморавски поддијалект / prizrensko–južnomoravski poddijalekt)
  - Vranje speech (врањански говор / vranjanski govor)
  - Gora speech (горански говор / goranski govor)
- Svrljig–Zaplanje subdialect (сврљишко–заплањски поддијалект / svrljiško–zaplanjski poddijalekt)
- Timok–Lužnica subdialect (тимочко–лужнички поддијалект / timočko–lužnički poddijalekt)
  - Pirot speech (пиротски говор / pirotski govor)
  - Crna Trava speech (црнотравски говор / crnotravski govor)
  - Lužnica speech (лужнички говор / lužnički govor)
