= Inferential mood =

Grammatical mood for secondhand knowledge

The inferential mood (abbreviated INFER or INFR) is used to report a nonwitnessed event without confirming it, but the same forms also function as admiratives in the Balkan languages (namely Albanian, Bulgarian, Macedonian and Turkish) in which they occur. The inferential mood is used in some languages such as Turkish to convey information about events which were not directly observed or were inferred by the speaker. When referring to Balkan languages, it is often called renarrative mood; when referring to Estonian, it is called oblique mood.

The inferential is usually impossible to be distinguishably translated into English. For instance, indicative Bulgarian той отиде, toy otide and Turkish o gitti will be translated the same as inferential той отишъл, toy otishal and o gitmiş—with the English indicative 'he went'. (Note: For a more precise rendering, it would be possible to also translate these as "he reportedly went" or "he is said to have gone" (or even "apparently, he went") although, clearly, these long constructions would be impractical in an entire text composed in this tense.) Using the first pair, however, implies very strongly that the speaker either witnessed the event or is very sure that it took place. The second pair implies either that the speaker did not in fact witness it take place, that it occurred in the remote past or that there is considerable doubt as to whether it actually happened. If it were necessary to make the distinction, then the English constructions "he must have gone" or "he is said to have gone" would partly translate the inferential.

== Renarrative in the Balkan languages ==
Writing on the typology of evidentiality in Balkan languages, Victor Friedman systematizes the facts in the following way:

As grammaticalized in the Balkan languages, evidentiality encodes the speaker's evaluation of the narrated event, often, but not always, predicated upon the nature of the available evidence. These evidentials can be of two types: Confirmative (sometimes called 'witnessed') and nonconfirmative (sometimes called 'reported', 'inferential', and/or 'nonwitnessed'). The nonconfirmatives can, in Austin's terms, be felicitous (neutral) or infelicitous. Felicitous nonconfirmatives are used for reports, inferences, etc., for which the speaker chooses not to take responsibility. An infelicitous nonconfirmative expresses either acceptance of a previously unexpected state of affairs (surprise, i.e. something the speaker would not have been willing to confirm prior to discovery, the mirative or admirative) or sarcastic rejection of a previous statement (doubt, irony, etc., the dubitative).

Ibid., "Illustrative data (interlinear glossing is omitted to save space): [...]

Ai qenka i pasur! (Albanian, nonconfirmative present)
Ku qenka mjeshtri? (Albanian, nonconfirmative present)
Тој бил богат! (Macedonian, nonconfirmative past)
Той щял да ме набие. (Bulgarian, doubtful future)
Каде бил мајсторот? (Macedonian, nonconfirmative past)
Ама вие сте били тук. (Bulgarian, nonconfirmative present)
O zenginmiş! (Turkish, nonconfirmative past)
Patron neredeymiş? (Turkish, nonconfirmative past)
He is rich! (The nonconfirmative refers to surprise in the discovery of a preexisting state.)
Where is the boss? (Surprise at the boss's absence; Albanian can have true present meaning, while Balkan Slavic and Turkish cannot.)

In Bulgarian, even though a state of affairs may be entirely undisputed by the speaker, he or she may choose to use the renarrative in order to present disagreement with the actions or opinion of the speaker:

Обиждаш го не за друго, ами защото бил богат
(You're insulting him for no other reason than for the fact that he's rich)

Grammatically, this could be seen as a way for the speaker to be demonstratively re-narrating the event (the insult) back to the listener in order for them to pause and consider their actions.

Present and future tenses also exist for such a mood in the above-mentioned languages, but, with the exception of the Albanian true nonconfirmative present illustrated above, these "nonconfirmatives, (from perfects), always have a past reference to either a real or a putative narrated event, speech event, or state of mind. They cannot be used with true nonpast reference."

Do t'u hapka një universitet privat (Albanian: A private university will be opened — apparently, i.e. as reported by someone & to my surprise.)
Varacakmış (Turkish: He will be arriving — as told by someone)

=== True renarrative ===
Often, there is no doubt as to the veracity of the statement (for example, if it was on the news), but simply the fact that the speaker was not personally present at the event forces them to use this mood (such as the Turkish varacakmış, above, or the Bulgarian той отишъл (Note: In Bulgarian, the indicative would be incorrect here, at least for the first time or several times the topic is discussed. Once everyone present becomes familiar enough with the idea, however, then they may feel comfortable enough to switch to the indicative.)). In this sense, the renarrative could be considered a realis mood.

=== News reports ===
News headlines (in Bulgaria and Turkey, at least) are rarely presented in this mood, but rather in the indicative preterite—even though in most cases the reporters clearly did not witness the events being reported. (Note: Exceptions, of course, do occur when the situation requires it—for example if a predicted/probable/possible future event is being referred to, e.g. токът щял да поскъпне—"energy prices set to rise"; or if an as-yet unverified report is received and immediately reported on; or if it is a somewhat unconventional or "unexpected" state of affairs, e.g. "Станишев носел очила, за да изглежда по-умен"—"[Prime Minister] Stanishev (says that) he wears glasses in order to appear cleverer", where "wears", in the admirative, highlights the unconventional reason which follows.)

The main body of the news report tends to use the renarrative correctly; but sometimes, again, it is intentionally avoided. This is especially so when sensitive or controversial subject matter is being dealt with. This is because, due to its ambiguity, the renarrative in such cases could be perceived as a passing of judgement or expression of doubt by the reporter, rather than as a simple renarration. In such cases, constructions with a directly-cited source reference such as "the minister said that + indicative" are preferred.

== See also ==
- Balkan sprachbund
- Irrealis mood
