= Kumanovo dialect =

Dialect of Macedonian

The Kumanovo dialect (Macedonian: Кумановски дијалект, Kumanovski dijalekt) is a member of the eastern subgroup of the Northern group of dialects of Macedonian. It belongs to the so-called Prizren-Timok dialects, also known as Torlakian. The dialect is typical for the northern dialect of Macedonian and is very well known because of the use of some cases, such as the locative case. The Kumanovo dialect is spoken mainly in the city of Kumanovo and the surrounding villages. The dialect is closely related to the neighboring Kriva Palanka dialect. The Kumanovo dialect can be found in literary works, such as the famous play “Lenče Kumanovče” written by Vasil Iljoski in 1928. The Kumanovo dialect is especially popular as a source of humor in the spoken media, whereas the print media tend to favor Western dialect forms for humorous anecdotes and quotations in local news stories. The most significant example where the Kumanovo dialect is used in a humorous way is the festival Tumba Fest.

== Phonological characteristics ==
- use of A instead of E: трева / treva > трава / trava;
- use of the letter U instead of the letter A as a reflex of Proto-Slavic *ǫ: рака / raka > рука / ruka (hand), пат / pat > пут / put (road);
- the old syllabic L is changed into U/ LU/ LA: волк / volk > вук / vuk (wolf), сонце / sonce > слăнце / sl'nce (sun).
- use of palatal J at the beginning of the word: јазик / jazik > език / ezik (tongue),

== Morphological characteristics ==
- use of the suffix -V in third-person plural: тие имаа / tie imaa > они имава/имасва / oni imava/imasva (they had);
- use of the suffix E for plural feminine nouns instead of the suffix -I: торби/ torbi > торбе / torbe (bags).
- Use of KUDE instead of KADE (where).
- Use of the forms gu and ga instead of the forms go and i: њега га виде / njega ga vide (I saw him).

=== Personal pronouns ===
Personal pronouns
Number	Person		Subject Nominative	Direct Complement Accusative		Indirect Complement		
Number	Person		Subject Nominative	Direct Complement Accusative		no preposition Dative		preposition
Number	Person		Subject Nominative	full	short	full	short possessive	preposition
Singular	First		ја	мене	ме	на мене	ми	мене
Singular	Second		ти	тебе	те	на тебе	ти	тебе
Singular	Third	Masculine	он	њега	га	на њега	му	њега
Singular	Third	Feminine	она	њума	гу	на њума	ву	њума
Singular	Third	Neuter	оно	њега	га	на њега	му	њега
Plural	First		ми	нас	нѐ	на нас	ни	нас
Plural	Second		ви	вас	ве	на вас	ви	вас
Plural	Third		они	њима	ги	на њима	ги	њима

== Possessive pronouns ==
Possessive pronouns
Number	Person		Masculine		Feminine		Neuter		Plural		Short form
Number	Person		nominative	oblique	nominative	oblique	nominative	oblique	nominative	oblique	Short form
Singular	First		мој	моега	моја	моју	мое	мое	мои	мои	ми
Singular	Second		твој	твоега	твоја	твоју	твое	твое	твои	твои	ти
Singular	Third	Masculine	његов	његовога	његова	његову	његово	његово	његови	његови	му
Singular	Third	Feminine	њојан	њојнога	њојна	њојну	њојно	њојно	њојни	њојни	ву
Singular	Third	Neuter	његов	његовога	његова	његову	његово	његово	његови	његови	му
Plural	First		наш	нашега	наша	нашу	наше	наше	наши	наши	ни
Plural	Second		ваш	вашега	ваша	вашу	ваше	ваше	ваши	ваши	ви
Plural	Third		њини	њинога	њина	њину	њино	њино	њини	њини	им

=== Demonstrative pronouns ===
Demonstrative pronouns
Case	Masculine	Feminine	Neuter	Plural
Nominative	тăј, овăј, онăј	тај, овај, онај	тој, овој, оној	тија, овија, онија
Oblique	тога, овога, онога	туј, овуј, онуј	тој, овој, оној	тија, овија, онија

=== Nominal inflection ===
Nominal inflection
Gender	Nominative	Oblique
Masculine (sg.)	муж	мужа
Masculine (pl.)	мужи	мужи
Feminine (sg.)	жена	жену
Feminine (pl.)	жене	жене
Neuter (sg.)	дете	дете
Neuter (pl.)	деца	деца

=== Adjectival inflection ===
Adjectival inflection: добар ('good')
Gender	Nominative	Oblique
Masculine (sg.)	добар	доброга
Masculine (pl.)	добри	добри
Feminine (sg.)	добра	добру
Feminine (pl.)	добри	добри
Neuter (sg.)	добро	добро
Neuter (pl.)	добри	добри

== Examples of the dialect ==
The Poor Man
Excerpt of a story from Matejče told in the Kumanovo dialect.

- A song that is very well known in North Macedonia and typical for the Kumanovo dialect:

Три невесте тикве брале, бре
три невесте тикве брале, бре
три невесте тикве брале, бре, бре, бре
тикве брале, бре.

Куде брале туј заспале, бре
куде брале туј заспале, бре
куде брале туј заспале, бре, бре, бре
туј заспале, бре.

=== Phrases ===
- Кумановци не се претопуев лăко, на свој дијалект зборив куде и да су
  - Kumanovci ne se pretopuev lăko, na svoj dijalekt zboriv kude i da su ("The people from Kumanovo cannot be assimilated easily, they speak their own dialect wherever they are")
- Полăко ќе научиш англиски да пишуеш и читаш неголи кумановски
  - Polăko ḱe naučiš angliski da pišueš i čitaš negoli kumanovski ("You will learn to write and read English more easily than the Kumanovo dialect")
