= Northern Macedonian dialects =

Group of dialects of Macedonian

The Northern Macedonian dialects are one of three groups of Macedonian. The group is located in the northern and northeastern areas of North Macedonia, surrounding the cities and towns of Tetovo, Skopje, Kumanovo, Kratovo, Kriva Palanka, and Sveti Nikole. The group of Northern Macedonian dialects is divided into two subgroups: the western group and the eastern group.

== Dialects ==
=== Western group ===
- Tetovo dialect (Lower Polog dialect)
- Skopska Crna Gora dialect
- Gora dialect

=== Eastern group ===
- Kumanovo dialect
- Kratovo dialect
- Kriva Palanka dialect
- Ovče Pole dialect
