= Belovište, Jegunovce =

Belovište Беловиште
- Village
- Location within North Macedonia
- Coordinates: 42.135877°N 21.104838°E
- Country: North Macedonia
- Region: Polog
- Municipality: Jegunovce

Population (2002)
  - Total: 311
- Time zone: UTC+1 (CET)
  - Summer (DST): UTC+2 (CEST)
- Car plates: TE

Belovište (Macedonian: Беловиште) is a village in the municipality of Jegunovce, North Macedonia. It used to be part of the former municipality of Vratnica.

== Demographics ==
Belovište is attested in the 1467/68 Ottoman tax registry (defter) for the Nahiyah of Kalkandelen. The village had a total of 19 Christian households and 1 bachelor.

According to the 2002 census, the village had a total of 311 inhabitants. Ethnic groups in the village include:

- Macedonians 303
- Serbs 7
- Albanians 1
