= Southern and Eastern Macedonian dialects =

Group of East South Slavic dialects

The Southern and Eastern Macedonian dialects according to one of the scientific views are one of three groups of Macedonian.

The group is located in the eastern and southeastern areas of North Macedonia, surrounding the cities of Štip, Strumica, and Delčevo. The group also includes Blagoevgrad Province, or Pirin Macedonia, in Bulgaria, and Macedonia, or Aegean Macedonia, Greece. The group of Southern and Eastern Macedonian dialects is divided into three subgroups: the eastern group, the southwestern group, and the southeastern group.

== Dialects ==
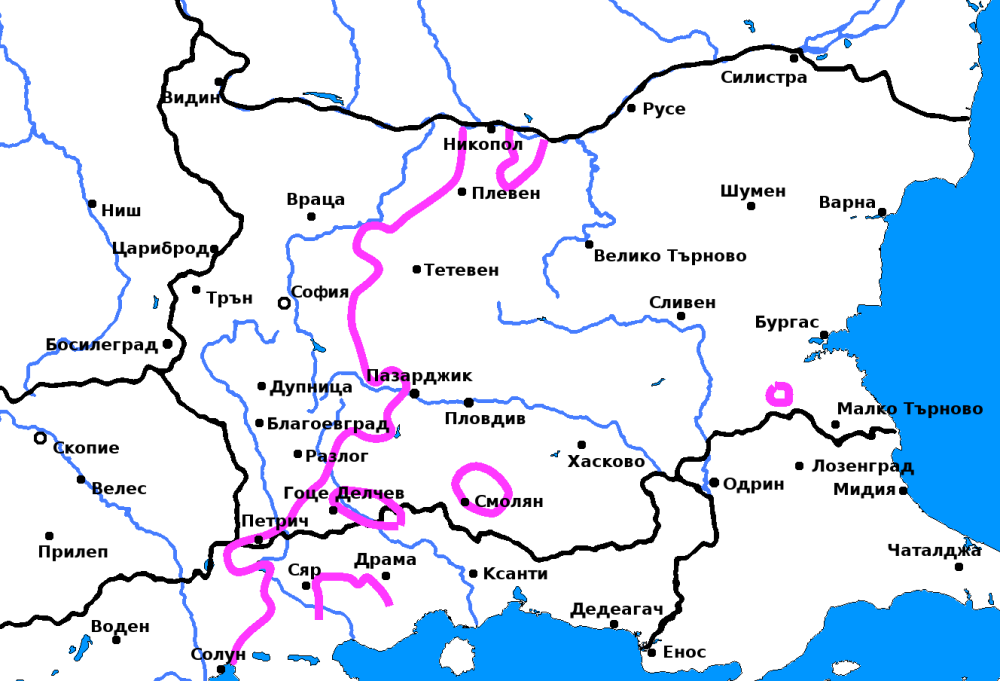
Yat border in the Bulgarian language, splitting the Southern and Eastern Macedonian dialects in two

=== Eastern group ===
- Tikveš-Mariovo dialect
- Štip-Strumica dialect
- Maleševo-Pirin dialect

=== Southwestern group ===
- Nestram-Kostenar dialect
- Korča dialect
- Kostur dialect

=== Southeastern group ===
- Solun-Voden dialect
- Ser-Drama-Lagadin-Nevrokop dialect

Based on the main isogloss separating the Bulgarian dialects into Eastern and Western - yat border, some of the Southern and Eastern Macedonian dialects are classified as Eastern Bulgarian.
