= Torlak dialects =

Group of South Slavic dialects

Torlak
- Native to: Serbia, Bulgaria, North Macedonia, Kosovo, Romania
- Ethnicity: Serbs, Bulgarians, Macedonians, Krashovani, Gorani
- Language family: Indo-European: Balto-Slavic; Slavic; South; Torlak
- Writing system: Cyrillic; Latin

Language codes
- ISO 639-3: –
- Glottolog: nort2595 Northern Macedonian (partial match) piri1234 Pirin-Malashevo tran1292 Transitional Bulgarian priz1234 Prizren-South Morava
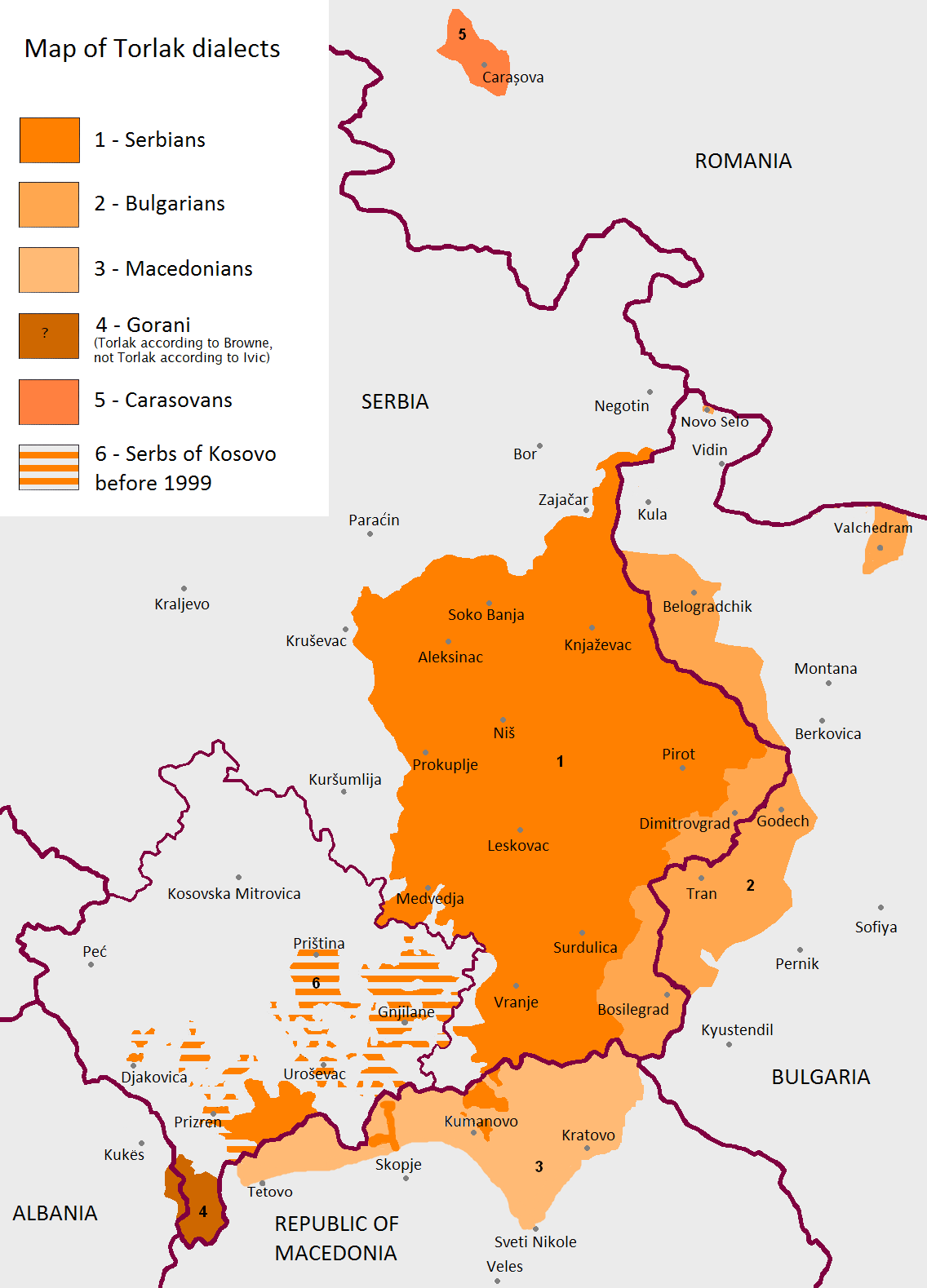
- Areas where Torlak dialects are spoken.

Torlak is a group of transitional South Slavic dialects spoken across southeastern Serbia, southern and eastern Kosovo, northern North Macedonia, and northwestern Bulgaria. Torlak, together with Bulgarian and Macedonian, falls into the Balkan Slavic linguistic area, which is part of the broader Balkan sprachbund.

Torlak is not standardized, and its subdialects vary significantly in some features. Serbian linguists traditionally classified it as an old Shtokavian dialect or as a fourth supradialect of Serbo-Croatian along with Shtokavian, Chakavian, and Kajkavian. Bulgarian scholars classify it as a Western Bulgarian dialect, in which case it is referred to as a Transitional Bulgarian dialect. According to UNESCO's list of endangered languages, Torlak is a vulnerable distinct language.

In Bulgarian common speech, the Torlak dialects are traditionally referred to as U-dialects (Bulgarian: У-говори), referencing their reflex of old Slavic *ǫ being /u/ (compared to standard Bulgarian, where it is /ɤ/, or its nearby dialects, where it is /a/).

The Serbo-Croatian linguists maintain that Torlak is a Balkanized Western South Slavic dialect together with the South Slavic varieties spoken in northern parts of North Macedonia and in Western Bulgaria (Vuković 2021). Other researchers tend to classify it as Eastern South Slavic. Motoki Nomachi maintains that the Torlak dialects are foreign to standard Serbian in many cases. According to the historian Ivo Banac, during the Middle Ages, Torlak and the Eastern Herzegovinian dialect were part of Eastern South Slavic, but since the 12th century, especially the Shtokavian dialects, including Eastern Herzegovinian, began to diverge from the other neighboring South Slavic dialects.

Some of the phenomena that distinguish western and eastern subgroups of the South Slavic languages can be explained by two separate migratory waves of different Slavic tribal groups of the future South Slavs via two routes: the west and east of the Carpathian Mountains.

Speakers of the dialectal group are primarily ethnic Serbs, Bulgarians, and Macedonians. There are also smaller ethnic communities of Croats (the Krashovani in Romania, Janjevci in Kosovo) and Slavic Muslims (the Gorani and Bosniaks) in southern Kosovo.

== Classification ==
The Torlaks have been distinguished from other South Slavic languages since at least the 16th century and their dialects form an intermediate between the Eastern and Western branches of South Slavic dialect continuum, and have been variously described, in whole or in parts, as belonging to either group. In the 19th century, they were often called Bulgarian, but their classification was contested between Serbian and Bulgarian writers. Previously, the designation "Torlak" was not applied to the dialects of Niš and the neighbouring areas to the east and south.

=== Balkan sprachbund ===
The Torlak dialects, together with Bulgarian and Macedonian, display many properties of the Balkan linguistic area, a set of structural convergence features shared also with other, non-Slavic, languages of the Balkans such as Albanian, Romanian and Aromanian. In terms of areal linguistics, they have therefore been described as part of a prototypical "Balkan Slavic" area, as opposed to other parts of Serbo-Croatian, which are only peripherally involved in the convergence area. The Dutch linguist Willem Vermeer describes Torlak as a creole language influenced by Albanian and Romanian.

=== Balkan linguists ===
==== Serbian linguists ====
Vuk Stefanović Karadžić, one of the most important reformers of modern Serbian language, defines a Torlak as "a man who speaks neither Serbian nor Bulgarian well". Serbian linguists (like Pavle Ivić and Asim Peco) classify Torlak (Serbo-Croatian: torlački / торлачки, pronounced [tɔ̌rlaːt͡ʃkiː]) as an Old-Shtokavian dialect, referring to it as the Prizren–Timok dialect.

- Pavle Ivić, in his textbook of Serbo-Croatian dialectology (1956), treated the "Prizren–Timok dialect zone" as part of the overall Shtokavian zone.
- Aleksandar Belić classified the Prizren–Timok dialect as "fundamentally Serbian", as well as claimed that the Western Bulgarian dialects were Serbian.
- Dejan Krstić in his scientific paper "Ideas of the Pirot region population that concern the term the Torlaks" has claimed that the term Torlaks was and is used to refer to the bilingual Vlachs in Pirot and Timok area.

==== Bulgarian linguists ====
Bulgarian researchers such as Benyo Tsonev, Gavril Zanetov and the Macedono-Bulgarian researcher Krste Misirkov classified Torlak (Bulgarian: Торлашки, romanized: Torlashki) as dialect of the Bulgarian language. They noted the manner of the articles, the loss of most of the cases, etc. Today Bulgarian linguists (Stoyko Stoykov, Rangel Bozhkov) also classify Torlak as a "Belogradchik-Tran" dialect of Bulgarian, and claim that it should be classified outside the Shtokavian area. Stoykov further argued that the Torlak dialects have a grammar that is closer to Bulgarian and that this is indicative of them being originally Bulgarian.

==== Macedonian linguists ====
In Macedonian dialectology, the Torlak (Macedonian: Торлачки, romanized: Torlački) varieties spoken in North Macedonia (Kumanovo, Kratovo and Kriva Palanka dialect) are classified as part of a northeastern group of Macedonian dialects.

== Features ==
=== Vocabulary ===
Basic Torlak vocabulary shares most of its Slavic roots with Bulgarian, Macedonian and Serbian but also over time borrowed a number of words from Aromanian, Greek, Turkish, and Albanian in the Gora region of the Šar Mountains. It also preserved many words which in the "major" languages became archaisms or changed meaning. Like other features, vocabulary is inconsistent across subdialects, for example, a Krashovan does not necessarily understand a Goranac.

The varieties spoken in the Slavic countries have been heavily influenced by the standardized national languages, particularly when a new word or concept was introduced. The only exception is a form of Torlak spoken in Romania, which escaped the influence of a standardized language which has existed in Serbia since a state was created after the withdrawal of the Ottoman Empire. The Slavs indigenous to the region are called Krashovani and are a mixture of original settler Slavs and later settlers from the Timok Valley in eastern Serbia.

=== Cases lacking inflections ===
Bulgarian and Macedonian are the only two modern Slavic languages that lost virtually the entire noun case system, with nearly all nouns now in the surviving nominative case. This is partly true of the Torlak dialect. In the northwest, the instrumental case merges with the accusative case, and the locative and genitive cases merge with the nominative case. Further south, all inflections disappear and syntactic meaning is determined solely by prepositions.

=== H-dropping ===
Macedonian, Torlak and a number of Serbian and Bulgarian dialects, unlike all other Slavic languages, technically lack the phonemes [x], [ɦ] or [h]. In other Slavic languages, [x] or [ɦ] (the latter from Proto-Slavic *g in "H-Slavic languages") is common.

The appearance of the letter h in the alphabet is reserved mostly for loanwords and toponyms within the Republic of North Macedonia but outside of the standard language region. In Macedonian, this is the case with eastern towns such as Pehčevo. In fact, the Macedonian language is based in Prilep, Pelagonia and words such as thousand and urgent are iljada and itno in standard Macedonian but hiljada and hitno in Serbian (also, Macedonian oro, ubav vs. Bulgarian horo, hubav (folk dance, beautiful)). This is actually a part of an isogloss, a dividing line separating Prilep from Pehčevo in the Republic of North Macedonia at the southern extreme, and reaching central Serbia (Šumadija) at a northern extreme. In Šumadija, local folk songs may still use the traditional form of I want being oću (оћу) compared with hoću (хоћу) as spoken in standard Serbian.

=== Syllabic /l/ ===
Some versions of Torlak have retained the syllabic /l/, which, like /r/, can serve the nucleus of a syllable. In most of the Shtokavian dialects, the syllabic /l/ eventually became /u/ or /o/. In standard Bulgarian, it is preceded by the vowel represented by ъ ([ɤ]) to separate consonant clusters. Naturally, the /l/ becomes velarized in most such positions, giving [ɫ]. In some dialects, most notably the Leskovac dialect, the word-final -l has instead shifted into the vocal cluster -(i)ja; for example the word пекал became пекја (to bake). Word-medially however the syllabic /l/ remains unaltered.

Torlak	Krashovan (Caraș)	влк /vɫk/	пекъл /pɛkəl/	сълза /səɫza/	жлт /ʒɫt/
Torlak	Northern (Svrljig)	вук /vuk/	пекал /pɛkəɫ/	суза /suza/	жлът /ʒlət/
Torlak	Central (Lužnica)	вук /vuk/	пекл /pɛkəɫ/	слза /sləza/	жлт /ʒlət/
Torlak	Southern (Vranje)	влк /vlk/	пекал /pɛkal/	солза /sɔɫza/	жлт /ʒəɫt/
Torlak	Western (Prizren)	вук /vuk/	пекл /pɛkɫ/	слуза /sluza/	жлт /ʒlt/
Torlak	Eastern (Tran)	вук /vuk/	пекл /pɛkɫ/	слза /slza/	жлт /ʒlt/
Torlak	North-Eastern (Belogradchik)	влк /vlk/	пекл /pɛkɫ/	слза /slza/	жлт /ʒlt/
Torlak	South-Eastern (Kumanovo)	вук /vuk/	пекъл /pɛkəɫ/	слза /slza/	жут /ʒut/
Standard Serbo-Croatian		вук, vuk /ʋûːk/	пекао, pekao /pêkao/	суза, suza /sûza/	жут, žut /ʒûːt/
Standard Bulgarian		вълк /vɤɫk/	пекъл /pɛkɐɫ/	сълза /sɐɫza/	жълт /ʒɤɫt/
Standard Macedonian		волк /vɔlk/	печел /pɛtʃɛl/	солза /sɔlza/	жолт /ʒɔlt/
English		wolf	(have) baked	tear	yellow

=== Features shared with Eastern South Slavic ===
- Loss of most grammatical cases as in Bulgarian and Macedonian (some Torlak dialects, however, retain the accusative case, while Bulgarian and Macedonian do not).
- Loss of infinitive as in Bulgarian and Macedonian, present in Serbian.
- Full retention of the aorist and the imperfect, as in Bulgarian.
- Use of a definite article as in Bulgarian and Macedonian, lacking in Serbian (Torlak uses three definite articles like Macedonian, a feature lost in standard Bulgarian).
- ə for Old Church Slavonic ь and ъ in all positions: sən, dən (Bulgarian sən, den; Serbian san, dan; Macedonian son, den), including in the place of OCS suffixes -ьць, -ьнъ (Bulgarian -ec, -en; Serbian -ac, -an; Macedonian -ec, -en).
- Lack of phonetic pitch and length as in Bulgarian and Macedonian, present in Serbian.
- Frequent stress on the final syllable in polysyllabic words, impossible in Serbian and Macedonian (Bulgarian že'na, Serbian and Macedonian 'žena).
- Preservation of final l, which in Serbian developed to o (Bulgarian and Macedonian bil, Serbian bio).
- Comparative degree of adjectives formed with the particle po as in Eastern South Slavic ubav, poubav, Serbian lep, lepši.
- Lack of epenthetic l, as in Eastern South Slavic zdravje/zdrave, Serbian zdravlje
- Use of što pronoun meaning what, as in Eastern South Slavic rather than šta as in standard Serbian (što also preserved in some Croatian dialects) and of the standard Bulgarian kakvo (often shortened to kvo).

=== Features shared with Western South Slavic ===
In all Torlak dialects:

- ǫ gave rounded u like in Shtokavian Serbian, unlike unrounded ъ in literary Bulgarian and a in Macedonian
- vь- gave u in Western, v- in Eastern
- *čr gave cr in Western, but was preserved in Eastern
- Distinction between Proto-Slavic /ɲ/ and /n/ is lost in Eastern (S.-C. njega, Bulgarian nego).
- Voiced consonants in final position are not subject to devoicing (Serbian grad (written and pronounced), Bulgarian/Macedonian pronounced /grat/
- *vs stays preserved without metathesis in Eastern (S.-C. sve, Bulgarian vse, simplified in Macedonian to se)
- Accusative njega as in Serbian, unlike old accusative on O in Eastern (nego)
- Nominative plural of nomina on -a is on -e in Western, -i in Eastern
- Ja 'I, ego' in Western, (j)as in Eastern
- Mi 'we' in Western, nie in Eastern
- First person singular of verbs is -m in Western, and the old reflex of *ǫ in Eastern
- suffixes *-itjь (-ić) and *-atja (-ača) are common in Western, not known in Eastern

In some Torlak dialects:

- Distinction between the plural of masculine, feminine and neuter adjectives is preserved only in Western (S.C. beli, bele, bela), not in Eastern (beli for masc., fem. and neutr.), does not occur in Belogradchik area; in some eastern regions there is just a masculine and feminine form.
- The proto-Slavic *tj, *dj which gave respectively ć, đ in Serbo-Croatian, št, žd in Bulgarian and ќ, ѓ in Macedonian, is represented by the Serbian form in the west and northwest and by the hybrid č, dž in the east: Belogradchik and Tran, as well as Pirot, Gora, northern Macedonia. The Macedonian form occurs around Kumanovo.

== Dialects ==
- Prizren–Timok dialect
- Transitional Bulgarian dialects
- Kumanovo dialect
- Gora dialect
- Krashovani

== Literature ==
Literature written in Torlak is rather sparse as the dialect has never been an official state language. During the Ottoman rule literacy in the region was limited to Eastern Orthodox clergy, who chiefly used Old Church Slavonic in writing. The first known literary document influenced by Torlak dialects is the Manuscript from Temska Monastery from 1762, in which its author, the Monk Kiril Zhivkovich from Pirot, considered his language "simple Bulgarian".

== Ethnography ==
According to one theory, the name Torlak derived from the South Slavic word tor ('sheepfold'), possibly referring to the fact that Torlaks in the past were mainly shepherds by occupation. Some Bulgarian scientists describe the Torlaks as a distinct ethnographic group. Another theory is that it is derived from Ottoman Turkish torlak ('unbearded youth'), possibly referring to some portion of the youth among them not developing dense facial hair. The Torlaks are also sometimes classified as part of the Shopi population and vice versa. In the 19th century, there was no exact border between Torlak and Shopi settlements. According to some authors, during Ottoman rule, a majority of the Torlak population did not have national consciousness in an ethnic sense.

Therefore, both Serbs and Bulgarians considered local Slavs as part of their own people and the local population was also divided between sympathy for Bulgarians and Serbs. Other authors take a different view and maintain that the inhabitants of the Torlak area had begun to develop predominantly Bulgarian national consciousness. With Ottoman influence ever weakening, the increase of nationalist sentiment in the Balkans in late 19th and early 20th century, and the redrawing of national boundaries after the Treaty of Berlin (1878), the Balkan Wars and World War I, the borders in the Torlak-speaking region changed several times between Serbia and Bulgaria, and later the Republic of North Macedonia.

== See also ==
- Balkan sprachbund
- Gorani
- Krashovani
- Shopi
- Shtokavian dialect
