= Gora dialect =

Variety of South Slavic spoken by the Gorani people

Gorani
- našinski
- Native to: Kosovo, Albania and North Macedonia
- Ethnicity: Gorani
- Native speakers: 60,000 (2011 census)
- Language family: Indo-European: Balto-Slavic; Slavic; South Slavic; Transitional; Torlakian; Gorani

Official status
- Recognised minority language in: Kosovo

Language codes
- ISO 639-3: –
- Glottolog: None
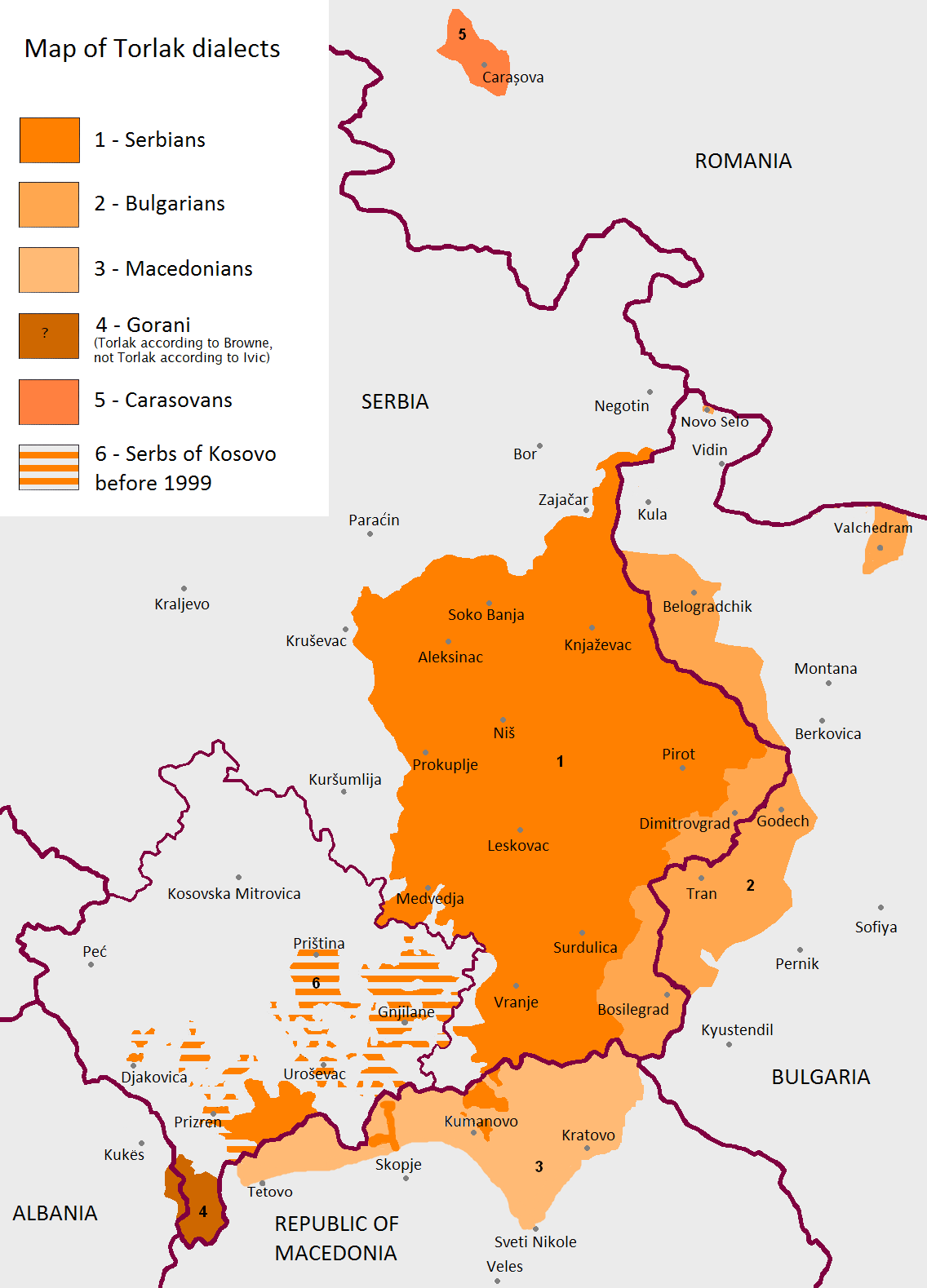
- Area where Torlakian dialects are spoken. Number 4 (in southern Kosovo) indicates the Gora dialect area.

Gorani, Goranski or Našinski ('Our language') is a South Slavic regiolect spoken by the Gorani people in the border area between Kosovo, North Macedonia, and Albania. It is part of the Torlak dialect group, which is transitional between Eastern and Western South Slavic languages.

== Distribution and classification ==
Spoken across the Gora region in 19 villages in Kosovo, 11 in Albania, and two in North Macedonia. In Kosovo and North Macedonia, it is sometimes written in either the Serbian or Macedonian Cyrillic Alphabets, whereas in Albania, the Latin Albanian alphabet is used. In the 1991 Yugoslav census, 54.8% of the inhabitants of the Gora Municipality said that they spoke the Gorani language, roughly in proportion to the number who considered themselves ethnic Gorani. In the same census, a little less than half of the inhabitants of Gora considered their language Serbian.

Related to the neighbouring Torlakian dialect varieties spoken in the Prizren–South Morava area to the northeast, also spoken in the southern half of Kosovo and in southeastern Serbia, as well as to the northernmost dialects of North Macedonia. In relation to Macedonian dialectology, it is described as having particular close links to the Tetovo dialect of the Polog and Tetovo regions, which are situated just opposite the Gora area on the other side of the Šar Mountains.

Gorani has also been classified as a part of the Bulgarian dialect area, by Bulgarian as well as some foreign anthropologists. In 2007, the Bulgarian Academy of Sciences sponsored and printed the first Gorani–Albanian dictionary (with 43,000 words and phrases) by Goranian researcher Nazif Dokle, who considers the language a Bulgarian dialect.

On the other hand, former Yugoslav linguists Vidoeski, Brozović and Ivić identify the Slavic dialect of the Gora region as Macedonian. According to some sources, in 2003, the Kosovo government acquired Macedonian language and grammar books to be taught in Gorani schools.

== Phonology ==
=== Phonological characteristics ===
Gorani shares with standard Serbian, the northernmost dialects of Macedonian, and western dialects of Bulgarian, the vocalisation of earlier syllabic /l/ in words like vuk ('wolf'; cf. Macedonian volk, standard Bulgarian vǎlk). With Serbian it also shares the reflex of */tj, dj/ as /tɕ, dʑ/, as opposed to standard Macedonian /c, ɟ/ (⟨ќ⟩, ⟨ѓ⟩). With the westernmost Macedonian varieties, as well as most of the Bulgarian varieties, it shares the reflex of "big Yus" (*/ɔ̃/) as /ə/ (ǎ) in words like pǎt ('road') (cf. Macedonian pat, Serbian put). With standard Macedonian and some Bulgarian dialects it shares the reflexes of */ĭ, ŭ/ as /e, o/ in words like den ('day') and son ('dream'). With standard Macedonian, standard Serbian and some Bulgarian dialects it shares the retention of syllabic /r/ in words like krv ('blood').

=== Consonants ===
		Labial	Dental/ alveolar	Retroflex	(Alveolo-) palatal	Velar
Nasal		m	n		ɲ	
Plosive	voiceless	p	t			k
Plosive	voiced	b	d			ɡ
Affricate	voiceless		t͡s	t͡ʂ	t͡ɕ	
Affricate	voiced		d͡z	d͡ʐ	d͡ʑ	
Fricative	voiceless	f	s	ʂ		x
Fricative	voiced		z	ʐ		
Approximant	median	ʋ			j	
Approximant	lateral		l		ʎ	
Trill			r			

- /ʋ/ may also be heard as a semivowel [w].

=== Vowels ===
	Front	Central	Back
Close	i		u
Mid	e	ə	o
Open		a	

- Nasalized mid-vowels /ẽ, õ/ may also occur among different village dialects.

== Grammar ==
Morphology

The dialect makes a distinction between three genders (masculine, feminine and neuter), seven cases (nominative, genitive, dative, accusative, vocative, locative, instrumental) and two numbers (singular and plural).

Grammar

Nouns have three grammatical genders (masculine, feminine and neuter) that correspond, to a certain extent, with the word ending so most nouns with -a are feminine, -o and -e neuter, and the rest mostly masculine but with some feminine. The grammatical gender of a noun affects the morphology of other parts of speech (adjectives, pronouns, and verbs) attached to it. Nouns are declined into seven cases: nominative, genitive, dative, accusative, vocative, locative, and instrumental.

Nominative: Dōmà ni je ubava. Our house is good. Šo?

Genitive: Dǒmà ni je ubava. Our house is good. Koj?

Dative: Dǒmī´je ubavo. The house is fine. Komu?

Accusative: Nacrtau negua Dōmā. He drew his house. Kogo?

Vocative: Dómā, ni trebe! We need a house!

Instrumental: Ja živuem so dǒmā. I live with a house. So šo?

Locative: Ja som (vo) Dōmá. I am at the house. Če de?

	Singular			Plural		
Nominative	dōmà, masc. (home, house)	sēlò, neutr. (village)	rānā, fem. (wound)	dōmē	sēlá	rāně
Genitive	dǒmà	sélō	ránā	dōmě	sélā	ránē
Dative	dǒmī	sēlū	rānī	dōmévém	sélātàm	rānǐj
Accusative	dōmā	sēló	rǎnā	dōmēvé	sělā	rāném
Vocative	dómā	sělō, sélōū	ránō, ráná	dómēvē	sélātá	rāné
Instrumental	dǒmā	sēlǒ	rǎnǎ	dōmēvē	sēlà	rǎnē
Locative	dōmá	sēlò	rānà	dǒmēvē	sēlā	rāně
