= Political views on the Macedonian language =

The existence and distinctiveness of the Macedonian language is disputed in Bulgaria and the name of the language was disputed by Greece. By signing the Prespa Agreement, Greece accepted the name "Macedonian language" in reference to the official language of North Macedonia. Macedonian dialects form a continuum with Bulgarian dialects as part of the Eastern South Slavic sub-group; they in turn form a broader continuum with Serbo-Croatian through the transitional Torlakian dialects. Throughout history, Macedonian has been referred to as a variant of Bulgarian. It was standardized in Yugoslavia in 1945 based on the central-western dialects of the region of Macedonia. Macedonian was recognized as a minority language in Bulgaria from 1946 to 1948. Though, it was subsequently described in Bulgaria again as a dialect or regional norm of Bulgarian.

Although Bulgaria was the first country to recognize the independence of the Republic of Macedonia in 1991, most of its academics, as well as the general public, continue to regard the language spoken there as a form of Bulgarian. However, after years of diplomatic impasse caused by this academic dispute, in 1999, the language issue was settled between the Bulgarian and Macedonian government with a Joint Declaration which used the formulation: in Macedonian, pursuant to Constitution of the Republic of Macedonia, and in Bulgarian, pursuant the Constitution of the Republic of Bulgaria. Nevertheless, the Bulgarian government and academia continue to deny Macedonian as a separate language. This issue was one of the main reasons for which the Bulgarian government has hindered accession of North Macedonia to the European Union.

== Historical overview ==
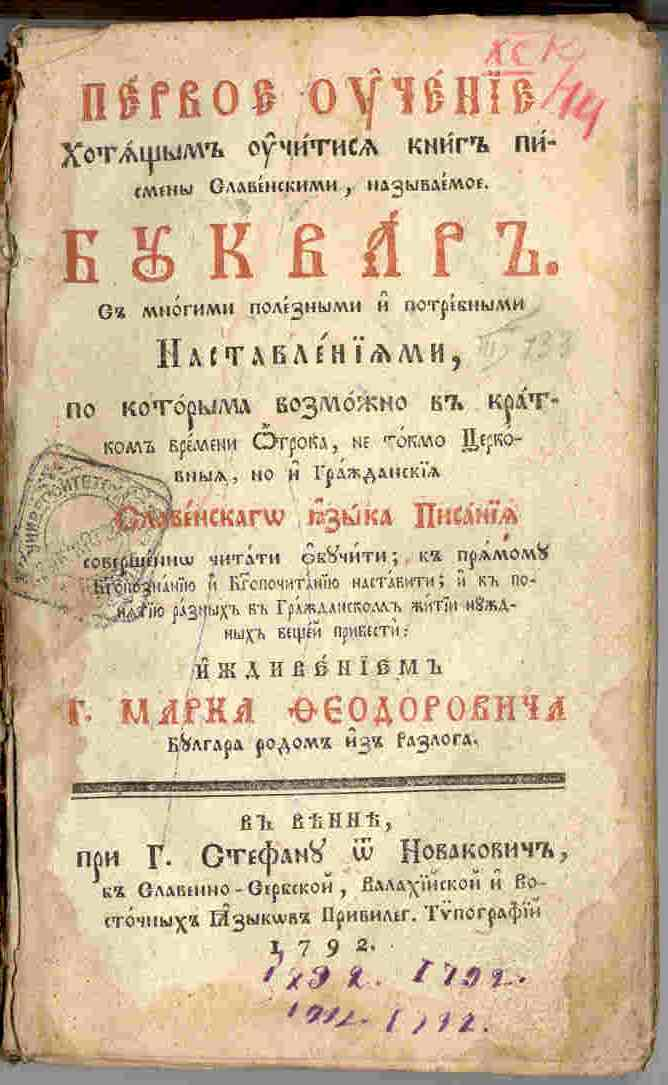
Marko Teodorrovich's Primer, 1792

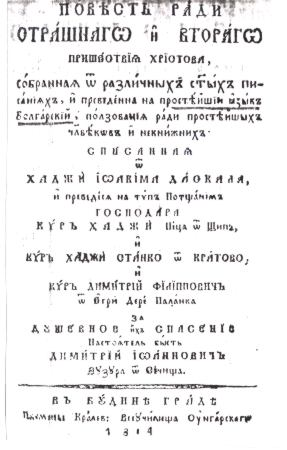
Ioakim Karchovski's vernacular book, 1814

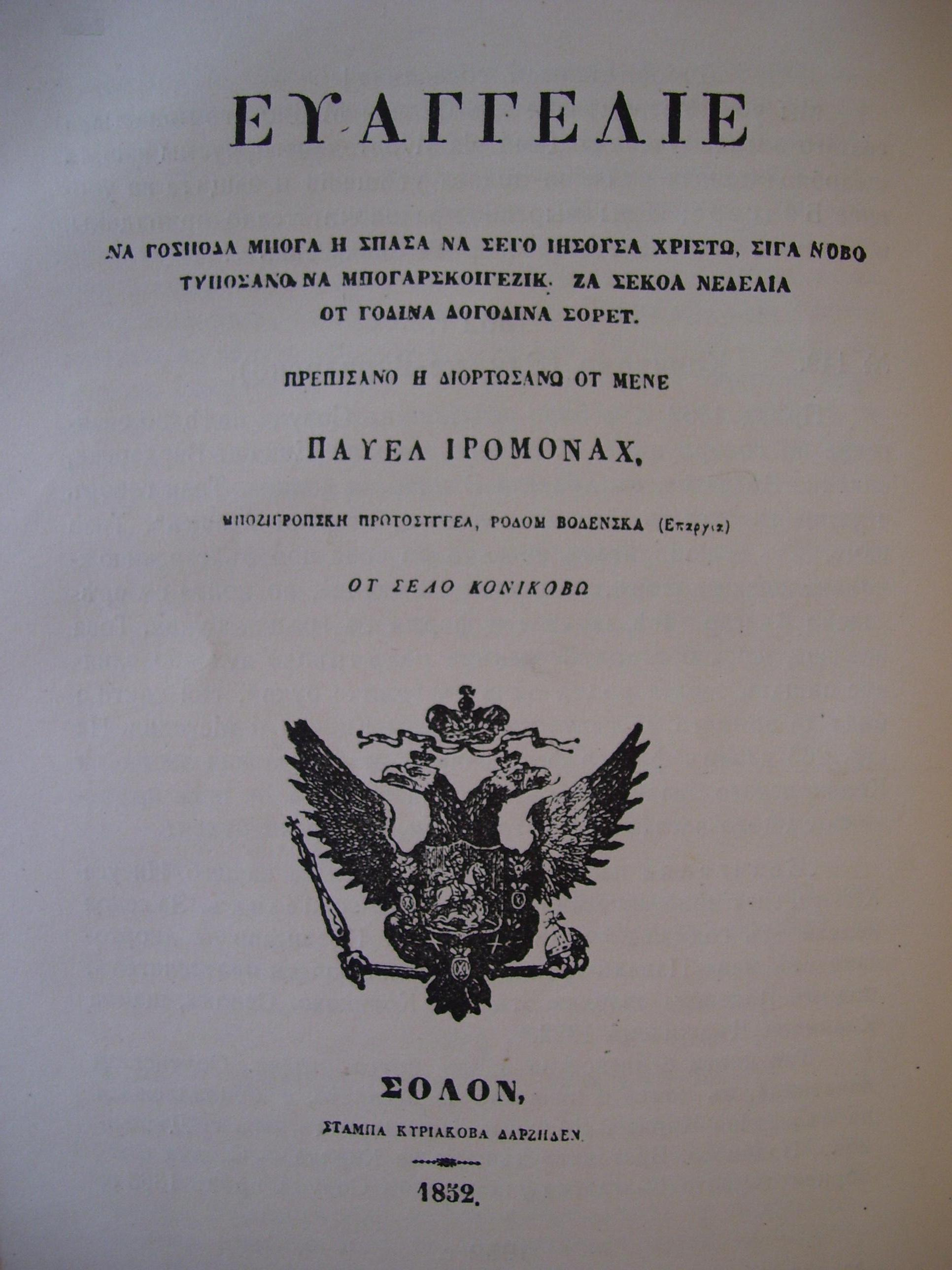
Konikovo Gospel, 1852

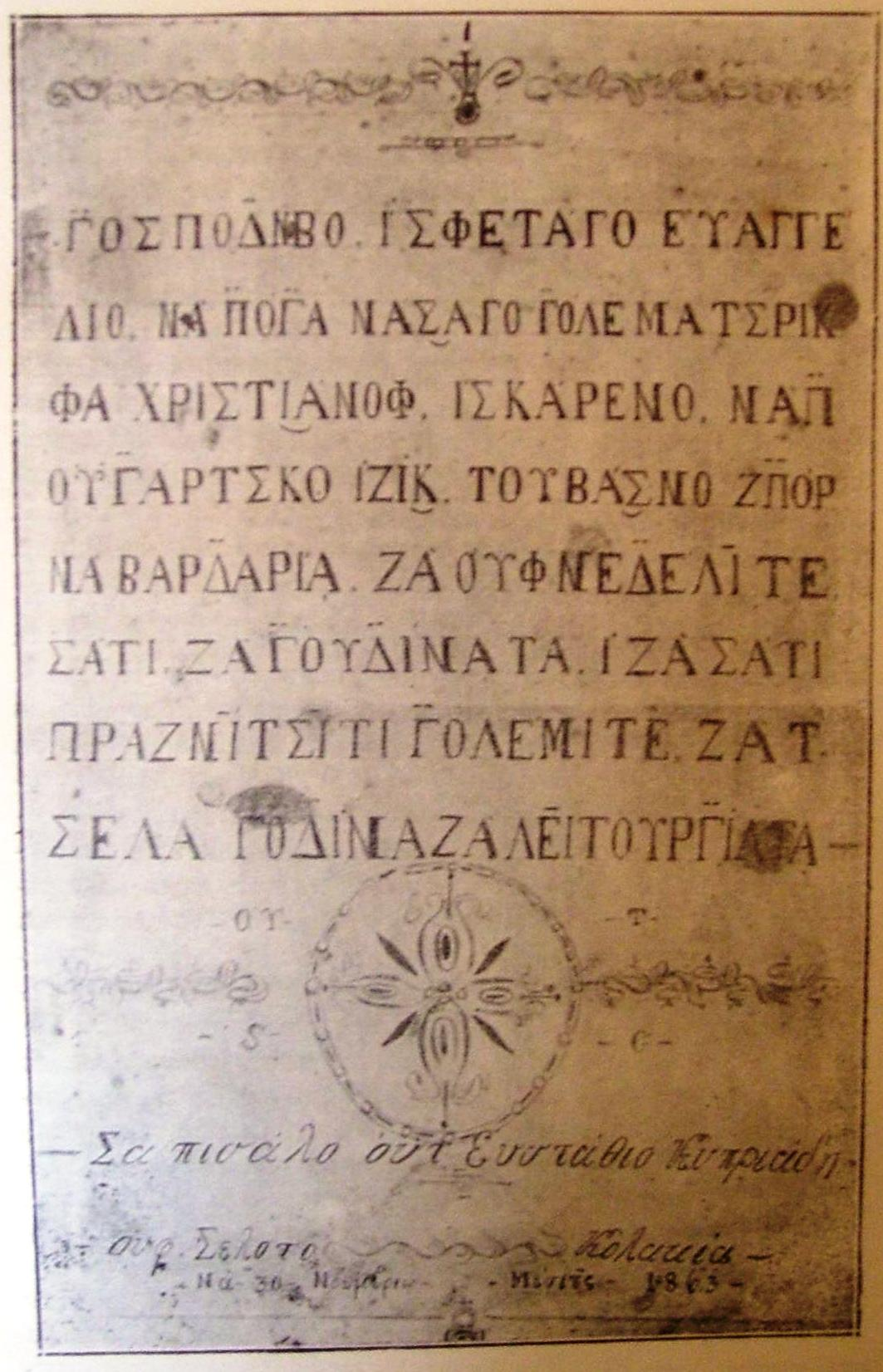
Kulakia Gospel, 1863

Yoakim Karchovski and Kiril Peychinovich, who wrote in Macedonian dialects, called their language "Bulgarian". Bosnian folklorist Stefan Verković wrote in the preface of the 1860 collection Folk Songs of the Macedonian Bulgarians: "I named these songs Bulgarian, and not Slavic because today when you ask any Macedonian Slav: Who are you? He immediately answers: I am Bulgarian and call my language Bulgarian…" When the Bulgarian national movement got underway in the second quarter of the 19th century, some cities in Macedonia were among the first to demand education in Bulgarian and Bulgarian-speaking clerics for their churches. By the 1860s, however, it was clear that the Central Balkan regions of Bulgaria were assuming leadership in linguistic and literary affairs. This was to a large extent due to the fact that the wealthy towns on both sides of the Central Balkan range were able to produce more intellectuals educated in Europe than the other Bulgarian regions, which were relatively less developed. Consequently, when the idea that the vernacular rather than Church Slavonic should be represented in the written language gained preponderance, it was the dialects of the Central Balkan region between Veliko Tarnovo and Plovdiv that were most represented. From 1860, during the Bulgarian Revival, there was a question on which dialects should literary Bulgarian be based. Some Bulgarian educators from Macedonia like Parteniy Zografski and Kuzman Shapkarev called for a stronger representation of Macedonian dialects in the Bulgarian language but their advice was not heeded at the time. Zografski wrote that there were two main dialects of Bulgarian, the one spoken in Bulgaria and Thrace, and the one spoken in Macedonia, and he suggested the second as the basis of literary Bulgarian. However, the dominant view was to use the eastern dialects as the basis of literary Bulgarian. Shapkarev wrote textbooks in the western dialects and criticized the supremacy of the eastern dialects, which he claimed as incomprehensible in Macedonia. In his Great Bulgarian Textbook from 1868, he expressed his intention to write in a language which his compatriots, the Macedonian Bulgarians, could understand. The Bulgarian press condemned his views, accusing him of advocating the existence of a distinct Macedonian language and a distinct history of Macedonian people. When the teacher and Uniate priest Veniamin Machukovski wanted to write a "Bulgarian grammar according to the Macedonian idiom", the Bulgarian press criticized him too. Natives of central and eastern Bulgaria often did not regard Macedonian dialects as "proper Bulgarian", perceiving the Macedonian vernacular as being corrupted by Albanian, Aromanian, Greek or Serbian influence. Zografski's language was referred to as a "mixture of Bulgarian and Serbian". Per political scientist Alexis Heraclides, Macedonian Slavs did not want to create a separate language from Bulgarian because they "did not have a clearly defined national or territorial consciousness or a sense of belonging". According to historian Tchavdar Marinov, it is not realistic to interpret the linguistic debates between authors from Bulgaria and Macedonia from the 1860s and 1870s as a conflict between two national sides. Macedonian Bulgarian writers did not regard the Macedonian vernacular as different from the Bulgarian language or wanted to codify a separate literary norm. The primary issue was the basis for the literary Bulgarian language. In 1870, philologist Marin Drinov rejected the proposal for a mixed eastern/western Bulgarian/Macedonian basis of the Bulgarian standard language. Per Marinov, the adoption of the eastern Bulgarian dialects as the basis of literary Bulgarian "was largely decisive for the development of a separate Macedonian norm".

In 1890, Austrian linguist Karl Hron, in his book The nationality of the Macedonian Slavs, expressed the opinion that the Macedonians "are a separate nation by its history as well as by its language". This view was also held by linguists Petar Draganov, Leonhard Masing, Pyοtr Lavrov and Jan Baudouin de Courtenay. In the late 19th century, the Russian Empire was trying to find a balance between Bulgarian and Serbian influence in Macedonia, and accepted the idea that the local Slavs were neither Serbs, nor Bulgarians. Among international ethnologists and linguists, there were two views from the last decades of the 19th century until the eve of World War II: Macedonian is a dialect of Bulgarian or Macedonian is an in-between language, between Bulgarian and Serbian, closer to Bulgarian. The first view prevailed until the beginning of the 20th century, among linguists, ethnographers, geographers, historians and diplomats who had served in Ottoman Macedonia. Such people include Gustav Weigand, André Mazon, Arnold Toynbee, H. N. Brailsford, and Arthur Evans. Macedonian linguistic separatism emerged in the late 19th century. In 1902, the Austrian-Hungarian consul in Bitola (Manastir) suggested the publication of primers in the Macedonian language. In the late 1920s, French linguists André Meillet and André Vaillant recognized Macedonian as a distinct language. After visiting the Macedonian region, Polish linguist Mieczysław Małecki asserted that Macedonian was a mixture of Bulgarian and Serbian, and thus a distinct language. In the 1930s, Russian and Soviet Slavic studies recognized the existence of a separate Macedonian language and ethnicity. From the 1930s, the Bulgarian Communist Party (BCP) and the Comintern sought to foster a separate Macedonian nationality and language as a means of achieving autonomy for Macedonia within a Balkan federation. Consequently, it was Bulgarian-educated Macedonians who were the first to work on developing a literary Macedonian language, culture and literature. On 2 August 1944, the Anti-fascist Assembly for the National Liberation of Macedonia declared Macedonian as the official language of the declared Macedonian state within Yugoslavia. When Socialist Macedonia was formed as part of Federal Yugoslavia, Bulgarian-trained cadres got into a conflict over the language with the more Serbian-leaning activists, who had been working within the Yugoslav Communist Party. Since the latter held most of the political power, they managed to impose their views on the direction the new language was to follow, much to the dismay of the former group.

After 1944 the communist-dominated government sought to create a Bulgarian-Yugoslav Balkan Communist Federation and part of this entailed giving "cultural autonomy" to the Pirin region. Consequently, Bulgarian communists recognized Macedonian as distinct from Bulgarian. After the Tito–Stalin split in 1948, those plans were abandoned. This date also coincided with the first claims of Bulgarian linguists as to the Serbianization of Macedonian. Bulgaria continued to support the idea of a Macedonian unification and a Macedonian nation but within the framework of a Balkan Federation and not within Yugoslavia. However, a reversal in the Macedonization policy was already announced in the secret April plenum of the BCP in 1956 and openly proclaimed in the plenum of 1963. 1958 was the first time that a "serious challenge" to the Macedonian position was launched by Bulgaria. The national belonging of the Macedonian dialects was disputed between Bulgarian scholars and Yugoslav Macedonian scholars. The Macedonian language was taught in departments of Slavic studies in Western Europe, Eastern Europe and United States. Throughout history, Macedonian has been referred to as a variant of Bulgarian, Serbian or a distinct language of its own. The international consensus is that Macedonian is an autonomous language within the Eastern South Slavic dialect continuum. The language is recognized by 138 member states of the United Nations.

== Macedonian views ==
The Macedonian view is that Macedonian is the first written Slavic language in the world. In an attempt to prove the historical continuity of the language, Macedonian scholars view Old Church Slavonic as Macedonian. In the 1980s and 1990s, anti-Yugoslav Macedonian nationalists accused Blaže Koneski and the communist elite of Serbianizing the Macedonian standard language. In turn, they were accused of Bulgarophilia and Serbophobia. Per Macedonian revisionist historian Stojan Kiselinovski, Koneski brought Macedonian orthography closer to Serbo-Croatian. Kiselinovski was accused of being a pro-Bulgarian and having acted on the orders of VMRO-DPMNE by the Macedonian media for stating that Koneski advocated for the adoption of the Serbian Cyrillic alphabet, which is substantiated in documentation. Macedonian foreign minister Nikola Dimitrov rejected the Bulgarian claims on language as having no basis on international law with Macedonian as a well-established language.

== Bulgarian views ==
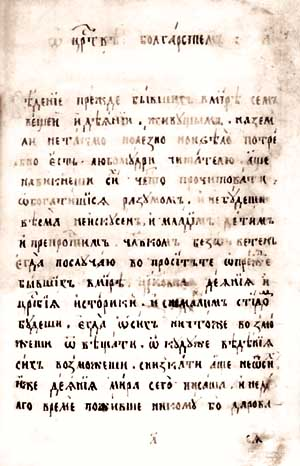
A page from Slavonic-Bulgarian History, written in 1762 by Macedonia-born Saint Paisius of Hilendar.

From January 1945, the regional newspaper Pirinsko Delo printed in Bulgaria, published a page in Macedonian, where Blaže Koneski explained the principles of the Macedonian standard language. In 1946, Elections for a constituent assembly in October gave the communists a majority. In line with Bulgaria's new official recognition of ethnic Macedonians in Pirin Macedonia, Bulgarian linguists were obligated to agree that there was a historical difference between Bulgarian and Macedonian. However, some linguists such as Ivan Lekov held traditional views, writing that the Macedonian dialects were regarded as "Macedono-Bulgarian" by international Slavists too. BCP advocated for the creation of a South Slavic federation between Bulgaria and Yugoslavia, and a goal was the unification of geographic Macedonia.

While the existence of Macedonian was recognized in 1946/1947 and allowed as the language of instruction in schools in Pirin Macedonia, the period after the Tito-Stalin split in 1948 saw its rejection. In 1948, two forums of the Central Committee (CC) of the BCP in the Sixteenth Plenum and the Fifth Congress condemned the "Serbified language" of SR Macedonia. Koneski reacted against Bulgarian accusations, seeing them as an attack on the Macedonian national identity. Although they stopped education in Macedonian inside the country, the Bulgarian Communist Party and state initially continued to recognize a distinct Macedonian identity. From 1948 to 1963, some Bulgarian linguists still continued to recognize Macedonian as a separate Slavic language. In 1952, Bulgarian linguist Kiril Mirchev, who was asked to join the commission on the codification of Macedonian in 1944 but declined, wrote a paper titled "On the Macedonian Literary Language" in which he tried to prove that Macedonian was a branch of Bulgarian. However, he affirmed the need for a Macedonian standard norm and made the accusation that it was Serbianized. Koneski countered the accusation with an essay. The first edition of Stoyko Stoykov's Bulgarian Dialectology in 1949 regarded the Macedonian dialects as separate but mentioned that there was a strong connection between the Macedonian and Bulgarian dialects. The second edition of Bulgarian Dialectology in 1956 talked about twelve centuries of Macedonian dialects as part of the Bulgarian nation before becoming standardized. In 1956, the Bulgarian government signed an agreement with Yugoslavia for mutual legal defense, where Macedonian is named along with Bulgarian, Serbo-Croatian, and Slovene as one of the languages to be used officially for legal matters. In the same year, Bulgaria revoked its recognition of Macedonian nationhood and language, and resumed its prewar position.

The 1963 edition of Bulgarian Dialectology claimed all of the Macedonian dialects as part of the Bulgarian language. However, Stoykov accepted that the Macedonians had the right to have their own nation and national language. In that period, linguists in the Institute of Bulgarian Language of the Bulgarian Academy of Sciences referred to "Bulgaro-Macedonian dialects", but this terminology was abandoned. In March 1963, Todor Zhivkov in a plenum of the party leadership, stated that the Macedonian language was an "idiom belonging to our western idioms, a dialect". The first big "language scandal" between Bulgaria and Macedonia happened in November 1966 when the president of the Bulgarian Association of Writers and Zhivkov's personal advisor, Georgi Dzagarov, refused to sign an agreement for friendship and cooperation that was prepared in both Bulgarian and Macedonian. From that moment, Bulgarian official representatives systematically refused to sign any documents also written in Macedonian. The 1968 edition of Bulgarian Dialectology claimed that the Macedonian dialects were unable to develop into a separate language.

In 1968, the Short Comparative Historical and Typological Grammar of the Slavic Languages was published by Lekov. On the same day it appeared in bookstores, the book was confiscated and withdrawn from circulation by the authorities. In his comparison of the phonological, and morphological traits of Slavic languages in their historical development, Lekov included the Macedonian language, referring to the "new Macedonian language" and "the newfangled Macedonian literary language". He depicted the historical evolutions of "Bulgarian with Macedonian" and used the term "Bulgaro-Macedonian" for the vernacular varieties. As a result, the Presidium of the Bulgarian Academy of Sciences (BAN) criticized Lekov for "unpatriotic behavior" and he was later omitted from the leadership of the International Committee of Slavists, where he was the vice president, which was done on the initiative of the Bulgarian delegation. Maksim Mladenov, dialectologist from the Institute of Bulgarian Language, rejected the concept of a "Bulgaro-Macedonian" dialectal continuum, stating that the language community of Macedonia and Bulgaria could only be Bulgarian.

Bulgarian linguists denounced Blaže Koneski's claim that the Macedonian language had been developing separately from the era of Cyril and Methodius and their followers. Bulgarian scholars criticized the dialectological maps of Božidar Vidoeski for claiming the Pirin region as well. In 1969, the resolution of the Politburo of CC of BCP on the development of Bulgarian studies abroad, seeking to spread the "historical truth" about Macedonia and countering Yugoslavia's "falsification" of the history of the Bulgarian language, was issued. The resolution led to the creation of the Center for Bulgarian Studies in BAN, to coordinate historical, linguistic, literary, ethnographic and folkloristic research and to release data outside the country. Following the resolution, the Institute of Bulgarian Language did not comply with political boundaries when depicting dialects in the volume of the Bulgarian Dialectological Atlas. As a result, geographic Macedonia and southeastern Serbia were part of it. An atlas of the "Bulgarian dialects" in Greek Macedonia was published in 1972. In the 1970s, Bulgarian dialectologists greatly expanded the Bulgarian linguistic area. In 1977, a resolution of the Politburo of the CC of BCP on the development of Bulgarian studies targeted the Macedonian studies that were successful in international universities and academies. Since 1977, a Summer Seminar in Bulgarian Language, held in Veliko Tarnovo, wanted to counter the influence over international Slavic studies by the Seminar on Macedonian Language in Ohrid. In 1978, the Institute of Bulgarian Language published the pamphlet The Unity of the Bulgarian Language in the Past and Today, where the Macedonian language was defined as a "regional written norm of the Bulgarian language". In 1978, Macedonian linguists responded to the Bulgarian Academy's pamphlet with a rival work in an attempt to prove the historical continuity and legitimacy of the Macedonian language. In the 1970s and 1980s, "Macedonian dialects" disappeared from the terminology used by Bulgarian academia.

In 1982, the Institute of Bulgarian Language refused to participate in two projects: the Pan-Slavic Linguistic Atlas and the Pan-Carpathian Dialectal Atlas. Bulgarian scholars could not work on alongside Yugoslav specialists like Božidar Vidoeski and Pavle Ivić as they would have had to accept their colleagues' recognition of a separate Macedonian language and dialects. Seeking to gain legitimacy for their point of view on Macedonian identity and language, the leaders of the Bulgarian Communist Party and state, as well as BAN, spread pro-Bulgarian propaganda in international academic circles. Bulgarian linguists also tried to convince international linguists to support their view, but did not have much success internationally. In 1983, the Institute of Bulgarian Language was advised by the party and state leadership, to oppose "every attempt to falsify the truth about the Bulgarian people [and] the unity of its language". In the mid-1980s, Konstantin Popov, a scholar from Sofia University, dismissed the Macedonian standard language as a "provincial jargon".

Venko Markovski, writer, poet and Communist politician from the region of Macedonia, who in 1945 participated in the Commission for the Creation of the Macedonian Alphabet and once wrote in Macedonian and published what was the first contemporary book written in standardized Macedonian, in an interview for Bulgarian National Television prior to his death, stated that ethnic Macedonians and the Macedonian language do not exist and that they were a result of Comintern manipulation. Although Bulgaria was the first country to recognize the independence of the Republic of Macedonia, most of its academics, as well as the general public, regard the language spoken there as a form of Bulgarian. Bulgarian president Zhelyu Zhelev stated that Bulgaria recognized Republic of Macedonia only as a political entity and would never recognize a Macedonian nation or language. From 1991, Bulgarian officials, academics and Bulgarian mass media, have repeatedly claimed that the Macedonian nation and Macedonian language are arbitrary constructions, artificially created by Josip Broz Tito, to keep Vardar Macedonia and not allow unification with Bulgaria. In April 1994, during an official visit in Skopje, the Bulgarian minister of education refused to sign a bilateral agreement written "in the Bulgarian language and the Macedonian language". Bulgarian representatives rejected such a formula and suggested instead the formula "official languages of the two countries." Macedonian officials refused to accept the formula. As a result of the language dispute between Bulgarian and Macedonian politicians, scholars and media, by the late 1990s more than twenty bilateral contracts were unsigned. On 22 February 1999, the Macedonian government led by Ljubčo Georgievski and the Bulgarian government led by Ivan Kostov signed the Joint Declaration in the official languages of the two countries, solving the problem with the formula: "the official language of the country (Republic of Macedonia) in accordance with its constitution". With the formula, Bulgaria recognized Macedonian as a legal term and not as an "objective reality". It marked the first time Bulgaria agreed to sign a bilateral agreement written in Macedonian in the post-communist period.

Bulgarian scholars also claim that the overwhelming majority of the Macedonian population had no consciousness of a Macedonian language separate from Bulgarian prior to 1945. The Bulgarian view is that just like the nation, the Macedonian language is "artificial" and created by political dictate and it is a Bulgarian dialect, revised by a politically motivated Serbianization. Bulgarians view standard Macedonian as heavily Serbianized, especially with regards to its vocabulary. Bulgarian scholar Kosta Tsarnushanov claimed there are several ways in which standard Macedonian was Serbianized, such as Insertion of Serbian words into the dictionary, creation of Serbisms, adoption of Serbian words and expressions, etc. Bulgarian linguists assert that the Macedonian and Yugoslav linguists who were involved in codifying the new language artificially introduced differences from literary Bulgarian to bring it closer to Serbian. Macedonian is not taught in any educational institution in Bulgaria. Macedonian is still widely regarded as a dialect by Bulgarian scholars, historians and politicians alike including the Government of Bulgaria and BAN, which deny the existence of a separate Macedonian language and declare it as a written regional form of the Bulgarian language. Similar sentiments are also expressed by the majority of the Bulgarian population. In October 2019, Bulgaria advised the European Union to avoid using the term "Macedonian language" during the accession talks of North Macedonia, and instead use the terminology "Official language of Republic of North Macedonia".

As Bulgarian-Macedonian relations deteriorated from late 2019, despite the Treaty of Friendship in 2017. Bulgarian foreign minister Ekaterina Zaharieva stated that Bulgaria did not recognize "the so-called Macedonian language as separate from Bulgarian", and this is based "on historical facts that are not open to interpretation". In May 2020, BAN published a 68-page book, written by 12 authors, titled On the Official Language of the Republic of North Macedonia, as a response to a declaration by the Macedonian Academy of Sciences and Arts from 3 December 2019 about the Macedonian language. It attempted to prove that Macedonian is a variant of Bulgarian. Bulgarian politician Rumen Radev, who was then serving as president of the country, praised the book at a meeting with the president and vice-president of BAN, Julian Rewalski and Vasil Nikolov (the editor of the book). Macedonian linguists claimed that the book is "flat and tendentious" and distorted the facts about the history of the Macedonian language. Austrian historian Ulf Brunnbauer referred to the publication of the book as a "pseudo-scientific justification" by BAN.

== Greek views ==
The "A Dictionary of Three languages" (1875) - "Slavo-Macedonian" - Albanian - Turkish

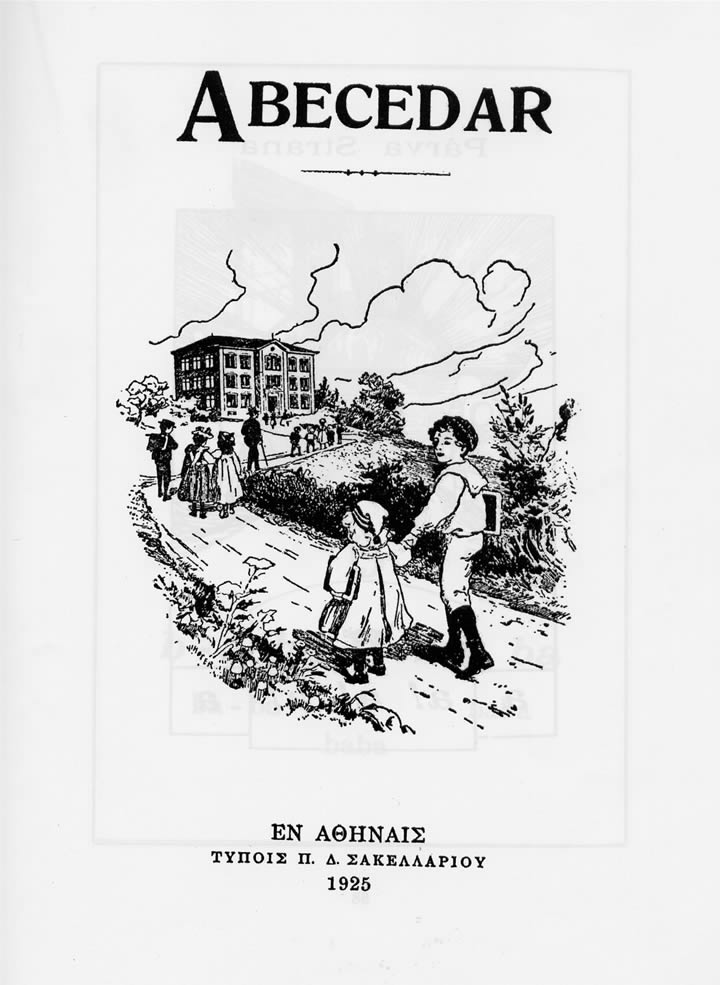
The front page of the Abecedar, a school book published by the Greek government in 1925. Attempts to use Macedonian-language books in the Greek educational system were largely unsuccessful.

In the late 19th and early 20th century, Greeks, such as Konstantinos Tsioulkas, claimed that the Macedonian vernacular was "a corrupted version of ancient Macedonian – in other words, a form of Greek". In the interwar period, Greece regarded "Slav-Macedonian" as a separate Slavic language to avoid any association with Bulgarian and deal with Bulgarian claims. In 1925, a Macedonian primer Abecedar was published in Athens, but was never used and eventually most copies were destroyed.

During the Macedonia naming dispute, the Greek point of view was that there is only one true meaning for the term Macedonia, and that is in reference to ancient Macedon and the modern Greek region of Macedonia. Therefore, Greeks objected to the use of the "Macedonian" name in reference to the modern Slavic language, calling it "Slavomacedonian" (Greek: σλαβομακεδονική γλώσσα), a term coined by some members of the Slavic-speaking community of northern Greece itself and used by Georgi Pulevski in his book "A Dictionary of Three languages". Until 1999, Macedonian had never been recognized as a minority language in Greece, and attempts to have Macedonian-language books introduced in education have failed. Slavist Christina Kramer argues that Greek policies have largely been based on denying connection between the Macedonian codified standard and that of the Slavophone minority in the country and sees it as "clearly directed towards the elimination of Macedonian". There have been attempts to have the language recognized as a minority language in Greece. Demetrius Andreas Floudas, Senior Associate of Hughes Hall, Cambridge, argued that it was only in 1944 that Josip Broz Tito, in order to increase his regional influence, gave to the southernmost province of Yugoslavia (officially known as Vardarska banovina under the banate regional nomenclature) the new name of People's Republic of Macedonia. Per him, at the same time, in a "political master-stroke", the local language - which was until then held to be a western Bulgarian dialect - was unilaterally named "Macedonian" and became one of Yugoslavia's official languages. Books have been published in Greece which purport to expose the alleged artificial character of Macedonian. From 1945 until the Prespa agreement in 2018, the dominant view in Greece was that Macedonian is a Bulgarian dialect.

On 3 June 2018, the Greek Minister of Shipping and Island Policy Panagiotis Kouroublis, acknowledged that Greece had fully recognized the term "Macedonian language" for the modern Slavic language, since the 1977 UN Conference on the Standardization of Geographical Names, a fact confirmed on 6 June by the Greek Foreign Minister Nikos Kotzias, who stated that the language was recognized by the New Democracy-led government of that time. Kotzias also revealed classified documents confirming the use of the term "Macedonian Language" by the past governments of Greece, as well as pointing out to official statements of the Greek Prime Minister Evangelos Averoff who in 1954 and 1959 used the term "Macedonian language" to refer to the South Slavic language. New Democracy denied these claims, noting that the 1977 UN document states clearly that the terminology used thereof (i.e. the characterization of the languages) does not imply any opinion of the General Secretariat of the UN regarding the legal status of any country, territory, borders etc. Further, New Democracy stated that in 2007 and 2012, as governing party, included Greece's objections in the relevant UN documents. Slavic speakers of Greek Macedonia have variously referred to their language as makedonski, makedoniski ("Macedonian"), slaviká (Greek: σλαβικά, "Slavic"), dópia or entópia (Greek: εντόπια, "local/indigenous [language]"), balgàrtzki (Bulgarian) or "Macedonian" in some parts of the region of Kastoria, bògartski ("Bulgarian") in some parts of Dolna Prespa along with naši ("our own") and stariski ("old"). With the Prespa agreement, Greece accepted the use of the adjective "Macedonian" to refer to the language using a footnote to describe it as Slavic.

== Serbian views ==
In the interwar period, Macedonian was treated as a South Serbian dialect in Yugoslavia. The government permitted its use in dialectal literature. Until the Yugoslav communist period, Serbian scholars, including Spiridon Gopčević (who was an astronomer) and Aleksandar Belić, claimed that the Macedonian dialects were closer to Serbian. Belić, who had labeled Old Štokavian as "Serbo-Macedonian", had to give up his claims on Macedonian. In Serbia, Macedonian is recognized as a minority language.

== International academic views ==
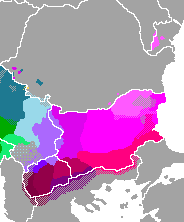
The Eastern South Slavic dialectal area. Torlakian dialects Northern Macedonian dialects Western Macedonian Central Macedonian Southeastern Macedonian dialects Southwestern Bulgarian dialects (or Eastern Macedonian dialects) Northwestern Bulgarian dialects Rup dialects Balkan dialects Moesian dialects Standard Bulgarian is based on the Rup, Balkan and Moesian ("Eastern Bulgarian") dialects. Standard Macedonian is based on the Western Macedonian dialects, consisting of the 'Western' and 'Central Macedonian' subgroups.

French linguist Andrè Meillet argued in 1928 that politics would decide the fate of the Macedonian vernacular, but also argued that it was neither Bulgarian or Serbian, and that literary Bulgarian was very distant from the Macedonian dialects. In 1938, in his comparative grammar of the Slavic languages, French linguist André Vaillant claimed that a quasi-literary Macedonian language existed from the late 19th century, and that Macedonian is not simply a dialect of Bulgarian, being influenced by Serbian, as well as by non-Slavic languages. He concluded that there was a separate "Macedono-Bulgarian group". With the establishment of standard Macedonian from 1945, the international consensus among linguists is that it is a separate language. In his work Outline of a Comparative Grammar of the Slavic Languages, published after the codification of Macedonian, Samuil Bernstein stated that the Bulgarian and Macedonian dialects were part of the same language in the past, while the Macedonian language has the same status as the other Slavic languages. He also opined:

"… [a]ppearance of national languages is determined, first of all, by historical conditions, but not by dialectal closeness or distance … In many respects, the Macedonian dialects are closer to the West Bulgarian dialects than the Rhodope dialects. However, at the present time, the Macedonian dialects belong to the Macedonian national language, while the Rhodope dialects are dialects of the Bulgarian language."

Linguists, such as Horace Lunt and Victor Friedman, rejected the claim that Macedonian was created on the basis of a Titoist dictate. Italian linguist Vittore Pisani stated "the Macedonian language is actually an artifact produced for primarily political reasons". German linguist Friedrich Scholz argued that the Macedonian national consciousness and from that conscientious promotion of Macedonian as a written language first appears just in the beginning of the twentieth century and is strengthened particularly during the years between the two world wars. Lunt wrote: "Bulgarian scholars, who argue that the concept of a Macedonian language was unknown before World War II, or who continue to claim that a Macedonian language does not exist look not only dishonest, but silly, while Greek scholars who make similar claims are displaying arrogant ignorance of their Slavic neighbours". He also wrote:

"The differences between Macedonian and the spoken Bulgarian of Sofia are by no means so great. Perhaps the most significant is the accent. Western Macedonian usually has a weak stress accent bound to the antepenult (the penult in some dialects). Bulgarian has a strong expiratory accent accompanied by significant qualitative differences between stressed and unstressed vowels . . . moreover the stress may fall on any syllable, and in many morphemes and morphological categories it shifts about in a complicated manner. This makes the overall acoustic effect of Bulgarian quite different from Macedonian".

Lunt also argued that if Macedonians were to accept the use of standard Bulgarian, it would have demanded "far fewer concessions on their part than have been made by Bavarians and Hamburgers, by Neapolitans and Piedmontese, and even, within Yugoslavia, by natives of Niš in the southeast and Senj in the northwest". In his theory of abstand and ausbau languages, linguist Heinz Kloss regarded "Macedonian and Bulgarian as two standard norms that—in their "pre-literary" stage—could be categorized as a single language". The main supporter of the Bulgarian position by the end of the communist period, Austrian linguist Otto Kronsteiner, stated that the Macedonian linguists artificially introduced differences from the literary Bulgarian language to bring Macedonian closer to Serbian, claiming that the Macedonian language is a Bulgarian one, but written on a Serbian typewriter. Per Marinov, Kronsteiner's public adoption of the Bulgarian nationalist cause only compromised him in front of his Austrian and Western European colleagues. According to the Encyclopedia of Language and Linguistics (ed. linguist Ronald E. Asher), Macedonian can be called a Bulgarian dialect, as structurally it is most similar to Bulgarian. American historian Dennis P. Hupchick wrote that "the obviously plagiarized historical argument of the Macedonian nationalists for a separate Macedonian ethnicity could be supported only by linguistic reality, and that worked against them until the 1940s. Until a modern Macedonian literary language was mandated by the socialist-led partisan movement from Macedonia in 1944, most outside observers and linguists agreed with the Bulgarians in considering the vernacular spoken by the Macedonian Slavs as a western dialect of Bulgarian". According to French linguist Claude Hagège: "Macedonian is certainly closer to Bulgarian than to Serbo-Croatian, but it is distinct from both of them." In 2005, the second edition of a French encyclopedia stated: "Bulgarian, the official language of Bulgaria, is spoken by 9 million people. It includes a dialectal version, Macedonian, the language of the Republic of Macedonia, which is spoken by almost 2 million people." Other French linguists, such as Daniel Baggioni, claimed that ". . . the Macedonian dialects, very diverse as they are, belong nevertheless to the Bulgarian-Macedonian dialectal setting, a heritage from a common religious past attested to by linguistic traits that make them clearly different from the Serbo-Croatian idioms." They have also claimed: "Simultaneously with 'Macedonian nationality,' the master from Belgrade decided to promote a standard language based on what, in the local dialects, was the most distant from Bulgarian and on a phonological graphic—just like the Serbian elaborated by Vuk Karadžić, and not on the more 'historical' orthography of Bulgarian. . . ." Anthropologist Loring Danforth stressed that all languages in the standardization process have a certain political and historical context to them and the fact that the Macedonian language had a political context in which it was standardized does not mean it is not a language. Marinov pointed out, "if the long historical continuity of modern Macedonian as a literary language is doubtful, the Bulgarian idea that it appeared out of nowhere – as a result of Tito's political fiat – is just as dubious". Per him:

That political decisions behind the establishment of the contemporary Macedonian norm do not discredit it either. One can find political resolutions and inaugural "congresses" and "commissions" of language codification in a number of national contexts. (Socio)linguists such as Joshua Fishman have researched such aspects in the language planning of Catalan, Belarusian, Ukrainian, Indonesian, Yiddish, Dutch (Flemish), and so on. Phenomena of this kind are to be found in cases of languages whose "legitimacy" is never disputed: Modern Turkish, Polish, even Hebrew. The fact that Macedonian was largely codified by a single individual—Blaže Koneski—is also not unnatural. Koneski had a number of illustrious precursors elsewhere whose activity had clear political stakes, including Vuk Karadžić (for Serbian and Serbo-Croatian), Aasen (New Norwegian or Nynorsk), Ben Yehuda (Modern Hebrew), Atatürk (Modern Turkish) and Aavik (Estonian). What the simplistic conclusions ignore is that every national language is an "artifact," a result of meta-linguistic intervention that separates the "correct" from the "incorrect." It is a social and cultural reality, constructed through projects and actions that are eminently political. While scholars from Sofia insist that the codification of Macedonian was "politically motivated," they do not note that their own idiom was also constructed in a given political context. For Bulgarian, this context was the late Ottoman era and the first decades after the creation of a nation-state in 1878. For Macedonian, this was Yugoslav Macedonia before and after the creation of a "national" republic. Both cases represent language planning: there are no "natural" national languages distinct from the "artificial" ones.

== See also ==
- A language is a dialect with an army and navy
- Accession of North Macedonia to the European Union
- Bulgarian nationalism
- Macedonian nationalism
- Centre for the Macedonian Language in Greece
- Comparison of Serbo-Croatian standard varieties
- Controversy over ethnic and linguistic identity in Moldova
- Controversy over ethnic and linguistic identity in Montenegro
- Declaration on the Common Language
- Declaration on the Name and Status of the Croatian Literary Language
- Digraphia
- Hindi–Urdu controversy
- Latinisation in the Soviet Union
- Pluricentric language
- Yugoslavism
- Spread of the Latin script
