= Abecedar =

School book in Greece

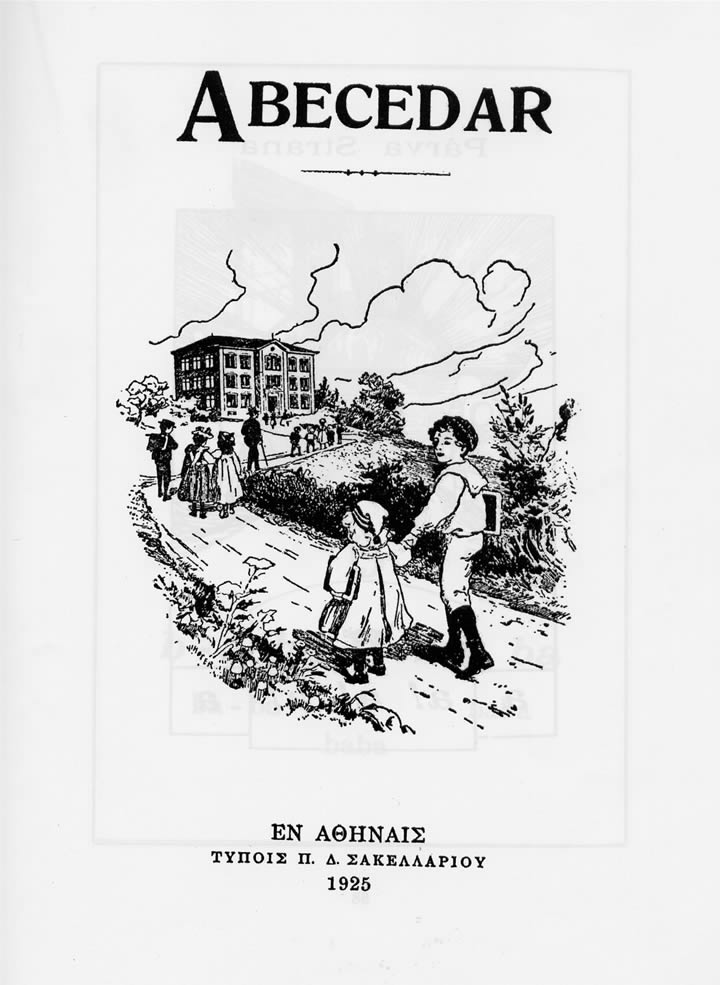
- Front page of the original Abecedar, published in 1925
- Language: Lerin dialect (1925 edition); Macedonian, Greek, English (2006 edition)
- Publisher: Batavia, Thessaloniki
- Publication date: 1925/2006
- Publication place: Greece
- Media type: Paperback
- Pages: 96 (1925 edition)
- ISBN: 960-89330-0-5 (2006 edition)
- OCLC: 317448359

Note: "Abecedar" is also the name of the primer (1st grade school book) in Romanian.

The Abecedar was a school book first published in Athens, Greece, in 1925. The book became the subject of controversy with Bulgaria and Serbia when cited by Greece as proof it had fulfilled its international obligations towards its Slavic-speaking minority, because it had been printed in the Latin alphabet rather than the Cyrillic used by the Slavic languages of the southern Balkans. The book was initially published for the Slavic speakers of Greek Macedonia in the Lerin dialect, and has been published in Standard Macedonian, Standard Greek and Standard English.

== First printing ==
Following the Treaty of Bucharest in 1913, the southern part of Ottoman region of Macedonia was annexed to the Kingdom of Greece, with Bulgarians making up a debated portion of the overall population at the time, with estimates ranging from 10% to a 30% plurality. Under the 1920 Treaty of Sèvres, Greece opened schools for minority-language children, and in September 1924 Greece agreed to a protocol with Bulgaria to place its Slavic-speaking minority under the protection of the League of Nations as Bulgarians. However, the Greek parliament refused to ratify the protocol due to objections from Yugoslavia, considering the Slavic speakers to be Serbs rather than Bulgarians, and from Greeks who considered the Slavic speakers to be Greeks rather than Slavs. Vasilis Dendramis, the Greek representative in the League of the Nations, stated that the Macedonian Slav language was neither Bulgarian, nor Serbian, but an independent language.

The Greek government went ahead with the publication in May 1925 of the Abecedar, described by contemporary Greek writers as a primer for "the children of Slav speakers in Greece ... printed in the Latin script and compiled in the Macedonian dialect." The book was commissioned by the Department for the Education of Foreign-Speakers in the Greek Ministry of Education. It was submitted by the Greek government to the League of Nations to support its assertion that it fulfilled obligations towards the Slavic-speaking minority.

The book's publication sparked controversy in Greek Macedonia, along with Bulgaria and Yugoslavia. The Bulgarians and Serbs objected to the book being printed in Latin alphabet, because the Bulgarian and Serbian languages have been written predominately in the Cyrillic alphabet. The Bulgarian representative to the League of Nations criticized it as "incomprehensible." Although some books reached villages in Greek Macedonia, it was never used in their schools. In one village, threats by local police led to residents throwing their copies into a lake. In January 1926, the region of Florina saw extensive protests by Greek and pro-Greek Slavic speakers campaigning against the primer's publication, demanding the government change their policies on minority education.

Anthropologist Loring Danforth has argued the Abecedar was printed in the Latin alphabet "precisely to ensure [sic] that it would be rejected by all parties concerned" so "it would not contribute to the development of ties between the Slavic-speaking people of northern Greece and either Serbia or Bulgaria." The Macedonian historiography has seen it as a demonstration that a separate Macedonian language and people existed in northern Greece in 1925, and the Greek government recognized them as such. Bulgarian researchers indicate that this textbook was printed in order to mislead the international organizations that the educational rights of the Bulgarians in Greece are respected – in the moment when the Council of the League of Nations treated the question about protection of the Bulgarian minority in Greece.

According to sociologist Victor Roudometof, the incident led to significant change in the Greek government's stance toward Slavic-speaking citizens. Henceforth, they were deemed to be neither Serbs nor Bulgarians, and their difference was regarded as solely linguistic, not ethnic or political.

The first scientific review of Abecedar was made in 1925 by Bulgarian linguist Lyubomir Miletich who treated this schoolbook as an attempt to create a new Latin alphabet for Bulgarians in Greek Macedonia.

== Second and third editions ==
The Abecedar has been republished twice. A 1993 edition was published by the Macedonian Information Center in Perth, Western Australia. In 2006, an edition was published in Thessaloníki on the initiative of the ethnic Macedonian political party Rainbow. In conformity with its political platform Rainbow argues that the Abecedar is one of a number of "official Greek documents which long before 1945 defined 'Macedonian' as something different from 'Greek.'"

== Main characteristics of the Abecedar ==
The first edition of Abecedar was based on the Bitola-Florina dialect, and the vocabulary is mainly extracted from that dialect. The main characteristic of the Abecedar is that the text uses the Latin alphabet, differing from the Macedonian alphabet which used the Cyrillic alphabet and was standardized nearly two decades later, with standardization being based on the same dialect.

The alphabet used in the Abecedar consists of 27 individual letters. Two of the letters are unique in that they correspond to phonemes not represented in the modern Macedonian alphabet: Îî (for the schwa - Bulgarian ъ) and Üü (indicating palatalization of the preceding consonant). The alphabet uses the digraphs gj, kj, nj, lj and dz to represent the sounds /ɟ/, /c/, /ɲ/, an /lj/ cluster, and /d͡z/, respectively, corresponding to the Macedonian letters Ѓ, Ќ, Њ, Љ and Ѕ.

The alphabet used in the Abecedar with IPA equivalents:

А /a/	B /b/	C /t͡s/	Č /t͡ʃ/	D /d/	E /ɛ/	F /f/	G /ɡ/	H /x/
I /i/	Î /ə/	J /j/	K /k/	L /l/	M /m/	N /n/	O /ɔ/	P /p/
R /r/	S /s/	Š /ʃ/	T /t/	U /u/	Ü /-ʲu/	V /v/	Z /z/	Ž /ʒ/

The book also includes a section about grammar. All the material is supported by corresponding texts extracted and inspired by the daily life of the people for better understanding and learning. In the second edition of the book, besides the old version, the new version of the book used explanations and texts written in the Macedonian alphabet.

== Examples from the second edition of the book ==
- Našata kukja je visoka ("Our house is tall"; contemporary Macedonian: našata kukja e visoka, нашата куќа е висока);
- Gjorče et edno arno dete ("Gjorče is one good child"; contemporary Macedonian: Gjorče e edno arno dete, Ѓорче е едно арно дете);
- Moite brakja set vo čusdžina [sic] ("My brothers are abroad"; contemporary Macedonian: moite brakja se vo tugjina, моите браќа се во туѓина).

== Gallery ==
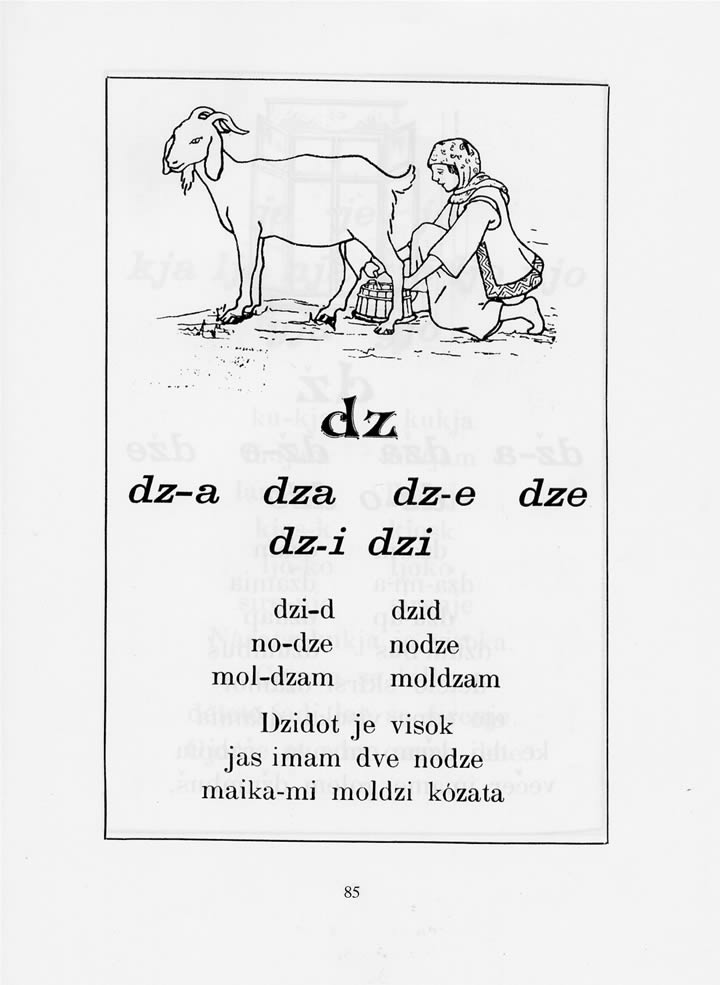
Page for the digraph dz (Ѕ in Macedonian)

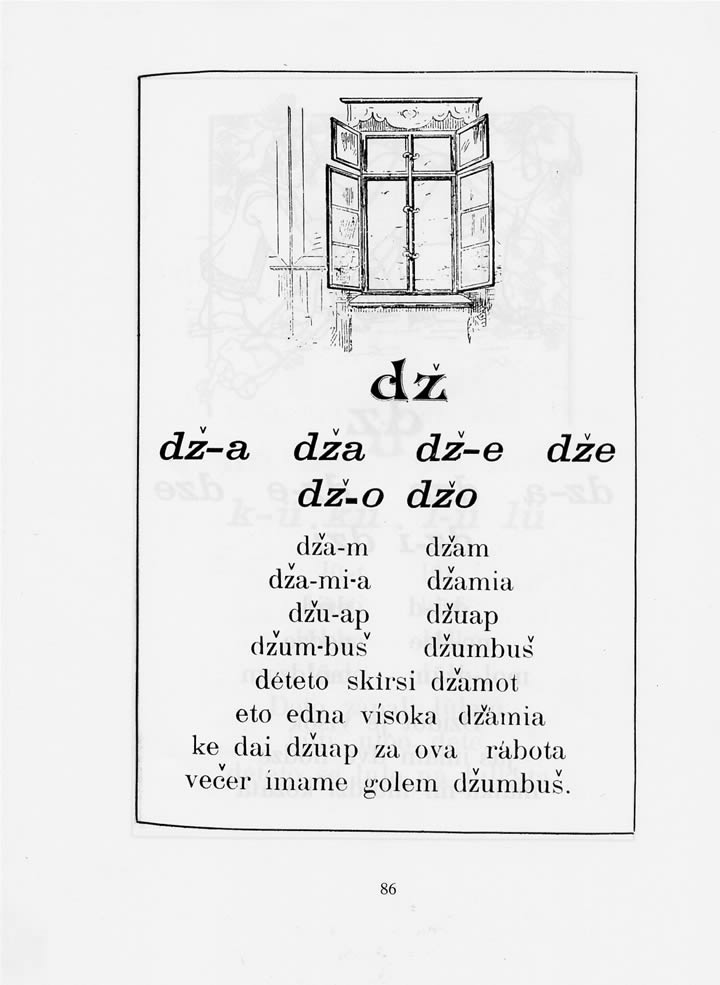
Another page for /d͡z/ in the originally published Abecedar

The first page of the Abecedar published in 2006 in Thessaloníki.

== See also ==
- Slavic-speakers of Greek Macedonia
- Romanization of Macedonian
- Bulgarian dialects
