= Rusevski =

Rusevski (Macedonian: Русевски) is a Macedonian surname. Notable people with the surname include:

- Ace Rusevski (born 1956), Macedonian boxer
- Predrag Rusevski (born 1983), Macedonian tennis player
