= Macedonian onomastics =

Part of Macedonian studies that studies names, surnames, and nicknames in Macedonian

Macedonian onomastics (Macedonian: Македонска ономастика, romanized: Makedonska onomastika) is part of Macedonian studies that studies names, surnames, and nicknames in Macedonian. This is a relatively new linguistic discipline. In Macedonia, and in Macedonian studies in general, it developed during the 19th century, when the first few research results have been provided. The onomastics for a long period of time has been considered as part of various scientific disciplines, such as geography, history or ethnography, until it became a discipline on its own in the 20th century. Macedonian onomastics, generally speaking, is divided into toponomastics and anthroponomastics.

== Division ==
Macedonian onomastics is divided into two large categories, which in turn include several different subcategories or disciplines. The two basic categories of Macedonian onomastics are:

- Toponomastics
- Anthroponomastics

== Toponomastics ==
Toponomastics is a branch of the onomastics that studies toponymy, or the names of the places, geographical terms, and their meaning and origin. Depending on the nature of the toponymy, it can be divided into the following subcategories:

- Hydronymy, which studies the names of the water bodies. Some hydronyms are: Vardar, Treska, Crna Reka, Ohrid Lake etc.
- Oronymy, which studies the names of the mountains, hills, plains, valleys, peaks, fields and other geographic components. Some examples of the Macedonian oronymies are: Šar Mountains, Polog, Pelagonia, Osogovo etc.
- Onomastics of places, which studies the names of the settlements, towns, villages, cities. Some examples are: Tetovo, Kumanovo, Skopje, Konče, Medžitlija etc.

Toponomastics uses toponomastic stratigraphy for its studies. The research of the toponymies is done via analysis of the different names of one particular item. The names are direct consequence of the different people, languages and cultures that existed on that particular area. The main principle that is taken intro account is the fact that even though the languages and people that lived in that area disappeared (via migration or assimilation), the names of the places, their meanings and origin remain. Those names later on will be acquired by the new people that came to that area and they will become part of their active lexicon.

== Anthroponomastics ==
Anthroponomastics is the second large discipline of onomastics. Anthroponomastics studies the meaning and origin of the personal names. Moreover, it deals with:

- Personal names. The origin of the Macedonian names varies. Most of them are of Macedonian Slavic origin, but there are popular names of foreign origin as well. Some names can be simple, such as Драги (Dragi), and some can be complex, such as Драгомир (Dragomir). The names are given according to people's will, way of living and the conditions where people live. They are quite important in the Macedonian society since they serve as an identification and they are basis for development of the Macedonian surnames and nicknames.
  - Many personal names unique to Macedonian were historically hypocorisms: ex. Гоце (Goce) (for Георгија (Georgija) and variants) which is now a name in its own right, while others have remained hypocorisms such as Зоки (Zoki) for Зоран (Zoran).

=== Surnames ===
- Surnames in Macedonian are predominantly made by adding the possessive suffix -ски (-ski), usually with an additional possessive suffix to a personal name -ев (-ev), title, occupation, etc. Elision is common in Spoken Macedonian and this has resulted in forms such as -оски (-oski) and -ески (-eski). An example is the surname Милевски (Milevski) which is made up of the personal name Mile and the possessive suffixes -ев (-ev) and -ски (-ski). There are some surnames without suffixes such as Темелко (Temelko), Насто (Nasto), Митре (Mitre), Никола (Nikola), Ристо (Risto), Терпо (Terpo) and Трајко (Trajko) among the Macedonians of Albania. There are also some names whose etymology is unknown. Female surnames mirror those for men, but inflect for grammatical gender: -ова (-ova), -евa (-eva), -ска (-ska). Consequently, the feminine form of the surname Milevski is Milevska (elided forms would be Mileski and Mileska, respectively).

The most common suffixes used for surnames and the most common (top 6) surnames by statistical region are as follows:

- Eastern, -ов/-ев (-ov/-ev): Стојанов, Николов, Митев, Јованов, Атанасов, Иванов. (Stojanov, Nikolov, Mitev, Jovanov, Atanasov, Ivanov).
- Northeastern, -овски/-евски (-ovski/-evski): Јовановски, Стојановски, Трајковски, Спасовски, Николовски, Илиевски. (Jovanovski, Stojanovski, Trajkovski, Spasovski, Nikolovski, Ilievski).
- Pelagonia, -о(в)ски/-е(в)ски (-o(v)ski/-e(v)ski): Ристески, Ристевски, Стојановски, Талевски, Петровски, Петрески. (Risteski, Ristevski, Stojanovski, Talevski, Petrovski, Petreski).
- Polog, an Albanian-majority region. Top 6 surnames are Albanian.
- Skopje, -овски/-евски (-ovski/-evski): Стојановски, Николовски, Трајковски, Јовановски, Петровски, Крстевски. (Stojanovski, Nikolovski, Trajkovski, Jovanovski, Petrovski, Krstevski).
- Southeastern, -ов/-ев (-ov/-ev): Стојанов, Ристов, Митев, Атанасов, Јованов, Ѓорѓиев. (Stojanov, Ristov, Mitev, Atanasov, Jovanov, Gjorgjiev).
- Southwestern, -о(в)ски/-е(в)ски (-o(v)ski/-e(v)ski): Ристески, Наумоски, Петрески, Стојаноски. (Risteski, Naumoski, Petreski, Stojanoski).
- Vardar, -ов/-ев (-ov/-ev): Стојанов, Петров, Јованов, Ристов, Николов, Димов. (Stojanov, Petrov, Jovanov, Ristov, Nikolov, Dimov).

=== Nicknames ===
- Nicknames. In Macedonian, usually, the nickname is given according to some physical characteristic of the person, but also they can reflect person's profession, personal characteristics, mental capabilities or disabilities. Some Macedonian nicknames are: буцко (bucko, "fatso"), зборко (zborko, "chatterbox"), женкар (ženkar, "ladies' man") and many others.
