= Vraneštica =

Vraneštica Вранештица
- Village
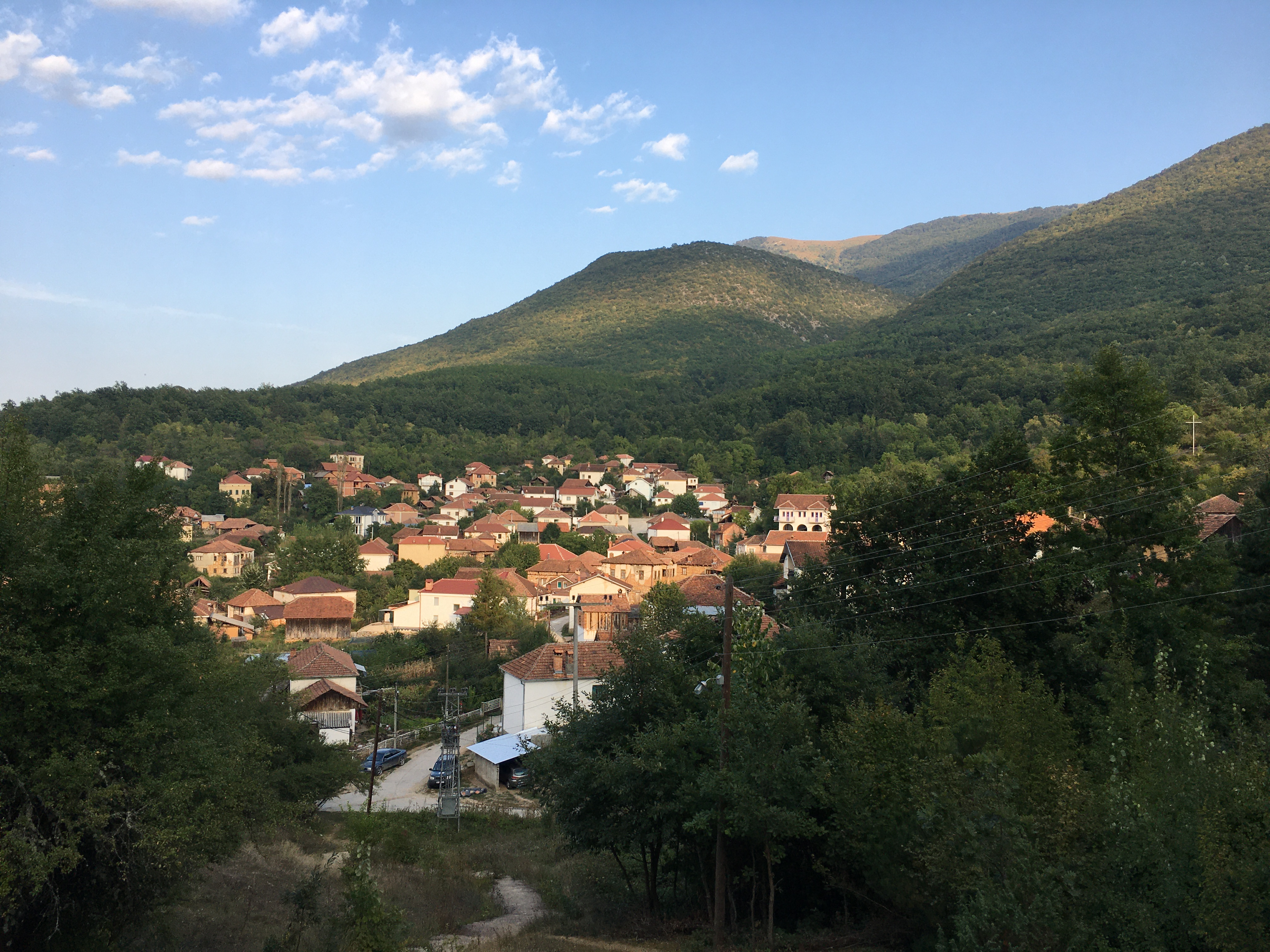
- View of the village Vraneštica

- Location within North Macedonia
- Country: North Macedonia
- Region: Southwestern
- Municipality: Kičevo

Population (2002)
  - Total: 438
- Time zone: UTC+1 (CET)
  - Summer (DST): UTC+2 (CEST)
- Website: .

Vraneštica (Macedonian: Вранештица) is a village in the municipality of Kičevo, North Macedonia. It was the seat of the now-defunct Vraneštica Municipality.

== Demographics ==
The village is attested in the 1467/68 Ottoman tax registry (defter) for the Nahiyah of Kırçova. The village had a total of 49 houses, excluding bachelors (mucerred).

According to the 2002 census, the village had a total of 438 inhabitants. Ethnic groups in the village include:

- Macedonians 437
- Serbs 1
