= Spoken Macedonian =

Variety of Macedonian

Spoken Macedonian (Macedonian: разговорен македонски јазик, romanized: razgovoren makedonski jazik) is the spoken variety of the standard Macedonian language. Spoken Macedonian can also refer to the spoken, colloquial register of a local dialect. This code is typical of the speech of the Macedonian diaspora, especially of the descendants of those who went abroad prior to the codification of the standard language in the 1940s, ethnic Macedonians in the wider region of Macedonia, and rural areas of North Macedonia. Spoken Macedonian is more inclusive of foreign elements that have become obsolete in the written standard.
