= Konstantinos Tsioulkas =

Greek educator and writer

Konstantinos I. Tsioulkas (Greek: Κωνσταντίνος Ι. Τσιούλκας; c. 1845 - 1915) was a Greek educator and writer from Western Macedonia.

== Biography ==
Tsioulkas was born in about 1845 in Korisos, Kastoria, into a family of farmers. According to Peter Mackridge, his family might have been primarily Greek-speaking. After his graduation from the main school of his village, he continued his studies with a scholarship in the Educational Association of Kastoria in the Gymnasium of Kasoria and then he taught in the Greek school of his birthplace. He opposed the attempts of the Exarchists to hold the Divine Liturgy in Bulgarian and in 1871, he succeeded together with others to drive Konstantinos Darzilovites, who, according to Tsioulkas, was the first to teach the Slavic speakers that they were Bulgarians, out of Gorenchi, just before a Bulgarian school was founded. In 1875, he was sent with a scholarship from Bellios a bequest in Athens, where he studied in the Philosophic School of the National University. In 1879, he went to Monastiri (Bitola), where he became the first gymnasiarch of the Greek gymnasium for a decade, until 1889, when he was fired because of the events relating to Pichion.

== Contributions to the bilingualism of the Macedonians ==
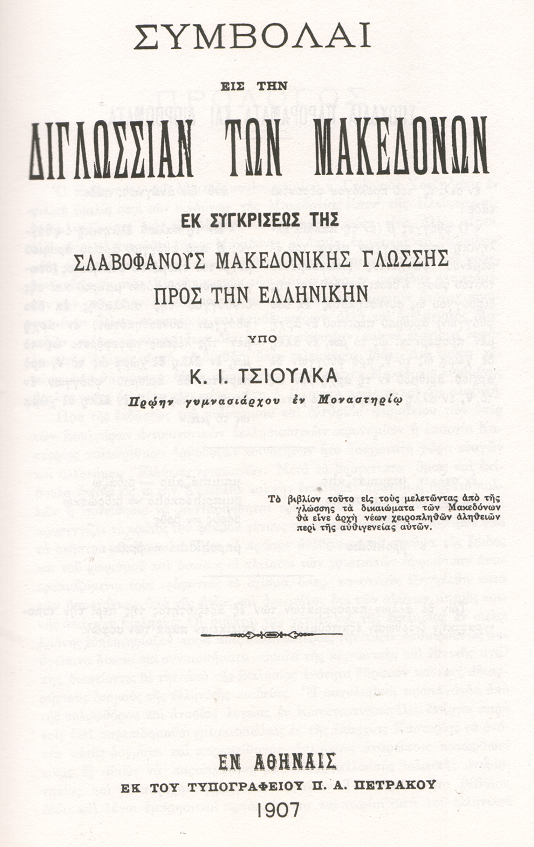
The first edition of the Contributions of Tsioulkas (Athens: Petrakos, 1907).

In 1907, he published in Athens a 350-page work of his Contributions to the bilingualism of the Macedonians by comparing the slavic-seeming Macedonian language with the Greek one ("Συμβολαί εις την διγλωσσίαν των Μακεδόνων εκ συγκρίσεως της σλαβοφανούς μακεδονικής γλώσσης προς την ελληνικήν"), in order to fight against the Bulgarian and pan-Slavist propaganda in the region of Macedonia. Tsioulkas, who claimed not to speak any Slavic language, tried by distorting historical linguistics to prove that the language of the Slavic speakers in Ottoman Macedonia was not Bulgarian, but an Ancient Greek dialect. Tsioulkas did not focus on phonology, syntax, or morphology, for which he only devoted 11 pages in total, but mainly on the vocabulary, where it is easy to find words with common, Indo-European, etymology with Greek, in order to show that the basic elements of the Macedonian vocabulary were not Slavic, but originated from Greek. To prove that the language of the Slavophones was closer to Ancient Greek than Modern Greek, he composed a list of homeric words and compared how many of them survive in the "people's" language, meaning demotic, (650) and how many in the "Slavic-seeming Macedonian" (1260). The conclusion, for Tsioulkas, was that the "Slavic-seeming Macedonian [language] was a sister of the Greek [language]" and the "Macedonian people" were native and descended from the Ancient Macedonians. Tsioulkas referred to Bulgarians as "a worthless, diminutive, alien, fat-witted, savage, brigandly people. A people unworthy of higher attention – the Japanese of Europe".

This book was among the most important in a series of pseudolinguistic publications that appeared in Greece from the beginning to the middle of the 20th century, whose writers without knowing the dialects they were writing about maintained that the "mixed" or "Slavic-seeming" dialects of the Slavophones were not Slavic. No Greek linguist supported Tsioulkas' theory, but the book was republished in 1991, during the Macedonia naming dispute, without negative commentary, but with a commendatory exordium of the former minister Nikolaos Martis. References to the book have appeared in the blogosphere. Per Mackridge, Tsioulkas unwittingly contributed to the idea that modern-day ethnic Macedonians are descended from the ancient Macedonians and are their true inheritors.

== Sources ==
- Δραγάτη, Βάια Ε. (2010). Οι Μακεδόνες στο Ελληνικό Βασίλειο, στα μέσα του 19ου αιώνα (PDF) (Postgraduate thesis). Thessaloniki: Aristotle University of Thessaloniki - Faculty of Philosophy - School of History and Archaeology.
- Ioannidou, Alexandra (1999). "Questions on the Slavic Dialects of Greek Macedonia". In Grünberg, Karsten; Pothoff, Wilfried (eds.). Ars philologica: Festschrift für Baldur Panzer zum 65. Geburtstag. Frankfurt: Peter Lang.
- Mackridge, Peter (2009). Language and National Identity in Greece 1776-1976. Oxford: Oxford University Press.
- Mackridge, Peter (2011). "The Hellenicity of the linguistic Other in Greece". Myths of the other in the Balkans.
- Τσιούλκας, Κωνσταντίνος (1907). Συμβολαί εις την διγλωσσίαν των Μακεδόνων εκ συγκρίσεως της σλαυοφανούς μακεδονικής γλώσσης προς την ελληνικήν. Athens: Print Shop Π. Α. Πετράκου.
