= Yoakim Karchovski =

Bulgarian writer (c. 1750 – c. 1820)

Yoakim Karchovski Йоаким Кърчовски Јоаким Крчовски
- Born: c. 1750
- Died: c. 1820
- Occupations: Cleric, monk and writer

Yoakim Karchovski (Bulgarian: Йоаким Кърчовски; Macedonian: Јоаким Крчовски, romanized: Joakim Krčovski; c. 1750 – c. 1820), also known as Hadži Joakim, was a cleric, writer, educator and one of the early figures of the Bulgarian National Revival.

== Biography ==
Karchovski was born around 1750. Macedonian linguist Blaže Koneski theorized that he might have originated from the Kičevo region. Karchovski was educated in Constantinople. In 1787 he began working as a priest. He was a teacher in Kratovo, Debar region, Kriva Palanka, Štip, Samokov, Melnik and Kyustendil. He had 2 sons, Georgi and David. In around 1807 Karchovski became a monk, after the death of his wife. In his writings, he identified himself as a Bulgarian and called his language Bulgarian. In 1819 he became a hieromonk. He died around 1820.

== Legacy ==
There are streets bearing his name in some cities in Bulgaria. Although he died before the earliest expressions of a Macedonian national identity, he is considered an ethnic Macedonian in North Macedonia. In May 2022 he was canonized by the Macedonian Orthodox Church as a saint.

== Works ==
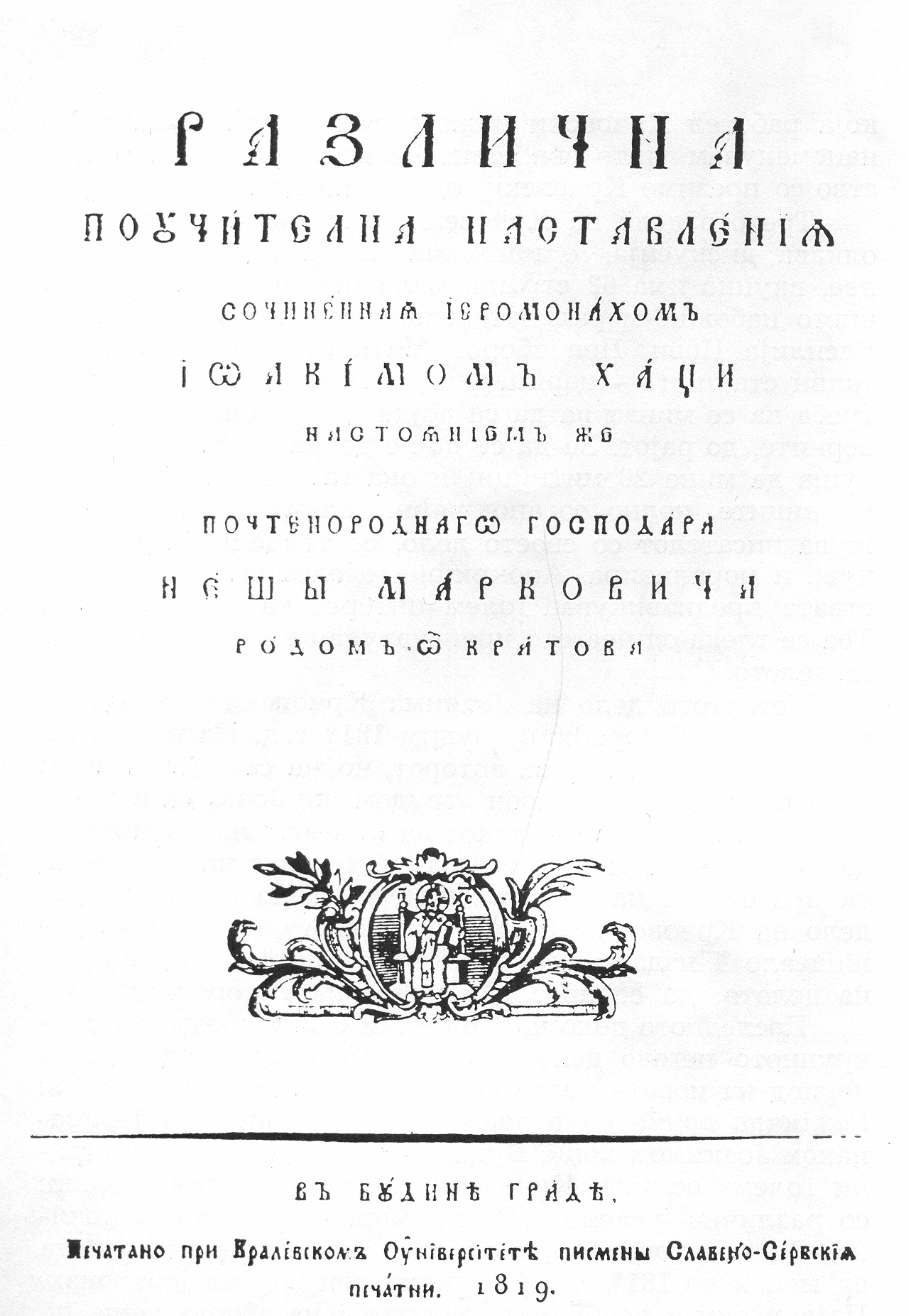
Cover of "Some edifyingly advices"

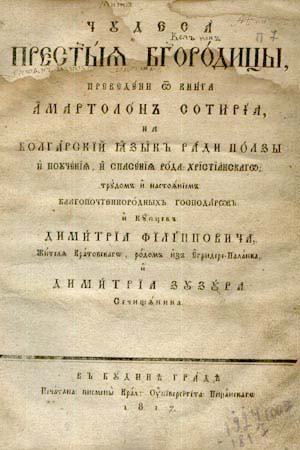
Cover of "The Wonders of the Holy Virgin"

Karchovski authored 5 works printed in Buda:

- Lecture spoken because of dying (Слово исказаное заради умирание; 1814)
- Story about the terrible and second coming of Christ (Повест ради страшнаго и втораго пришествия Христова; 1814)
- This book called suffering (Сия книга глаголемаа митарства; 1817)
- The Wonders of the Holy Virgin (Чудеса пресвятия Богородици; 1817)
- Some edifyingly advices (Различна поучителна наставления; 1819)

== See also ==
- Kiril Peychinovich
- Bulgarian National Revival
- Macedonian National Revival
