= Loring Danforth =

American professor of anthropology (born 1949)

Loring M. Danforth (born 1949) is an American professor of anthropology and an author who is a professor emeritus of Bates College. His research has focused on the interpretation of a wide variety of symbolic or expressive forms in a range of cultures.

== Education and career ==
Danforth received a B.A. from Amherst College in 1971 and a M.A. and Ph.D. from Princeton University in 1974 and 1978. He completed a doctoral dissertation titled "The anastenaria: a study in Greek ritual therapy."

He has written many books and articles on Macedonia, Greece, Australia, Saudi Arabia and nationalism. Danforth won a National Endowment for the Humanities Fellowship for College Teachers and Independent Scholars, and was a recipient of a Fulbright Fellowship. His books have been featured on the CHOICE lists. Danforth has taught at Bates College since 1978. He received the 2013 Kroepsch Award for Excellence in Teaching.

In 2016 he served as the co-curator for the contemporary Saudi art exhibit "Phantom Punch" at the Bates College Museum of Art.

He is the husband of Maine politician Margaret Rotundo. They currently reside in Lewiston, Maine. They have two children. One of his sons, Nicholas Danforth, is now a historian specializing in the history of Turkey and the Ottoman Empire. His daughter Ann, is a policy advocate for Maine Equal Justice.

== Books ==
- The Death Rituals of Rural Greece. Princeton University Press, 1982.
- Firewalking and Religious Healing: The Anastenaria of Greece and the American Firewalking Movement. Princeton University Press, 1989.
- The Macedonian Conflict: Ethnic Nationalism in a Transnational World. Princeton University Press, 1992.
- Children of the Greek Civil War. University of Chicago Press, 2012. (with Riki Van Boeschoten)
- Crossing the Kingdom: Portraits of Saudi Arabia. University of California Press, 2016.
- Phantom Punch: Contemporary Art from Saudi Arabia. Bates College Museum of Art, 2017. (with Dan Mills).
