= Prilep-Bitola dialect =

Dialect of Macedonian

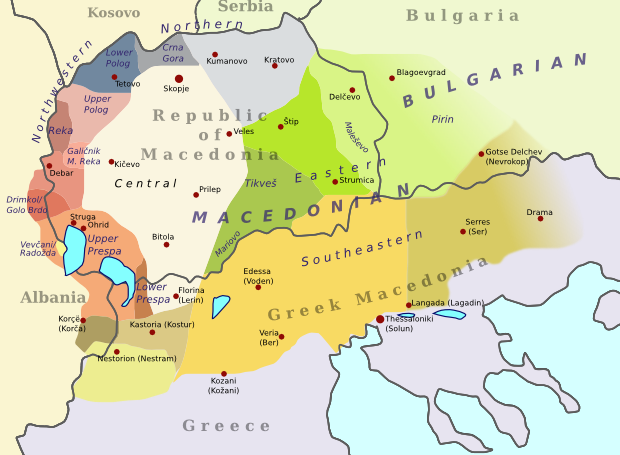
Dialectal divisions of Macedonia.

Дијалектни примери
Peter's Mourning
Folk epic told by a resident of Topolčani, Prilep region

The Pebble Stew
Tale told by a woman from the city of Bitola

The Prilep-Bitola dialect (Macedonian: Прилепско-битолски дијалект, Prilepsko-bitolski dijalekt) is a member of the central subgroup of the western group of dialects of Macedonian. This dialect is spoken in much of the Pelagonia region (more specifically, the Bitola, Prilep, Kruševo and Demir Hisar municipalities), as well as by the Slavic-speaking minority population in and around Florina (Lerin) in neighbouring Greek Macedonia. The Prilep-Bitola dialect, along with other peripheral west-central dialects, provides much of the basis for modern Standard Macedonian. Prestige dialects have developed in the cities of Bitola and Prilep.

== Phonological characteristics ==
The phonological characteristics of the Bitola-Prilep dialect which can also be found in the other peripheral dialects are:

- mostly antepenultimate word stress (see Macedonian phonology);
- Proto-Slavic *ǫ has reflexed into /a/:

rǫka > рака /ˈraka/ ('hand')

- except for the Prilep sub-dialects, Bitola sub-dialects have two phonemic lateral consonants (/ɫ/ and /l/, continuants of Proto-Slavic *l and *ĺ):

ex. Proto-Slavic *kĺučь > [ˈklut͡ʃ] in Bitola sub-dialects, [ˈkɫut͡ʃ] in Prilep sub-dialects

- while most Macedonian dialects have a phonemic /f/ (in loanwords), many sub-dialects of the Prilep-Bitola dialect—with the exception of urban prestige dialects—instead have /v/:

Megleno-Romanian fustan /ˈfustan/ > вустан /ˈvustan/ ('ladies' dress')
Ottoman Turkish فوطة /ˈfuta/ > вута /ˈvuta/ ('apron')
Ottoman Turkish فرنا /ˈfuɾna/ > вурна /ˈvurna/ ('bakehouse, masonry oven')

- the palatal affricates are typically prepalatalized: свеќа /ˈsvɛca/ ('candle') is realized as [ˈsvɛjca], меѓа /ˈmɛɟa/ ('border, frontier') is realized as [ˈmɛjɟa] and in Prilep, especially in younger speakers as [ˈsvɛjt͡ʃa] and [ˈmɛjd͡ʒa];
  - a similar features occurs with the palatal nasal: јадење /ˈjadɛɲɛ/ ('food') is realized as [ˈjadɛjnɛ];
- the etymological /v/ in initial position has been lost in a number of instances:
  - in the sequences *vs- and *vz-, as is the case in the standard; e.g. сè /sɛ/ ('all') from the earlier *все, зема /ˈzɛma/ ('to take') from the earlier *взема;
  - in a handful of words where the pronunciation was "evened up" with that of their antonyms: натре /ˈnatrɛ/ from the earlier внатре /ˈvnatrɛ/ ('inside') as per надвор /ˈnadvɔr/ ('outside'), ногу /ˈnɔɡu/ from the earlier многу /ˈmnɔɡu/ ('much, a lot') as per малку /ˈmalku/ ('a little');
- intervocalic consonant elision is typical of this dialect, and elided forms are in free variation with non-elided forms:
  - elision of the intervocalic /v/:
    - in the plural forms of monosyllabic nouns, e.g. лебо(в)и:

/ˈlɛbɔvi/ → /ˈlɛbɔi/ (realized as [ˈlɛbɔi̯] ~ [ˈlɛbɔj])

- and in most other positions, e.g. то(в)ар:

/ˈtɔvar/ → /ˈtɔar/ (realized as [tɔa̯r])

- certain short words (conjunctions, pronouns, determiners, etc.) have undergone further elision, ex.:

/ˈsɛɡa/ (→ /ˈsɛa/) → [sa(ː)] ('now')
*/ˈtɔva/ (→ /ˈtɔa/) → [tɔ(ː)] (indic. pron. 'that')
/ˈkɔɡa/ (→ /ˈkɔa/) → [kɔ(ː)] (interr. pron. 'when')

- insertion of /t/ and /d/ into consonant clusters -/sr/- and -/zr/-, respectively; for example, /stram/ from the earlier /sram/ (срам, 'shame') and /zdrɛl/ from the earlier /zrɛl/ (зрел, 'ripe').
- use of /v/ instead of the archaic /x/: страх (strah) > страв (strav; fear);
- In the sub-dialect of Bukovo-Orehovo, especially among the oldest generations:
  - while [ɫ] is an allophone of /l/ in most dialects (occurring in all positions except before front vowels and /j/), in this dialect [ɣ] is used instead; ex.:

[ɡɣaː] for [ˈɡɫava] (глава, 'head') and [ˈsɣama] for [ˈsɫama] (слама, 'straw')

  - the phoneme /a/ mutates (is raised) to [ɛ̞] ([æ] ~ [ɛ]) when preceding an affricate or iotated consonant with the exception of suffixes; ex.:

чаша /ˈt͡ʃaʃa/ ('cup') is realized as [ˈt͡ʃɛ̞ʃa]
жаба /ˈʒaba/ ('frog') is realized as [ˈʒɛ̞ba]

  - the Proto-Slavic syllabic *l̥ has reflexed into /ə/, e.g. *sъlnьce > /ˈsənt͡sɛ/ ('sun'), *vьlkъ > /vək/ ('wolf').

== Morphological characteristics ==
- tripartite definite article pertaining to the position of the object (see Macedonian grammar);
- use of the preposition во (vo) or в (v);
- use of the grammatical construction have + past participle: имам работено (imam raboteno; I have worked);
- merger of thematic е-group verbs to и-group verbs; e.g. јаде /ˈjade/ → јади /ˈjadi/ (3P sg. PRS of 'to eat');
- the third-person personal pronouns: тој, та/таа/таја, то(а), тие/тија (he, she, it, they);
  - some of the outermost dialects of the Lerin subdialect have он, она, то, они;
- imperfective verbs are typically derived from perfective verbs by means of the suffix –ва (e.g. зборва and боледва) in Bitola dialects, but standard -ува in Prilep dialects;
- 'expansion' where other dialects have palatalization: падина ("to fall", sing. present third-person) versus the standard паѓа;
- use of the oblique form for proper names;
- no distinction between masculine and feminine short possessive pronouns, i.e. consistent use of му and го for both genders, in Bitola dialects, but they are used in the plural third person in Prilep;
- use of -јќум and -јким instead of the standard -јќи for the gerund, in older speakers, e.g. одејќум (while walking).

== Typical words ==
- чупе (/ˈt͡ʃupɛ/) 'girl'
- преѓе (/ˈprɛɟɛ/), преѓеска (/ˈprɛɟɛska/) 'recently, lately'
- модистра (/ˈmɔdistra/) 'seamstress'
- бендиса (/ˈbɛndisa/) 'to have a liking for something or someone', 'to fancy'
- сурат (/ˈsurat/) 'face'
- плусне (/ˈplusnɛ/) 'to fire (a rifle)'
- капнат (/ˈkapnat/) 'exhausted'
- греда (/ˈɡrɛda/) 'plank', 'beam (of wood)'
