= Standard Macedonian =

Variety of Macedonian

Standard Macedonian or literary Macedonian (Macedonian: книжевен македонски јазик, romanized: kniževen makedonski jazik or македонски литературен јазик, makedonski literaturen jazik) is the standard variety of the Macedonian language and the official language of North Macedonia used in writing, in formal contexts, and for communication between different dialect areas. Several prestige dialects have developed around the major urban centers of Skopje, Bitola, Veles and Prilep.

It was only in the 1940s, however, that the Macedonian language was able to be implemented, after being formally declared the official language of the Socialist Republic of Macedonia. The rapid pace at which the standardization process took place was in part owing to an already existing interdialect (see spoken Macedonian). The Yugoslav government initially set up a literary Macedonian language based on a spoken dialect of the northern of the Socialist Republic of Macedonia, but it was felt that this dialect was too close to Serbian and finally the dialects spoken in Bitola and Veles were adopted. These dialects, in turn, were closer to the literary Bulgarian, but as the latter was based on the Eastern Bulgarian dialects, it allowed enough differentiation for the Yugoslavs to claim a distinct Macedonian language. Since then, Bulgaria has been contesting the existence of distinct Macedonian language. Thus, the standard variety of Macedonian is phonologically and morphologically based on the central Western Macedonian dialects (in particular, the Prilep-Bitola and Skopje-Veles dialect) with its lexicon influenced by all Macedonian dialects.

Educated speakers will usually use, or aim to use, the sanctioned standard in public settings and in most forms of written language. Probably the best exemplars of this type of speech, though not always the case, are actors, teachers and writers. A high degree of social prestige and respect is assigned to those who can use the standard language in the appropriate situations. In extremely rare examples, some speakers will use the standardized code exclusively in everyday conversational speech.

While acquisition of the formal code constitutes a significant part of elementary education, during which children are taught the relationship between their local dialect and the target code, the formal literary language. Most educated speakers switch to the colloquial register of the standard language, spoken Macedonian, when communicating in less formal circumstances, but tend to aim for more formal usage in circumstances where educated speakers are present or as a sort of "interdialect" in the case where the company is not exclusively local.
