= Western Macedonian dialects =

Group of dialects of Macedonian

The Western Macedonian dialects are one of three groups of Macedonian. The group is located in the western and southwestern areas of North Macedonia and smaller parts in Mala Prespa and Golo Brdo, in Albania, and the Florina regional unit, in Greece. The group of Western Macedonian dialects is divided into two subgroups: the central group and the western and northwestern group.

== Dialects ==
=== Central group ===
- Prilep-Bitola dialect
- Kičevo-Poreče dialect
- Skopje-Veles dialect

=== Western and northwestern group ===
- Gostivar dialect (Upper Polog dialect)
- Reka dialect
- Galičnik dialect (Small Reka dialect)
- Debar dialect
- Drimkol-Golo Brdo dialect
- Vevčani-Radožda dialect
- Struga dialect
- Ohrid dialect
- Upper Prespa dialect
- Lower Prespa dialect
