= Eastern South Slavic =

Subgroup of South Slavic languages

- Macedo-Bulgarian
- Geographic distribution: Central and Eastern Balkans
- Linguistic classification: Indo-European: Balto-Slavic; Slavic; South Slavic; Eastern South Slavic
- Subdivisions: Bulgarian; Macedonian; †Church Slavonic; (?) Torlakian

Language codes
- Glottolog: east2269 mace1252

The Eastern South Slavic dialects form the eastern subgroup of the South Slavic languages. They are spoken mostly in Bulgaria and North Macedonia, and adjacent areas in the neighbouring countries. They form the Macedo-Bulgarian or the so-called Balkan Slavic linguistic area, which encompasses the southeastern part of the dialect continuum of South Slavic.

== Linguistic features ==
=== Languages and dialects ===
South Slavic dialect continuum with major dialect groups

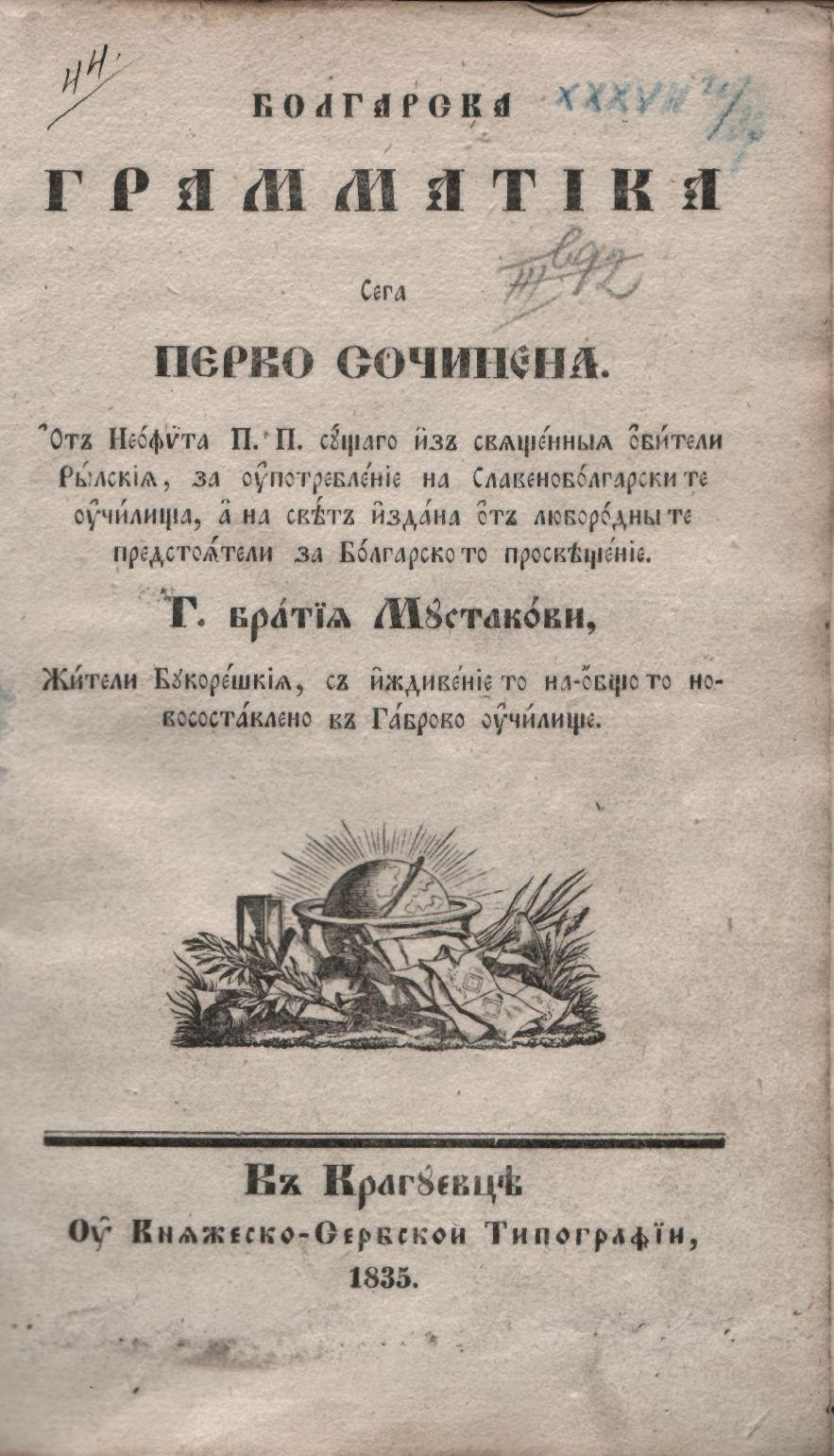
Front cover of the first grammar book of the modern Bulgarian language published by Neofit Rilski in 1835. Rilski was born in Bansko, easternmost Ottoman Macedonia, a town lying exactly on the Yat border. His grammar was based on the dialect of his hometown and included significant admixture from Church Slavonic.

Essay about the Bulgarian language, published by Parteniy Zografski from the town of Galičnik, westernmost Ottoman Macedoniain, in the Balgarski knizhitsi (Bulgarian Booklets) magazine in 1858. Zografski argues that the Bulgarian language consists of two main dialects, one spoken in Moesia and Thrace and another one spoken in, particularly, western Macedonia; he proposes that the literary language be based on both.

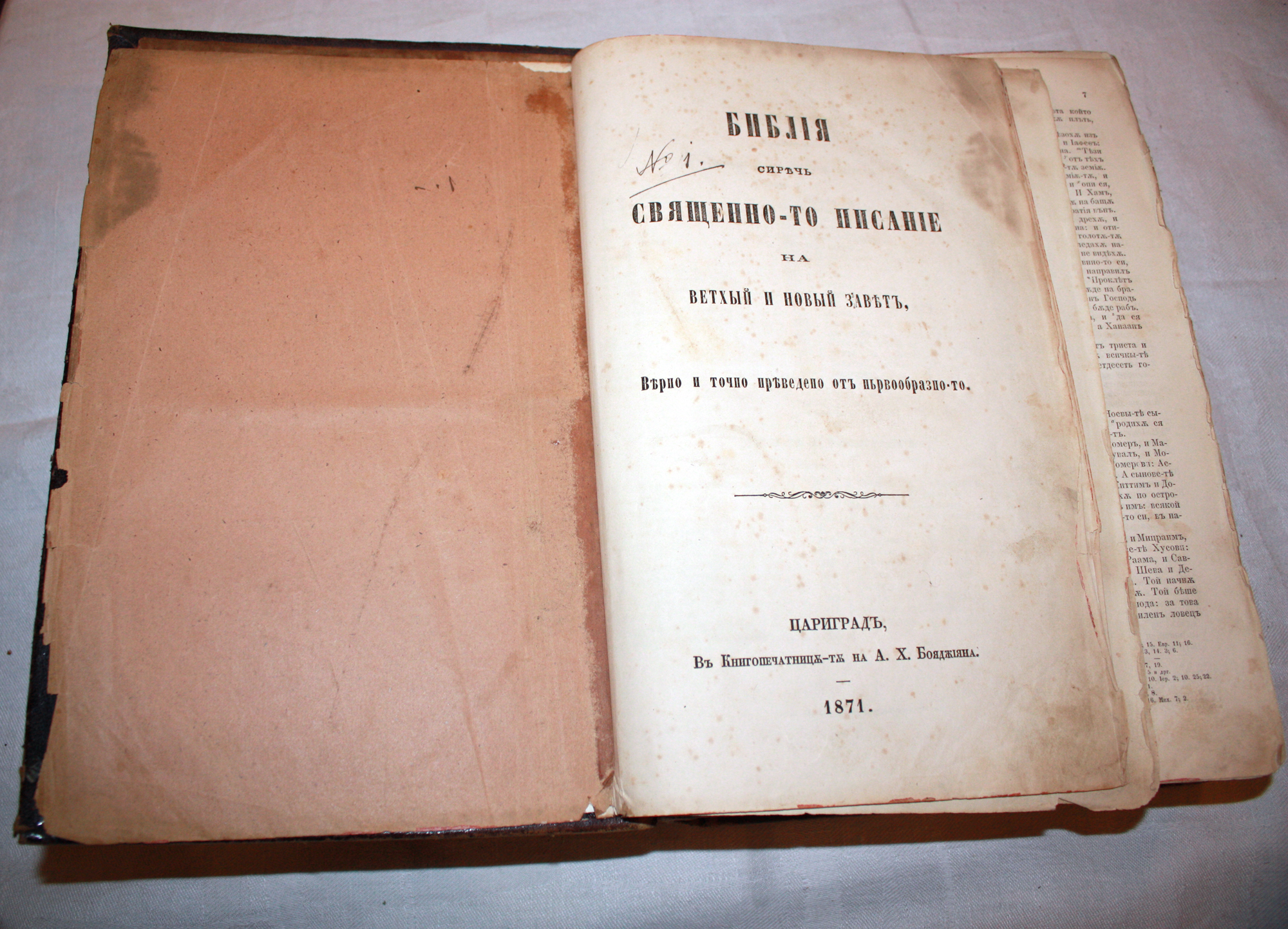
The first complete edition of the Bible in modern Bulgarian, translated by Petko Slaveykov and printed in Istanbul in 1871. The Bible was published primarily in the Eastern dialect. Slaveykov was from Veliko Tarnovo, but his family hailed from Bansko or Yakoruda in Pirin Macedonia.

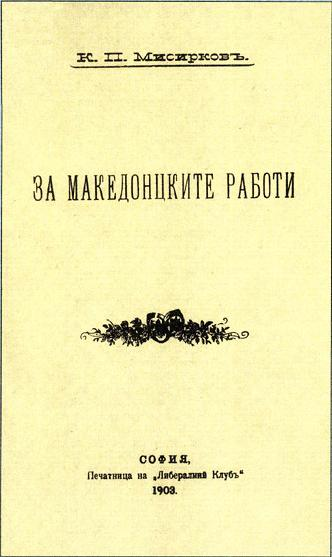
Front cover of On the Macedonian Matters published in 1903 by Krste Misirkov, in which he laid down the principles of modern Macedonian. Misirkov came from the village of Postol in Ottoman Central Macedonia.

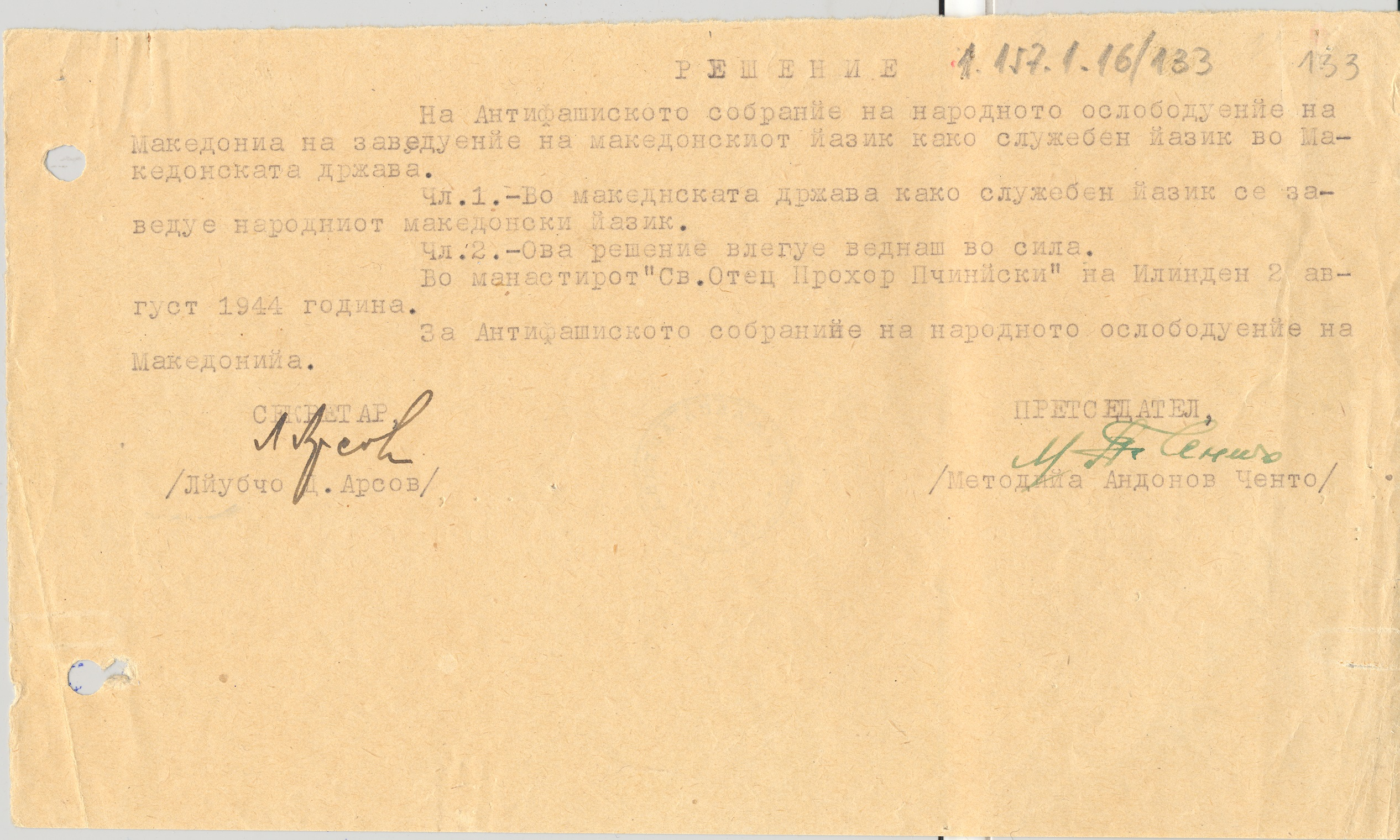
Decision about the proclamation of the Macedonian as an official language on 2 August 1944 by ASNOM.

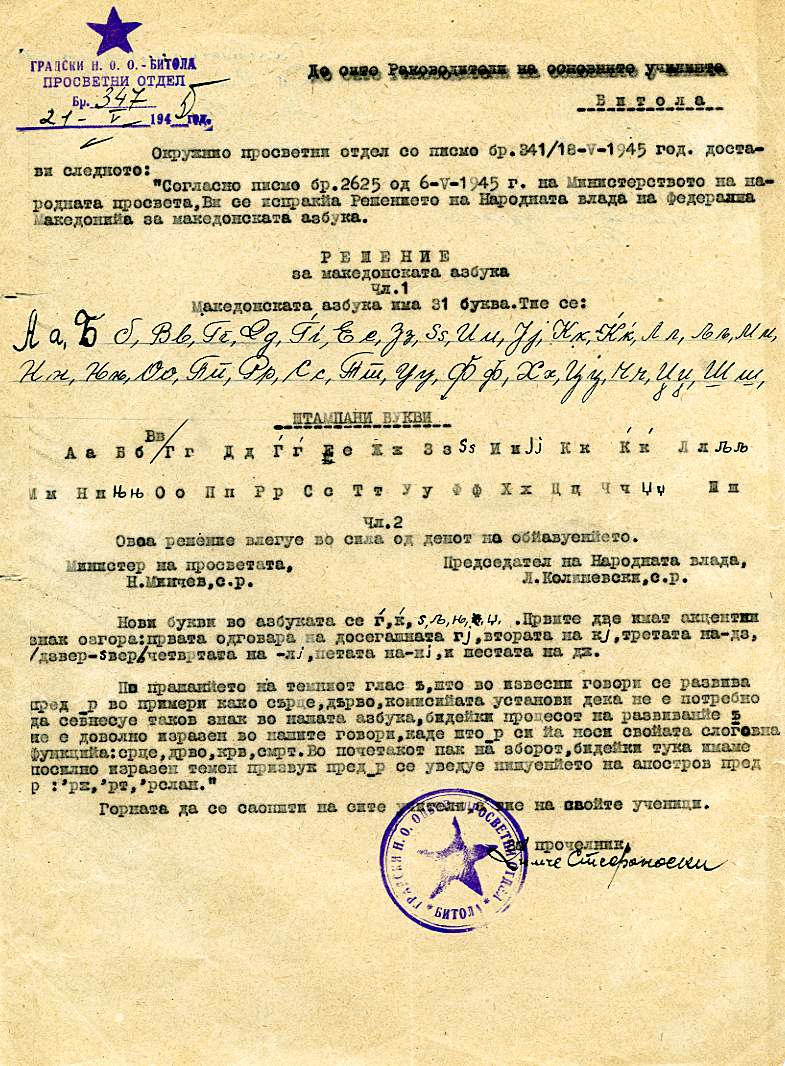
Decision about the Macedonian Alphabet 1 May 1945. Note it is written on a Bulgarian typewriter using Й and there are hand-written Ѕ, Ј and Џ, and diacritics added to create Ѓ and Ќ. The rejection of the Ъ, together with the adoption of Ј, Џ, Љ and Њ, led some authors to consider this process led by Blaze Koneski to be part of conducted "serbianization".

Eastern South Slavic dialects share a number of characteristics that set them apart from the other branch of the South Slavic languages, the Western South Slavic languages. The Eastern South Slavic group consists of Bulgarian and Macedonian, and according to some authors encompasses the southeastern dialect of Serbian, the so-called Prizren-Timok dialect. The last is part of the broader transitional Torlakian dialectal area. The Balkan Slavic area is also part of the Balkan Sprachbund. The external boundaries of the Balkan Slavic/Eastern South Slavic area can be defined with the help of some linguistic structural features. The most important of them include: the loss of the infinitive and case declension, and the use of enclitic definite articles. In the Balkan Slavic languages, clitic doubling also occurs, which is a characteristic feature of all the languages of the Balkan Sprachbund. The grammar of Balkan Slavic looks like a hybrid of "Slavic" and "Romance" grammars with some Albanian additions. The Serbo-Croatian vocabulary in both Macedonian and Serbian-Torlakian is very similar, stemming from the border changes of 1878, 1913, and 1918, when these areas came under direct Serbian linguistic influence.

=== Areal ===
The external and internal boundaries of the linguistic sub-group between the transitional Torlakian dialect and Serbian and between Macedonian and Bulgarian languages are not clearly defined. For example, standard Serbian, which is based on its Western (Eastern Herzegovinian dialect), is very different from its Eastern (Prizren-Timok dialect), especially in its position in the Balkan Sprachbund. During the 19th century, the Balkan Slavic dialects were often described as forming the Bulgarian language. At the time, the areas east of Niš were considered under direct Bulgarian ethnolinguistic influence and in the middle of the 19th century, that motivated the Serb linguistic reformer Vuk Karadžić to use the Eastern Herzegovina dialects for his standardisation of Serbian. Older Serbian scholars believed that the Yat border divides the Serbian and Bulgarian languages. However, modern Serbian linguists such as Pavle Ivić have accepted that the main isoglosses bundle dividing Eastern and Western South Slavic runs from the mouth of the Timok river alongside Osogovo mountain and Sar Mountain. In Bulgaria this isogloss is considered the eastern most border of the broader set of transitional Torlakian dialects.

In turn, Bulgarian linguists prior to World War II classified the Torlakian dialects or, in other words, all of Balkan Slavic as Bulgarian on the basis of their structural features, e.g., lack of case inflection, existence of a postpositive definite article and renarrative mood, use of clitics, preservation of final l, etc. Individual researchers, such as Krste Misirkov, in one of his Bulgarian nationalist periods, and Benyo Tsonev have pushed the linguistic border even further west to include the Kosovo-Resava dialects or, in other words, all Serbian dialects having analytical features. Both countries currently accept the state border prior to 1919 to also be the boundary between the two languages.

Slavic speakers in Macedonia referred to their own language as balgàrtzki, bùgarski or bugàrski; i.e. Bulgarian. However, Bulgarian was standardized at the end of the 19th century on the basis of its eastern Central Balkan dialect, while Macedonian was standardized in the middle of the 20th century using its west-central Prilep-Bitola dialect. Although some researchers still describe the standard Macedonian and Bulgarian languages as varieties of a pluricentric language, they have very different and remote dialectal bases.

According to Chambers and Trudgill, the question whether Bulgarian and Macedonian are distinct languages or dialects of a single language cannot be resolved on a purely linguistic basis, but should rather take into account sociolinguistic criteria, i.e., ethnic and linguistic identity. As for the Slavic dialects of Greece, Trudgill classifies the dialects in the east Greek Macedonia as part of the Bulgarian language area and the rest as Macedonian dialects. Jouko Lindstedt opines that the dividing line between Macedonian and Bulgarian is defined by the linguistic identity of the speakers, i.e., the state border; but has suggested the reflex of the back yer as a potential boundary if the application of purely linguistic criteria were possible. According to Riki van Boeschoten, the dialects in eastern Greek Macedonia (around Serres and Drama) are closest to Bulgarian, those in western Greek Macedonia (around Florina and Kastoria) are closest to Macedonian, while those in the centre (Edessa and Salonica) are intermediate between the two.

=== History ===
Some of the phenomena that distinguish western and eastern subgroups of the South Slavic people and languages can be explained by two separate migratory waves of different Slavic tribal groups of the future South Slavs via two routes: the west and east of the Carpathian Mountains. The western Balkans was settled with Sclaveni, the eastern with Antes. The early habitat of the Slavic tribes, that are said to have moved to Bulgaria, was described as being in present Ukraine and Belarus. The mythical homeland of the Serbs and Croats lies in the area of present day Bohemia, in the present-day Czech Republic and in Lesser Poland. In this way, the Balkans were settled by different groups of Slavs from different dialect areas. This is evidenced by some isoglosses of ancient origin, dividing the western and eastern parts of the South Slavic range.

The extinct Old Church Slavonic, which survives in a relatively small body of manuscripts, most of them written in the First Bulgarian Empire during the 10th century, is also classified as Eastern South Slavic. The language has an Eastern South Slavic basis with small admixture of Western Slavic features, inherited during the mission of Saints Cyril and Methodius to Great Moravia during the 9th century. New Church Slavonic represents a later stage of the Old Church Slavonic, and is its continuation through the liturgical tradition introduced by its precursor. Ivo Banac maintains that during the Middle Ages, Torlakian and Eastern Herzegovinian dialects were Eastern South Slavic, but since the 12th century, the Shtokavian dialects, including Eastern Herzegovinian, began to separate themselves from the other neighboring Eastern dialects, among them Torlakian.

The specific contact mechanism in the Balkan Sprachbund, based on the high number of second Balkan language speakers there, is among the key factors that reduced the number of Slavic morphological categories in that linguistic area. The Primary Chronicle, written ca. 1100, claims that then the Vlachs attacked the Slavs on the Danube and settled among them. Nearly at the same time are dated the first historical records about the emerging Albanians, as living in the area to the west of the Lake Ohrid. There are references in some Byzantine documents from that period to "Bulgaro-Albano-Vlachs" and even to "Serbo-Albano-Bulgaro-Vlachs". As a consequence, case inflection, and some other characteristics of Slavic languages, were lost in Eastern South Slavic area, approximately between the 11th–16th centuries. Migratory waves were particularly strong in the 16th–19th century, bringing about large-scale linguistic and ethnic changes on the Central and Eastern Balkan South Slavic area. They reduced the number of Slavic-speakers and led to the additional settlement of Albanian and Vlach-speakers there.

=== Separation between Macedonian and Bulgarian ===
The rise of nationalism under the Ottoman Empire began to degrade its specific social system, and especially the so-called Rum millet, through constant identification of the religious creed with ethnicity. The national awakening of each ethnic group was complex and most of the groups interacted with each other.

During the Bulgarian national revival, which occurred in the 19th century, the Bulgarian and Macedonian Slavs under the supremacy of the Greek Orthodox clergy wanted to create their own Church and schools which would use a common modern "Macedono-Bulgarian" literary standard, called simply Bulgarian. The national elites active in this movement used mainly ethnolinguistic principles to differentiation between "Slavic-Bulgarian" and "Greek" groups. At that time, every ethnographic subgroup in the Macedonian-Bulgarian linguistic area wrote in their own local dialect and choosing a "base dialect" for the new standard was not an issue. Subsequently, during the 1850s and 1860s a long discussion was held in the Bulgarian periodicals about the need for a dialectal group (eastern, western or compromise) upon which to base the new standard and which dialect that should be. During the 1870s this issue became contentious, and sparked fierce debates. The general opposition arose between Western and Eastern dialects in the Eastern South Slavic linguistic area. The fundamental issue then was in which part of the Bulgarian lands the Bulgarian tongue was preserved in a most true manner and every dialectal community insisted on that. The Eastern dialect was proposed then as a basis by the majority of the Bulgarian elite. It was claiming that around the last medieval capital of Bulgaria Tarnovo, the Bulgarian language was preserved in its purest form. It was not a surprise, because the most significant part of the new Bulgarian intelligentsia came from the towns of the Eastern Sub-Balkan valley in Central Bulgaria. This proposal alienated a considerable part of the then Bulgarian population and stimulated regionalist linguistic tendencies in Macedonia. In 1870 Marin Drinov, who played a decisive role in the standardization of the Bulgarian language, practically rejected the proposal of Parteniy Zografski and Kuzman Shapkarev for a mixed eastern and western Bulgarian/Macedonian foundation of the standard Bulgarian language, stating in his article in the newspaper Makedoniya: "Such an artificial assembly of written language is something impossible, unattainable and never heard of." and instead suggested that authors themselves use dialectal features in their work, thus becoming role models and allowing the natural development of a literary language. In turn, this position was heavily criticised by Eastern Bulgarian scholars and authors such as Ivan Bogorov and Ivan Vazov, the latter of whom noting that "Without the beautiful words found in the Macedonia dialects, we will be unable to make our language either richer or purer."

"Macedonian dialects" at the time generally referred to the Western Macedonian dialects rather than to all Slavic dialects in the geographic region of Macedonia. For example, scholar Yosif Kovachev from Štip in Eastern Macedonia proposed in 1875 that the "Middle Bulgarian" or "Shop dialect" of Kyustendil (in southwestern Bulgaria) and Pijanec (in eastern North Macedonia) be used as a basis for the Bulgarian literary language as a compromise and middle ground between what he himself referred to as the "Northern Bulgarian" or Balkan dialect and the "Southern Bulgarian" or "Macedonian" dialect. Moreover, Southeastern Macedonia east of the ridges of the Pirin and then of a line stretching from Sandanski to Thessaloniki, which is located east of the Bulgarian Yat boundary and speaks Eastern Bulgarian dialects that are much more closely related to the Bulgarian dialects in the Rhodopes and Thrace than to the neighbouring Slavic dialects in Macedonia, largely did not participate at all in the debate as it was mostly Hellenophile at the time.

In 1878, a distinct Bulgarian state was established. The new state did not include the region of Macedonia which remained outside its borders in the frame of the Ottoman Empire. As a consequence, the idea of a common compromise standard was finally rejected by the Bulgarian codifiers during the 1880s and the eastern Central Balkan dialect was chosen as a basis for standard Bulgarian. Macedono-Bulgarian writers and organizations who continued to seek greater representation of Macedonian dialects in the Bulgarian standard were deemed separatists. (Note: See:) One example is the Young Macedonian Literary Association, which the Bulgarian government outlawed in 1892. Though standard Bulgarian was taught in the local schools in Macedonia till 1913, the fact of political separation became crucial for the development of a separate Macedonian language.

With the advent of Macedonian nationalism, the idea of linguistic separatism emerged in the late 19th century, and the need for a separate Macedonian standard language subsequently appeared in the early 20th century. In the Interwar period, the territory of today's North Macedonia became part of the Kingdom of Yugoslavia, Bulgarian was banned for use and the local vernacular fell under heavy influence from the official Serbo-Croatian language. However, the political and paramilitary organizations of the Macedonian Slavs in Europe and the Americas, the Internal Macedonian Revolutionary Organization (IMRO) and the Macedonian Patriotic Organization (MPO), and even their left-wing offsets, the IMRO (United) and the Macedonian-American People's League continued to use literary Bulgarian in their writings and propaganda in the interbellum. During the World wars Bulgaria's short annexations over Macedonia saw two attempts to bring the Macedonian dialects back towards Bulgarian. This political situation stimulated the necessity of a separate Macedonian language and led gradually to its codification after the Second World War. It followed the establishment of SR Macedonia, as part of Communist Yugoslavia and finalized the progressive split in the common Macedonian–Bulgarian language.

By the middle of the 20th century, the national identity of the Macedonian Slavs had shifted from predominantly Bulgarian to ethnic Macedonian and their regional identity had become their national one. Although, there was no clear separating line between these two languages on level of dialect then, the Macedonian standard was based on its westernmost dialects. Afterwards, Macedonian became the official language in the new republic, Serbo-Croatian was adopted as a second official language, and Bulgarian was proscribed. Moreover, in 1946–1948 the newly standardized Macedonian language was introduced as a second language even in Southwestern Bulgaria. Subsequently, the sharp and continuous deterioration of the political relationships between the two countries, the influence of both standard languages during the time, but also the strong Serbo-Croatian linguistic influence in Yugoslav era, led to a horizontal cross-border dialectal divergence. Although some researchers have described the standard Macedonian and Bulgarian languages as varieties of a pluricentric language, they in fact have separate dialectal bases; the Prilep-Bitola dialect and Central Balkan dialect, respectively. The prevailing academic consensus (outside of Bulgaria and Greece) is that Macedonian and Bulgarian are two autonomous languages within the eastern subbranch of the South Slavic languages. Macedonian is thus an ausbau language; i.e. it is delimited from Bulgarian as these two standard languages have separate dialectal bases. The uniqueness of Macedonian in comparison to Bulgarian is a matter of political controversy in Bulgaria.

== Differences between Macedonian and Bulgarian ==
=== Phonetics ===
- Word stress in Macedonian is antepenultimate, meaning it falls on the third from last syllable in words with three or more syllables, on the second syllable in words with two syllables and on the first or only syllable in words with one syllable. This means that Macedonian has fixed accent and for the most part automatically determined. Word stress in Bulgarian, just like Old Church Slavonic, is free and can fall on almost any syllable of the word, as well as on various morphological units like prefixes, roots, suffixes and articles. However, the easternmost dialects in North Macedonia like the Maleshevo dialect, the Dojran dialect and most Slavic dialects in Greece have free word stress.

Word stress
| Macedonian | Bulgarian | English |
|---|---|---|
| грáд | грáд | city |
| грáдот | градъ́т | the city |
| грáдови | градовé | cities |
| градóвите | градовéте | the cities |

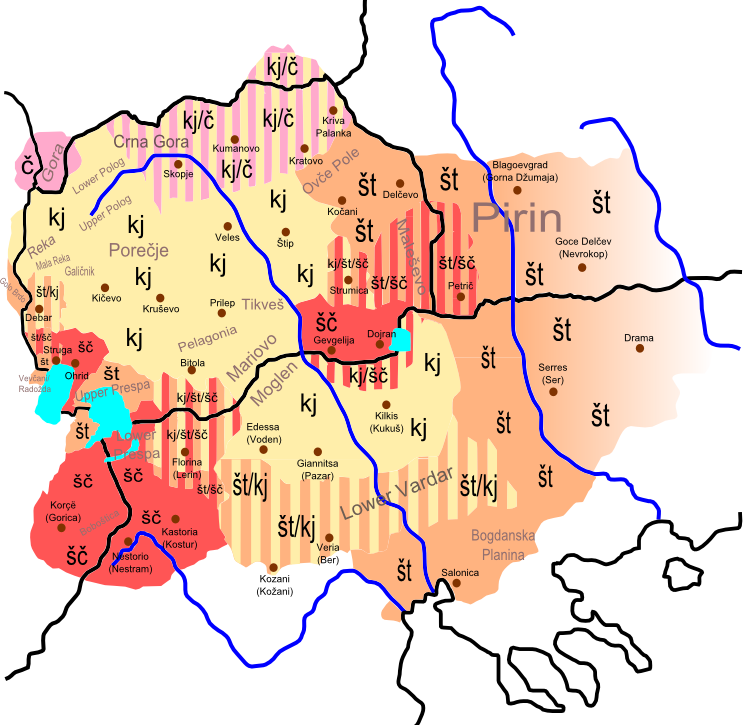
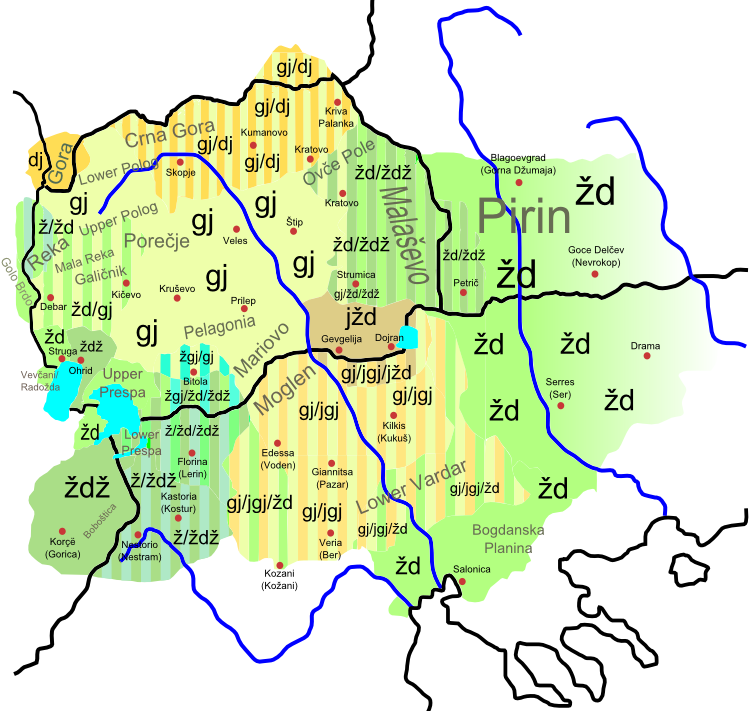
Reflexes of Pra-Slavic *tʲ/kt and *dʲ in the wider Macedonian region
- Reflexes of Pra-Slavic *tʲ/kt and *dʲ: Bulgarian has kept the Old Church Slavonic reflexes щ /ʃt/ and жд /ʒd/ for Pra-Slavic *tʲ/kt and *dʲ, whereas Macedonian developed the velar ќ /c/ and ѓ /ɟ/ in their place under Serbian influence in the Late Middle Ages. However, many dialects in North Macedonia and the wider Macedonian region have retained the consonants or use the transitional шч /ʃtʃ/ and жџ /ʒdʒ/.

Reflexes of Pra-Slavic *tʲ, *kt and *dʲ
| Bulgarian | Macedonian | English |
|---|---|---|
| пращам [praʃtam] | праќам [pracam] | send |
| нощ [noʃt] | ноќ [noc] | night |
| раждам [raʒdam] | раѓам [raɟam] | give birth |

- Vowels: There are six vowels in Bulgarian, compared to five in Macedonian. While the schwa (ъ (/ɤ/) is part of standard Bulgarian phonology, its use in standard Macedonian is marginal. Nevertheless, the schwa is phonemic in a number of Macedonian dialects, e.g. the Northern Macedonian dialects, the Ohrid dialect, the Upper Prespa dialect, etc., while it is missing from the phonetic inventory of a number of Western Bulgarian dialects, e.g., the Elin Pelin dialect, Vratsa dialect, Samokov dialect. In other words, the difference is owing to a specific choice made during codification.

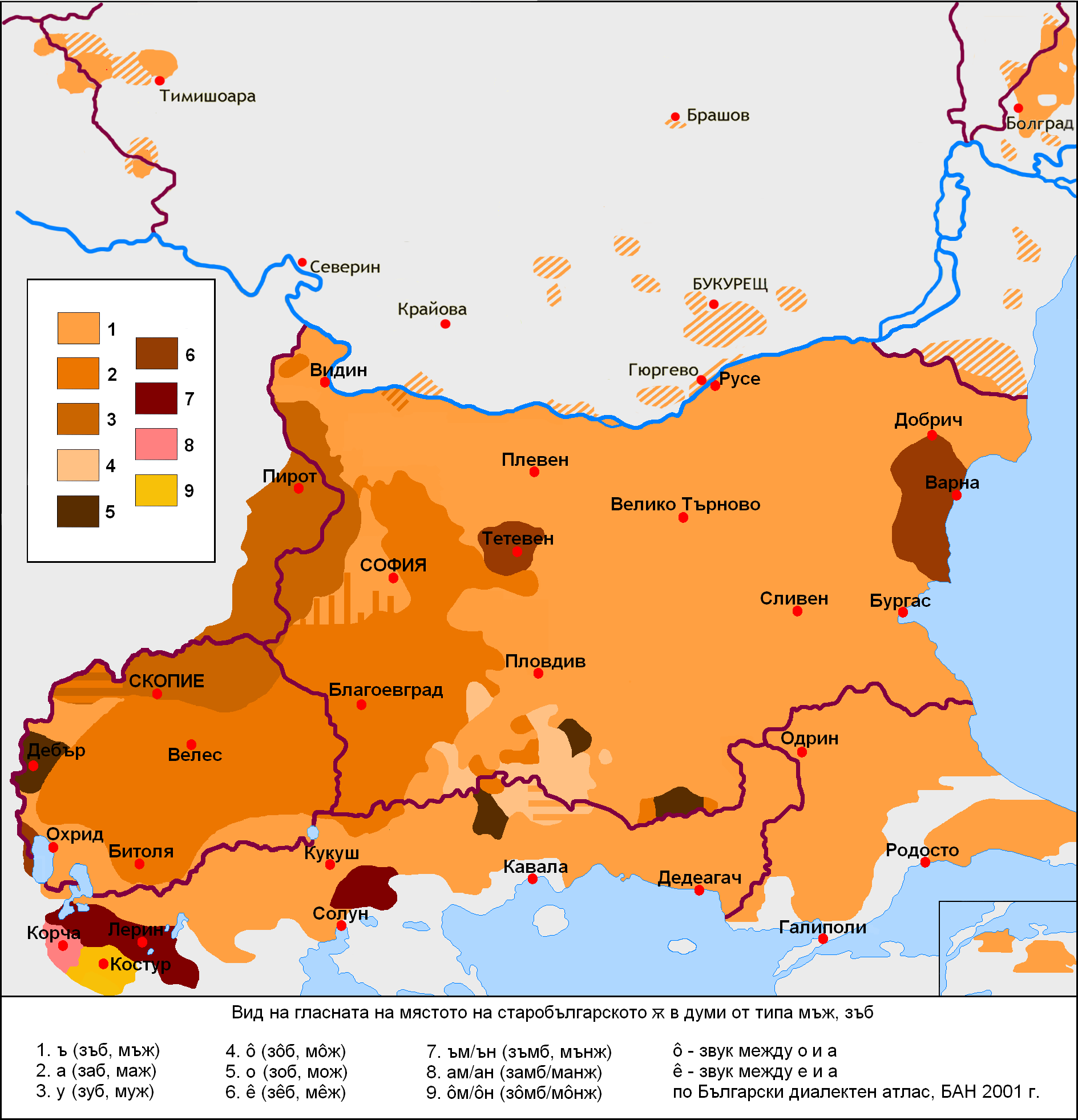
Map of the big yus (*ǫ) isoglosses in Eastern South Slavic and eastern Torlakian according to the Bulgarian Academy of Sciences' atlas from 2001. Pronunciation of man and tooth, derived from proto-words zǫbъ mǫžь on the map: 1. [mɤʃ], [zɤp] (see зъб and ząb); 2. [maʃ], [zap] (see заб); 3. [muʃ], [zup] (see зуб and zub); 4. /mɒʃ/, /zɒp/; 5. [mɔʃ], [zɔp] (see zob, mąż); 6. /mæʃ/, /zæp/ (see mężczyzna); 7. [mɤmʃ], [zɤmp]; 8. [mamʃ], [zamp]; 9. /mɒmʃ/, /zɒmp/ (see ząb)

The vowel schwa
| Bulgarian | Macedonian | English |
|---|---|---|
| път [pɤt] | пат [pat] | road |
| сън [sɤn] | сон [sɔn] | dream |
| България [bəɫˈɡarijə] | Бугарија [buˈɡaɾi(j)a] | Bulgaria |

- Loss of х [h] in Macedonian: The development of the Macedonian dialects since the 16th century has been marked by the gradual disappearance of the x sound or its replacement by в [v] or ф [f] (шетах [šetah] → шетав [šetav]), whereas standard Bulgarian, just like Old Bulgarian/Old Church Slavonic, has kept х in all positions. However, most Bulgarian dialects, except for the southern Rup dialects, have lost х in most positions, as well. The consonant was kept in the literary language for the sake of continuity with Old Bulgarian, i.e., the difference is again owing to a choice made during codification.

Consonant х [h]
| Macedonian | Bulgarian | English |
|---|---|---|
| убава [ubava] | хубава [hubava] | beautiful |
| снаа [snaa] | снаха [snaha] | daughter-in-law |
| бев [bev] | бях [byah] | I was |

- Hard and palatalized consonants: Many consonant phonemes in the Slavic languages come in "hard" and "soft" pairs. However, at present, only four consonants in Macedonian have a "soft pair": /k/-/kʲ/, /g/-/gʲ/, /n/-/nʲ/, /l/-/lʲ/ plus the stand-alone glide j. At the same time, the situation in Bulgarian is extremely unclear, with older phonology handbooks claiming that almost every consonant in Bulgarian has a palatalised equivalent, and newer research asserting that this palatalisation is very weak and that the so-called "palatal consonants" in the literary language are actually pronounced as a sequence of consonant + glide j. The reanalysis means that Bulgarian has only one palatal consonant, the semivowel j, which makes it the least palatal Slavic language.

Palatalization
| Bulgarian | Macedonian | English |
|---|---|---|
| бял [bʲa̟ɫ] or [bja̟ɫ] | бел [bɛɫ] | white |
| дядо [ˈdʲa̟do] or [ˈdja̟do] | дедо [ˈdɛdɔ] | grandfather |
| кестен [kɛstɛn] | костен [ˈkɔstɛn] | chestnut |

- The consonant group чр- [t͡ʃr-] in the beginning of the word, which was present in the Old Church Slavonic, predominantly was replaced with чер- in Bulgarian. In Macedonian this consonant group is replaced with цр-. There are examples that this process of replacing чр- with цр- was already happening in the 14th century in the Northern and Western Macedonian dialects.

The consonant group чр
| Macedonian | Bulgarian | English |
|---|---|---|
| цреша [ˈt͡srɛʃa] | череша [t͡ʃeˈrɛʃə] | cherry |
| црн [t͡sr̩n] | черен [ˈt͡ʃerɛn] | black |
| црта [ˈt͡sr̩ta] | черта [t͡ʃerˈta] | line |

=== Morphology ===
- Definite article: The Macedonian language has three definite articles pertaining to position of the object: unspecified, proximate (or close), and distal (or distant). All three have different gender forms, for masculine, feminine, and neuter nouns and adjectives. Bulgarian has only one definite article pertaining to unspecified position of the object. The difference is owing again to a choice made during codification: dialects in eastern North Macedonia have only one definite article, while there are dialects in Bulgarian that have triple definite article, such as the Tran dialect, Smolyan dialect, etc. Torlak dialects in Serbia also have triple definite article.

Definite article
| Position | Macedonian | Bulgarian | English |
|---|---|---|---|
| unspecified | собата | стаята | the room |
| proximate | собава | - | this room |
| distal | собана | - | that room |
| unspecified | собите | стаите | the rooms |
| proximate | собиве | - | this rooms |
| distal | собине | - | that rooms |

- Short and long definite articles: In Bulgarian, the masculine gender has two forms of definite articles: long (-ът, -ят) and short (-а, -я), depending on whether the noun has the role of subject or object in the sentence. The long form is used for a noun that's the subject of a sentence, while the short form is used for nouns that are direct/indirect objects. In Macedonian language, such a distinction is not made, and there is only the -от form for masculine nouns, besides, of course, the other two forms (-ов, -он) of the triple definite article.

Example:
Bulgarian
Професорът е много умен. -The professor is very smart. (The professor is a subject → long form -ът)
Видях професора. -I saw the professor. (The professor is a direct object → short form -а)
Macedonian
Професорот е многу паметен. -The professor is very smart.
Го видов професорот. -I saw the professor.

However, no Bulgarian dialect has both a short and a long definite article—all of them have either or. The rule is an entirely artificial construct suggested by one of the earliest Bulgarian men of letters, Neofit Rilski, himself from Pirin Macedonia, in an attempt to preserve the case system in Bulgarian. For more than a century, this has been one of the most reviled grammatical rules in Bulgarian and has consistently been described as artificial, unnecessary and snobbish.

- Demonstrative pronouns: Similar to the article, the demonstrative pronouns in the Macedonian standard language have three forms: for pointing close objects and persons (овој, оваа, ова, овие), distant objects and persons (оној, онаа, она, оние) and pointing without spatial and temporal determination (тој, таа, тоа, тие). There are only two categories in the Bulgarian standard language: closeness (този/тоя, тази/тая, това/туй, тези/тия) and distance (онзи/оня, онази/оная, онова/онуй, онези/ония). For pointing objects and persons without spatial and temporal determination are used the same forms for closeness.

Demonstrative pronouns
| | Speaker | close distance | without spatial and temporal determination | farther away |
|---|---|---|---|---|
| Macedonian | Го гледам | ова дете | тоа дете | она дете |
| Bulgarian | Виждам | това дете | това дете | онова дете |
| English | I see | this child | the child | that child |

- Plural with the suffix -иња [inja] for neuter nouns: In the standard Macedonian language, some neuter nouns ending in -e form the plural with the suffix -иња. In the Bulgarian language, neuter nouns ending in -e usually form the plural with the suffix -е(та) [-(e)ta] or -е(на) [-(e)na], and the suffix -иња does not exist at all.

Plural with the suffix -иња [inja]
| Macedonian | Bulgarian | English |
|---|---|---|
| море [more] мориња [morinja] | море [more] морета [moreta] | sea seas |
| име [ime] имиња [iminja] | име [ime] имена [imena] | name names |

- Present tense : Verbs of all three conjugations in Macedonian have unified ending -ам in 1st person singular: (пеам, одам, имам) for 1st person singular. In Bulgarian, 1st and 2nd conjugation use -а (-я): пея, ходя, and only 3rd conjugation uses - ам: имам.
- Past indefinite tense with има (to have): The standard Macedonian language is the only standard Slavic language in which there is a past indefinite tense (the so-called perfect), which is formed with the auxiliary verb to have and a verbal adjective in the neuter gender. This grammatical tense in linguistics is called have-perfect and it can be compared to the present perfect tense in English, Perfekt in German and passé composé in French. This construction of има with a verbal adjective also exists in some non-standard forms of the Bulgarian language, but it is not part of the standard language and is not as developed and widespread as in Macedonian.

Example: Гостите имаат дојдено. - The guests have arrived.

- Changing the root in some imperfect verb forms is characteristic only for the Bulgarian language. Like all Slavic languages, Macedonian and Bulgarian distinguish perfect and imperfect verb forms. However, in the Macedonian standard language, the derivation of imperfect verbs from their perfect pair takes place only with a suffix, and not with a change of the vowel in the root of the verb, as in the Bulgarian language.

Changing the root in some imperfect verb forms
| Bulgarian | Macedonian |
|---|---|
| отвори → отваря | отвори → отвора |
| скочи → скача | скокне → скока |
| изгори → изгаря | изгори → изгорува |

- Clitic doubling: Clitic doubling in the standard Macedonian language is always obligatory with definite direct and indirect objects, which contrasts with standard Bulgarian where clitic doubling is mandatory in a more limited number of cases. Non-standard dialects of Macedonian and Bulgarian have differing rules regarding clitic doubling.

Example: "I know that man."
Го познавам тој човек. (Macedonian)
Познавам този човек. (Bulgarian)

- Present active participle: All Slavic dialects in Bulgaria and Macedonia lost the Old Bulgarian present active participle ('сегашно деятелно причастие') in the Late Middle Ages. New Bulgarian readopted the participle from Church Slavonic in the 1800s, and it is currently used in the literary language. In spoken Bulgarian, it is replaced by a relative clause. Macedonian only uses a relative clause with the relative pronoun што.

Example:
Уплаших се от лаещите кучета. / Уплаших се от кучетата, които лаеха. - I was scared by the barking dogs./I was scared by the dogs that barked. (Bulgarian)
Се исплашив од кучињата што лаеја - I was scared by the dogs that barked. (Macedonian)

- Conditional mood: In Bulgarian it is formed by a special form of the auxiliary 'съм' (to be) in conjugated form, and the aorist active participle of the main verb, while in Macedonian it is formed with the unconjugated form 'би' (would), and the aorist active participle of the main verb.

Bulgarian
| person | gender and number | | | |
| person | m.sg. | f.sg. | n.sg. | pl. |
|---|---|---|---|---|
| 1st | бѝх чѐл | бѝх чѐла | (бѝх чѐло) | бѝхме чѐли |
| 2nd | бѝ чѐл | бѝ чѐла | (бѝ чѐло) | бѝхте чѐли |
| 3rd | бѝ чѐл | бѝ чѐла | бѝ чѐло | бѝха чѐли |

Macedonian
| person | gender and number | | | |
| person | m.sg. | f.sg. | n.sg. | pl. |
|---|---|---|---|---|
| 1st | би читал | би читала | би читало | би читале |
| 2nd | би читал | би читала | би читало | би читале |
| 3rd | би читал | би читала | би читало | би читале |

- Future-in-the-past: Both languages have this complex verb tense, but its formation differs.

In Bulgarian it is made up of the past imperfect of the verb ща (will, want) + the particle да (to) + the present tense of the main verb.

In Macedonian it is formed with the clitic ќе + imperfect of the verb.

Example (чета/чита, to read):

Bulgarian
| person | number | |
| person | sg. | pl. |
|---|---|---|
| 1st | щях да чета | щяхме да четем |
| 2nd | щеше да четеш | щяхте да четете |
| 3rd | щеше да чете | щяха да четат |

Macedonian
| person | number | |
| person | sg. | pl. |
|---|---|---|
| 1st | ќе читав | ќе читавме |
| 2nd | ќе читаше | ќе читавте |
| 3rd | ќе читаше | ќе читаа |

=== Vocabulary ===
A primary objective of Bulgarian men of letters in the 1800s was to restore the Old Church Slavonic/Old Bulgarian vocabulary that had been lost or replaced with Turkish or Greek words during Ottoman rule through the mediation of Church Slavonic. Thus, originally Old Bulgarian higher-style lexis such as безплътен (incorporeal), въздържание (temperance), изобретател (inventor), изтребление (annihilation), кръвопролитие (bloodshed), пространство (space), развращавам (debauch), създание (creature), съгражданин (fellow citizen), тщеславие (vainglory), художник (painter), was re-borrowed in the 1800s from Church Slavonic and Russian, where it had been adopted in the Early Middle Ages.

There are 12 phono-morpohological that point at the Old Bulgarian origin of a word in Church Slavonic or Russian:

- Use of the Bulgarian reflexes щ and жд for Pra-Slavic *tʲ/kt and *dʲ instead of the native Russian ones ч /tɕ/ and ж /ʑ/, e.g., заблуждать (mislead), влагалище (vagina);
- Replacement of East Slavic pleophonic -olo/-oro with -la/-ra. Thus, East Slavic forms such as голова (head) and город (city) exist side by side with Old Bulgarian главный (primary) and гражданин (citizen);
- Use of word-initial a, e, ю, ра and la, e.g., единовластие (absolutism) rather than одиноволостие, which would be the expected form based on East Slavic phonology, юность (youth), which replaced Old Russian ѹность, работа (work), which replaced Old Russian робота;
- Use of prefixes such as воз- and пре- instead of the native East Slavic вз- and пере-, e.g., воздержание (abstention) or преображать/преобразить (transform);
- Use of Old Bulgarian suffixes such as -тель, -тельность, -ствие, -енство, -ес, -ание, -ащий, -ущий, -айший, -ение, -ейший, e.g., благоденствие (prosperity), упражнение (exercise), пространство (space), стремление (aspiration), etc. etc. that can be traced back to use in Old Bulgarian manuscripts.
- Etc.

Nevertheless, none of this went without a problem. In the end, a number of Russified Old Bulgarisms replaced preserved native Old Bulgarisms, e.g., the Russified невежа and госпожа ("ignoramus" & "Madam") replaced the native невежда and госпожда, a number of other words were adopted with Russified phonology, e.g., утроба (O.B. ѫтроба, "uterus") rather than ътроба or вътроба, свидетел (O.B. съвѣдѣтель, "withness") rather than сведетел, началник (O.B. начѧльникъ, "superior") rather than начелник—which is what would have been expected given the phonetic development of the Bulgarian language, others had changed their meaning completely, e.g., опасно (O.B. опасьно) readopted in the meaning of "dangerously" rather than "meticulously", урок (O.B. ѹрокъ) readopted in the meaning of "lesson" rather than "condition"/"proviso", yet many, many others that ended up being Russian or Church Slavonic new developments on the basis of Old Bulgarian roots, suffixes, prefixes, etc.

Unlike Bulgarian which borrowed part of its linguistics from Russian, Macedonian has borrowed it mostly from Serbian.

== See also ==
- Slavic dialects of Greece
- Pomak language
- Shopi

== Bibliography ==
- Friedman, Victor (2001), Macedonian, SEELRC
