= Radožda =

Radožda Радожда
- Village
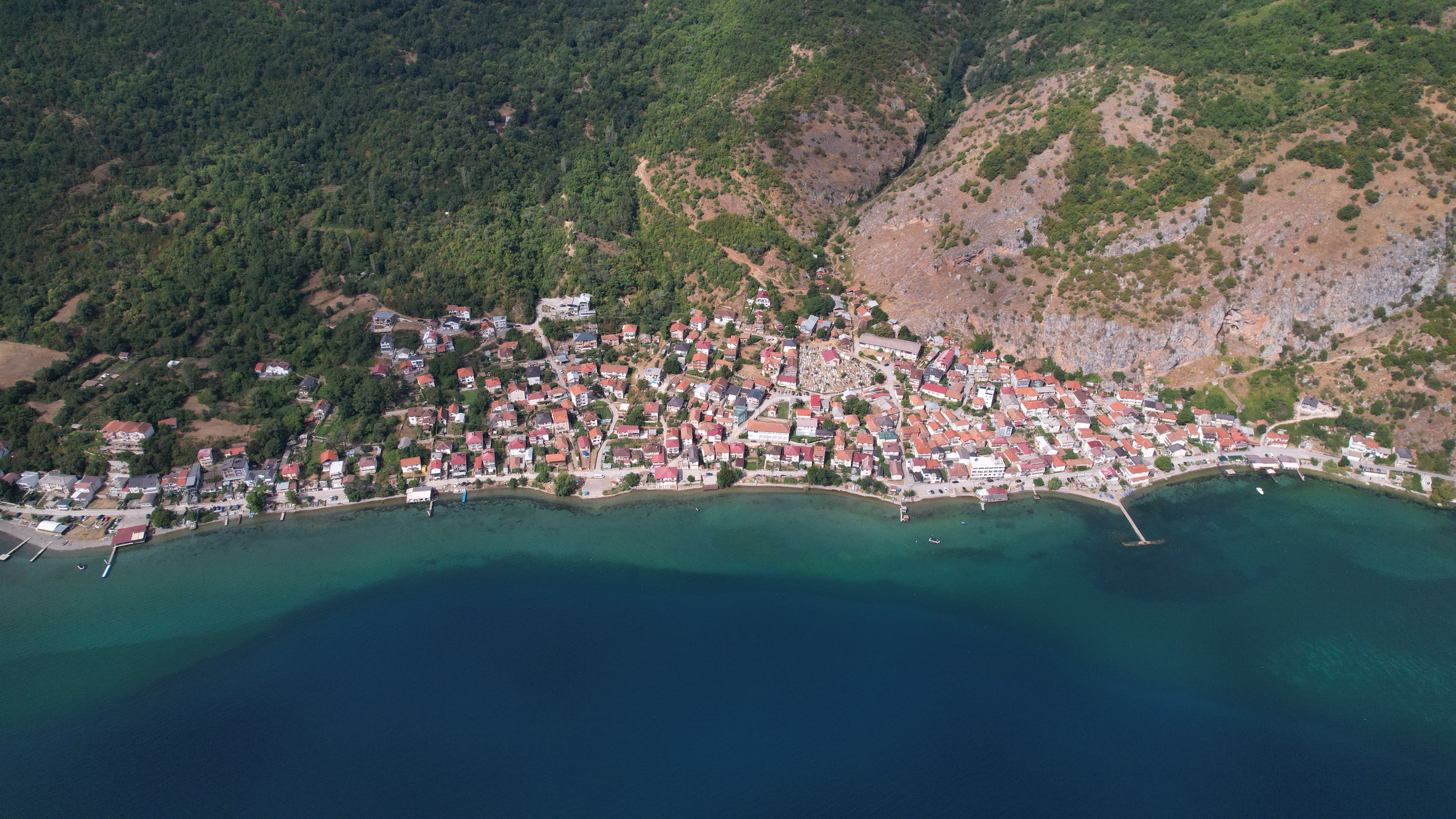
- Air view of the village

- Location within North Macedonia
- Coordinates: 41°6′14″N 20°37′59″E
- Country: North Macedonia
- Region: Southwestern
- Municipality: Struga

Population
  - Total: 808
- Time zone: UTC+1 (CET)
  - Summer (DST): UTC+2 (CEST)
- Area code: +389
- Car plates: SU

Radožda (Macedonian: Радожда [raˈdɔʒda]) is a village in the Struga municipality in the southwestern region of North Macedonia.

== Geography ==
Radožda is situated on the western shore of the Ohrid Lake. It is 10 km (6.2 mi) south of the town Struga. It is 2 km (1.2 mi) from the Macedonian-Albanian border crossing Qafë Thanë. The closest village is the village of Lin which is situated in Albania. The village is situated at 725 m (2,379 ft) above sea level.

== History ==
The village was founded on the western edge of the Ohrid Lake over ten centuries ago. It was founded in a fertile area which soon became accustomed to farming. The surrounding hinterland was suitable for small-scale agriculture and the area was settled. The village was founded approximately 1 km (0.62 mi) west of today's position.

=== Etymology ===
A document from the era of Tsar Stefan Dušan has the village listed under the name Radobužda (Радобужда). An Ottoman document from the year 1583 also records the village but under a different name Radohožda (Радохожда) while a hand written document from the Serbian Branislav Nušić has the village listed as Radooždž (Радоожџа) while Austrian-Hungarian maps have the village listed as Radoliožda, (Радолиожда) or Radohožda (Радохожда).

=== Saint Archangel Michael ===
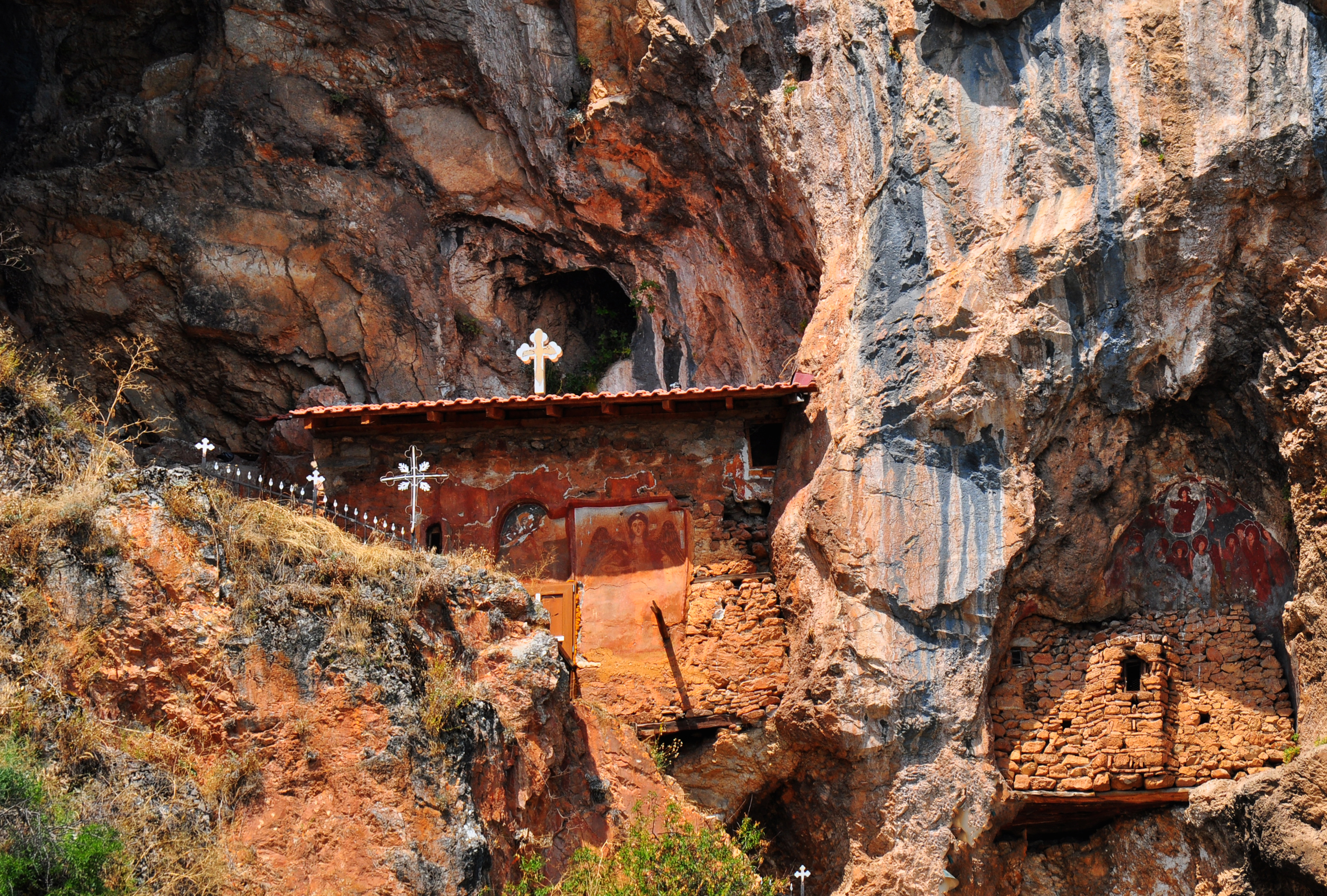
Exterior of the Church of Saint Archangel Michael.

The Church Saint Archangel Michael was built in the Jablanica mountain range above the village of Radožda in the 13th century. It was built in a natural cave and was dedicated to the military commander of the Bodiless Army - the Archangel Michael. Most of the frescoes date from the 14th century with one preserved from the 13th century. The cave church was repainted in the 14th thus removing many of the old frescoes. The top layer of painting in the church was the last accomplishment of the Ohrid Fine Art School from the 14th century.

== Demography ==
The 2002 census counted 808 people present in the village. Many of these residents were elderly as much of the current generation have left the village due to work and other reasons. The village is populated by ethnic Macedonians.

Ethnicity	Total
Macedonians	806
Serbs	1
Other	1

== Village festivals ==
The Village does not have any long standing traditions but there are some traditions specific to the village.

For Easter the villagers gather and go to all of Radožda's seven churches, the women trade dyed eggs, the villages light candles and they pray to God.

On 2 August the village celebrates Ilinden. The villages gather at the St Ilija Church and they trade holy bread, holy water while the villagers celebrate the glorious day. The whole village turns out to celebrate the event.

For the feast of the Assumption of Mary on 28 August many village people wait for guests from across the Struga and Ohrid areas. This is the biggest holy day in Radožda.

== Notable people ==
- Nikola Šećeroski (1934-2008)

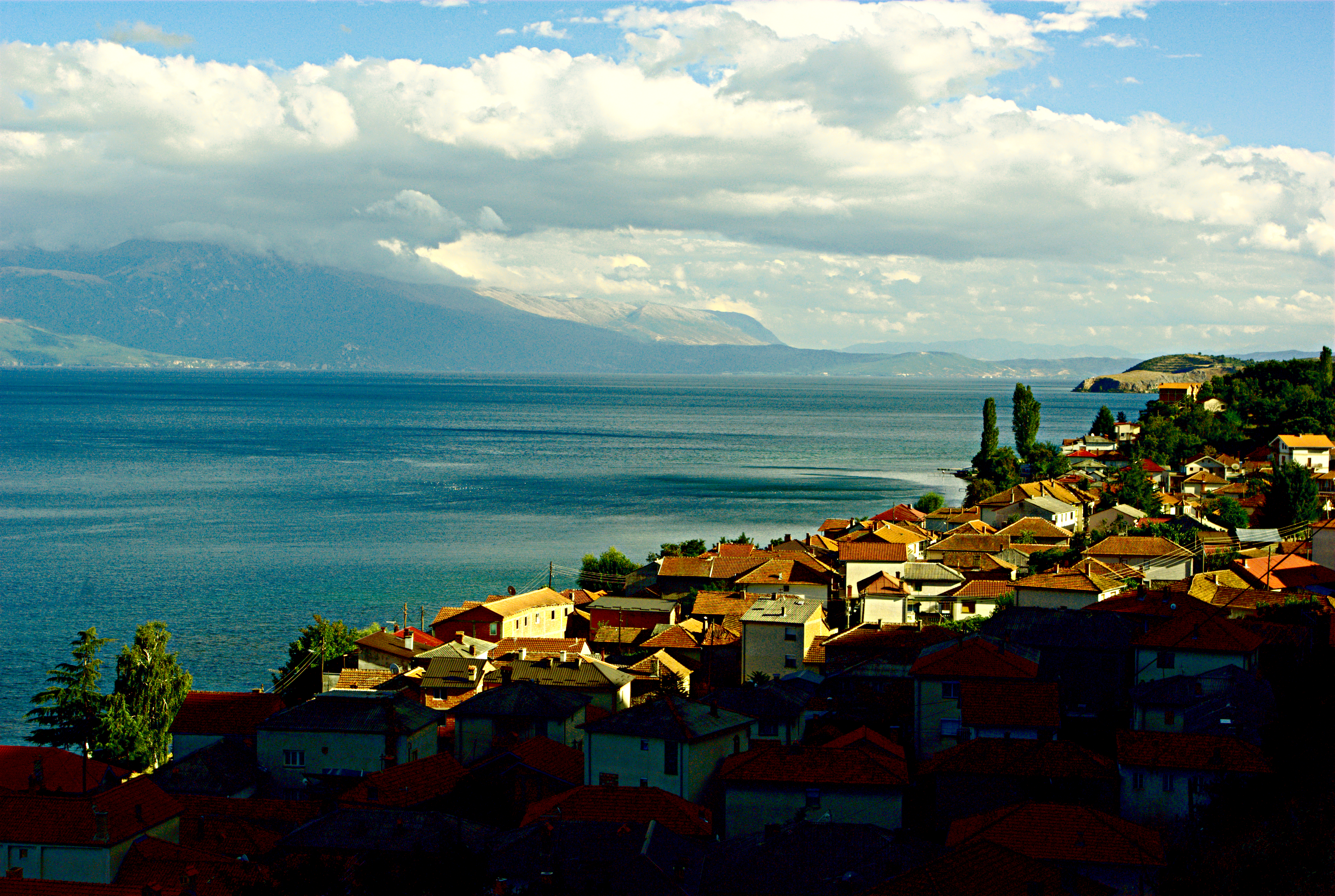
Radožda and Lake Ohrid

== See also ==
- Vevčani-Radožda dialect
- Lake Ohrid
- Kjafasan
- Struga
