= Lower Prespa dialect =

Dialect of Macedonian

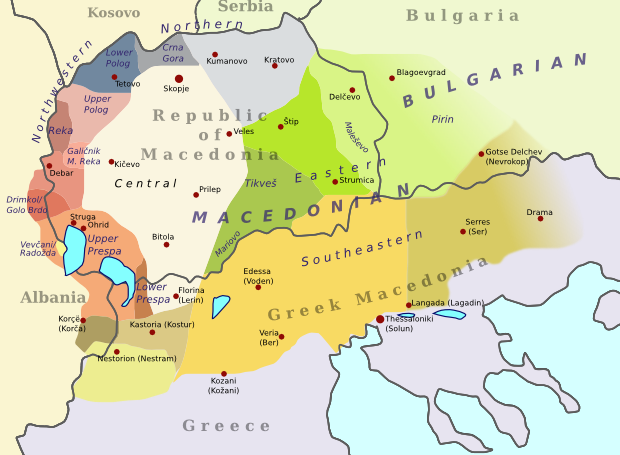
The location of the Lower Prespa dialect among the others Macedonian dialects

Remembering youth and wedding
Excerpt from the life story of an old woman from Shulin, Lower Prespa (in today's Korçë County, Albania) speaking in the Lower Prespa dialect

On the origin of the name Nivici
Excerpt from a man from Nivici, Mala Prespa (today Psarades, Florina regional unit, Greece) speaking in the Lower Prespa dialect

The Lower Prespa dialect (Macedonian: Долнoпреспански дијалект, Dolnoprespanski dijalekt), is a member of the western subgroup of the western group of dialects of Macedonian. This dialect is mainly spoken on the Eastern shore of Prespa Lake and Small Prespa Lake, both in North Macedonia and by Macedonian-speaking community on the Greek side of the border. The Prespa dialect spoken in the Greek community has elements of Greek such as "d/δ". This area is mainly composed of villages, such as Brajčino, Dupeni, Štrbovo, Ljubojno, western parts of the Florina regional unit and northern parts of the Kastoria regional unit. The Lower Prespa dialect is very similar to the Upper Prespa dialect and Ohrid dialect.

== Phonological characteristics ==
- use of e instead of yat: цена/cena 'price'
- use of palatal j
- use of ф/f and в/v instead of Old Church Slavonic х.

== Morphological characteristics ==
- use of the preposition od with possessive case: внукот од брат ми / vnukot od brat mi 'nephew through my brother'
- the plural suffix -ovi is often changed to the suffix -oj: лебови > лебој / lebovi > leboj 'bread'
- personal pronoun for third person singular and plural: тој, таа, тоа, тие / toj, taa, toa, tie 'he, she, it, they'
- shortening of words: Богројца/Bogrojca instead of Богородица/Bogorodica 'Virgin Mary', П'делник/P'delnik instead of Понеделник/Ponedelnik 'Monday'
- loss of v: Nivno > Nino, Nivna > Nina

== Typical words ==
- мисур/misur instead of чинија/chinija 'plate/dish'
- с'ти/s'ti instead of сите/site 'everyone'
- воа/voa instead of ова/ova 'this one'
- шо/šo instead of што/što 'what'
- как/kak instead of како/kako 'how'
- планучки/planučki instead of јагоди/jagodi 'strawberries'
- к'ртол/k'rtol instead of компир/kompir 'potato'
- даскал/daskal instead of учител/učitel 'teacher'
- луканец/lukanec instead of колбас/kolbas 'sausage'
- думан/duman instead of прашина/prašina 'dust'
- пепун/pepun instead of диња/dinja 'cantaloupe'
- пупки/pupki instead of ќофтиња/kjoftinja 'meatball'
- лафе/lafe instead of зборува/zboruva 'talk'
- зборва/zborva instead of зборува/zboruva 'talk'
- стори/stori instead of случи/sluči 'happen'
- заек/zaek instead of зајак/zajak 'rabbit'
- пули/puli instead of види//vidi 'look'
- ошче/ošče instead of уште/ušte 'still'
- каδе/kadhe instead of каде/kade 'where'
  - дека/deka or деа/dea is usually used instead of каде/kade 'where'

Some example phrases (in comparison to Standard Macedonian):

- Oti zborvaš kak taka? as opposed to Zošto zboruvaš kako taka? 'Why are you talking like that?'
- Šo ke se stori ako znaj toj? as opposed to Što ḱe se sluči ako znae toj? 'What's going to happen if he knows?'
- Kadhe oiš? as opposed to Kade odiš? 'Where are you going?'

== Examples ==
Below is written a popular folk song from the Prespa region. The song is in the Lower Prespa dialect.

Ozgora idat Turcite,
mladi Ljubanki teraat,
napred mi odi Todorka.

Todorke mlada nevesto,
ostavi si go deteto
na tie ravni ledini
na tie tenki kamenja.

Todorka poču turčinot
si go ostavi deteto
na tie ravni ledini.

Mi pominal ovčarče
pa si go zema deteto,
pa si go glavil sluginče
kaj edna mlada vdovica.
kaj toj mi Osman Beg.

Devet mi godidi sluguval,
liceto ne i go videl
na taa mlada vdovica.

Poduvnal veter gornjaneni
i go duvnal feredžeto,
liceto i se otkrilo,
liceto na vdovicata.

I togaš si ovčarče zagrabil,
majčice mila majčice,
deka sisluguvaše devet godini
vo taa crna zandana.

Ah milo moje detence,
deka rasteše devet godini
vo tie crni zandani.

Togaš si majka zagrnal,
zaklal si turčin na guša
i kuḱa si napravil
so tie pari od sluguvanje

== Literature ==
- Шклифов, Бл. Долнопреспанският говор. -В: Трудове по българска диалектология. Т. 11. София: Изд. на БАН, 1979. (Shklifov, Bl. Dolnoprespanskiyat govor. -V: Trudove po balgarska dialektologiya. T. 11. Sofia: Izd. na BАN, 239 s.)
