= Vevčani-Radožda dialect =

Dialect of Macedonian

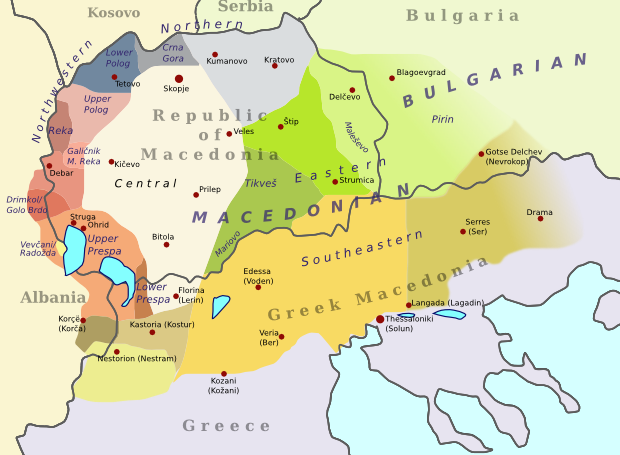
The location of the Vevčani-Radožda dialect among the others Macedonian dialects

The Lazy Bride
Excerpt from a folk story told by a woman from Vevčani in the Vevčani-Radožda dialect

Traditions for Lazarus Saturday in Vevčani
Excerpt old woman from Vevčani about the village traditions around Lazarus Saturday told in the Vevčani-Radožda dialect

The Vevčani-Radožda dialect (Macedonian: Вевчанско-радошки дијалект, Vevčansko-radoški dijalekt) is a member of the western and north western subgroup of the western group of dialects of Macedonian. Because of the old and rich tradition that this region has and because of the Vevčani Carnival, many old words are present in everyday communication of the people. The Vevčani-Radοžda dialect is the smallest dialect among the other dialects of Macedonian.

The dialect is spoken in the villages of Radožda, Vevčani, Mali Vlaj in North Macedonia and the village of Lin in Albania. The dialect is close with the Struga, Korča, and Ohrid dialects.

== Phonological characteristic ==
- change of word-initial /tsv/ (цв-) to /tsu/ (цу): цвет → цут / cvet → cut 'flower'
- loss of intervocalic /v/ (в): половина → полојна / polovina → polojna 'half'
- stress falls on the third syllable from the end of the word.
- use of intervocalic o instead of a

== Morphological characteristic ==
- use of the suffix -уле / -ule: дете → детуле / dete → detule 'kid';
- use of the preposition в / во 'in': во вода, в град / vo voda, v grad 'in water', 'in city';
- use of the suffix -т: тој пишит / toj pišit 'he writes';
- frequent use of the perfect construction е дојден, беше дојден / e dojden, beše dojden 'is come', 'was come'.
- change of (ќ) /kj/ to (шт) /št/ : гаќи /gakji/ → гашти /gašti/

== Other specific characteristics ==
- change of the vocal R and vocal L;
- often use of the consonant groups шт (št) and жд (žd)
- using vocal groups such as: -ea-, -oa- .

== Typical words ==
- Пипун/pipun as opposed to диња/dinja 'cantaloupe'
- Риза/riza as opposed to крпа/krpa 'towel'
- Карпуз/karpuz as opposed to лубеница/lubenica 'watermelon'
- Момиче/momiče as opposed to мома/moma 'girl'
- Иљачи/iljači as opposed to лекови/lekovi 'medicines'
- Гашти/eašti as opposed to гаќи/gaķi 'underwear'
- Кнок/knok as opposed to слаб/slab 'thin/skinny'
- Јаболце/jabolce as opposed to капаче/kapače 'kneecap'
- Фшинат/fšinat as opposed to шинат/šinat 'to sprain'

== See also ==
- The Radožda-Vevčani Dialect of Macedonian: Structure, Texts, Lexicon
