= Struga dialect =

Dialect of Macedonian

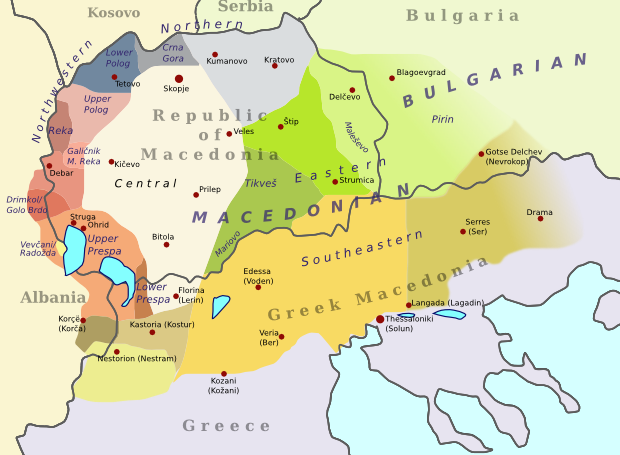
The location of the Struga dialect among the others Macedonian dialects

The Struga Dialect (Macedonian: Струшки дијалект, Struški dijalekt) is a member of the western and north western subgroup of the western group of dialects of Macedonian. The dialect is spoken in Struga, Pogradec, Pustec, and up to the Golo Brdo and in the surrounding hinterland. The dialect has many similarities with the Vevčani-Radožda, Ohrid and Korča dialects.

== Phonological characteristics ==
- change of word-initial /tsv/ (цв-) to /tsu/ (цу): цвет → цут / cvet → cut 'flower'
- loss of intervocalic /v/ (в): право → прао / pravo → prao 'straight ahead'
- loss of intervocalic /ɡ/ (г): сега → сеа / sega → sea 'now'
- loss of intervocalic /d/ (д): одиме → оиме or ојме / odime → ojme 'we go'
- merger of /c/ (ќ) with /t͡ʃ/ (ч): ќе → че 'will'
- merger of /ɟ/ (ѓ) with /d͡ʒ/ (џ): луѓе → луџе 'people'

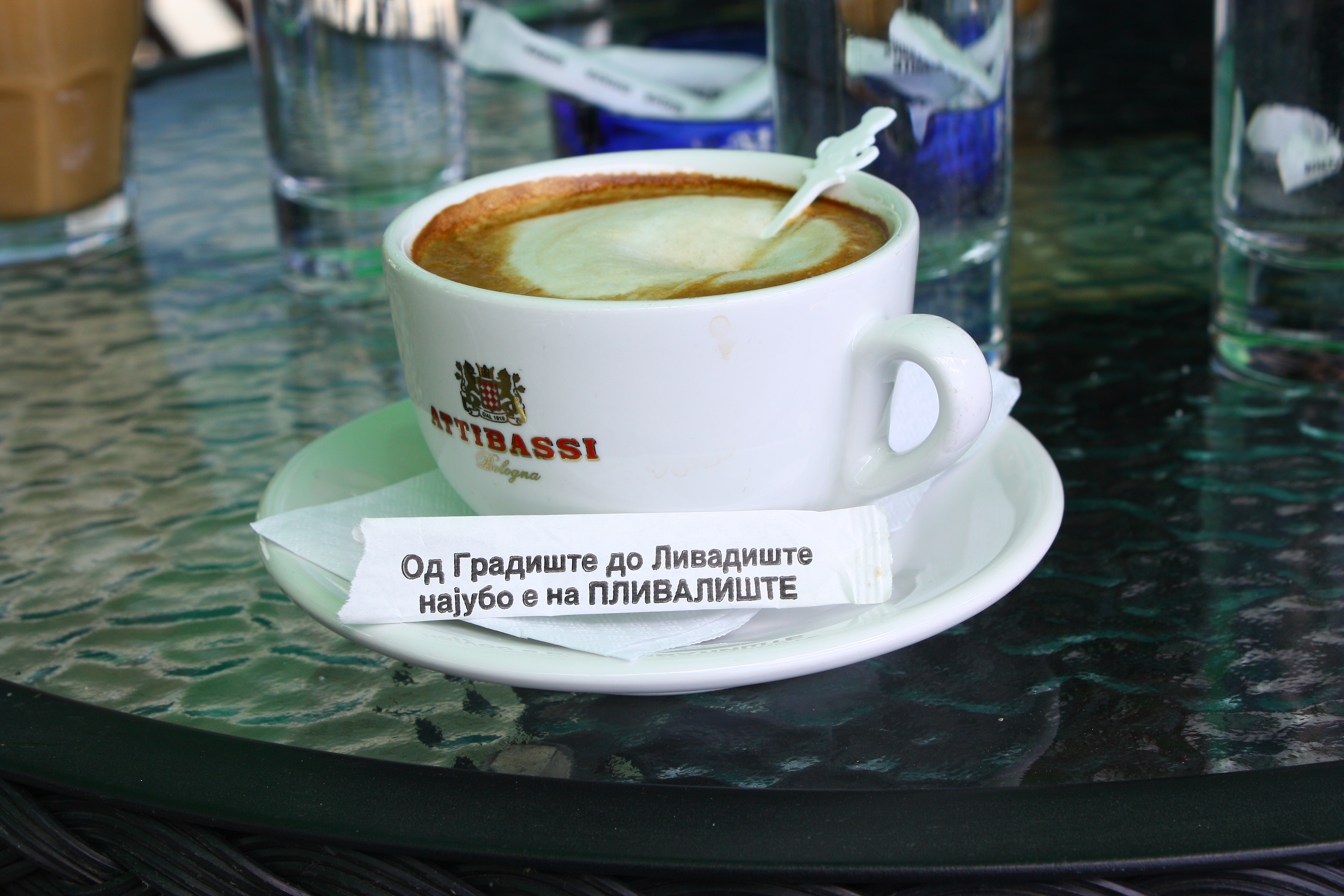
Macchiato in Struga with inscription in local dialect

== Morphological characteristics ==
- use of the suffix -иче / -iče: мома → момиче / moma → momiče 'kid'
- use of the preposition в/во 'in': во вода, в град / vo voda, v grad 'in water', 'in city'
- use of the suffix -т: тој пишит / toj pišit 'he writes'
- frequent use of the perfect construction: е дојден, беше дојден / e dojden, beše dojden, literally 'is come', 'was come'.
- replacement of the consonant з/z with г/g: влезиме → влегваме / vlezime → vlegvame 'we enter'
- use of the suffix- ка/-ka: јас → јаска / jas → jaska 'I/me'

== Other specific characteristics ==
- change of vocalic r and vocalic l
- using vowel groups such as -ea-, -oa-

== Typical words ==
- Пипун/pipun as opposed to диња/dinja 'cantaloupe'
- Риза/riza as opposed to крпа/krpa 'towel'
- Кондури/konduri as opposed to чевли/čevli 'shoes'
- Карпуз/karpuz as opposed to лубеница/lubenica 'watermelon'
- Момиче/momiče as opposed to девојче/devojche 'young/little girl'
- Пљачки/pljački as opposed to алишта/ališta 'clothes'
- Гужва/gužva as opposed to народ/narod 'people/crowd'
- Блеблеби/bleblebi as opposed to леблеби/leblebi 'chickpeas'
- Губа/guba as opposed to мазник/maznik 'pastry'

=== Typical sayings ===
- Не Биди енајџиа ко Нестора/Ne bidi enajdžija ko Nestora 'Don't be a pain like Nestor'
- Како Струга нема друга!/Kako Struga nema Druga! 'There is no place like Struga.'

== Example of the dialect ==
The Child from the Land Above
Excerpt from a folk fairy tale told by an old woman from Mali Vlaj in the Struga dialect

Момето одит на езерото

Момето одит на езерото
да ми налеит бисерна вода.
Две ведра в раце, ведро на глава
да му измие беќару ноѕе
да му измиет, дур' до колена,
да му избришет со бела риза.

Момето одит на езерото
да ми налеит бисерна вода,
да му измиет беќару лице
да му избришет со ал шамија.

Момето одит на езерото
да ми налеит бела вода.
да му измиет беќару раце
беќару раце дур' до рамена,
да му избришет сос бело чевре.
