= Upper Prespa dialect =

Dialect of Macedonian

The spread Upper-Prespa dialect

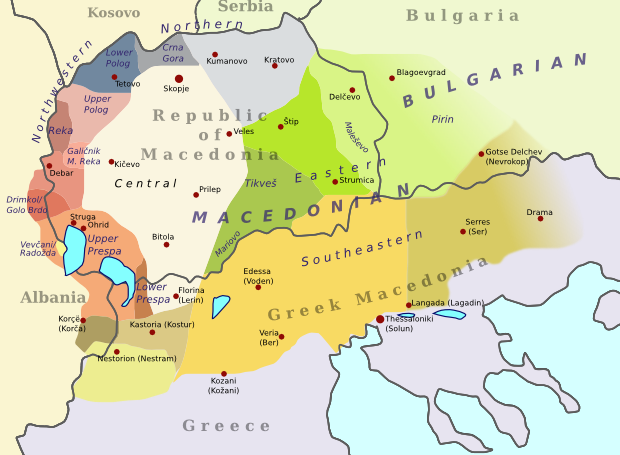
The location of the Upper Prespa dialect among the others Macedonian dialects

The Upper Prespa dialect (Macedonian: Горнопреспански дијалект, Gornoprespanski dijalekt) is a member of the western subgroup of the western group of dialects of Macedonian. The dialect is spoken in the town of Resen and surrounding areas. The Upper Prespa dialect is very similar to the Lower Prespa dialect and the Ohrid dialect.

== Morphological characteristics ==
- use of the suffix -ој instead of -ови in plurals
- use of all three definite articles
