= Ohrid dialect =

Dialect of Macedonian

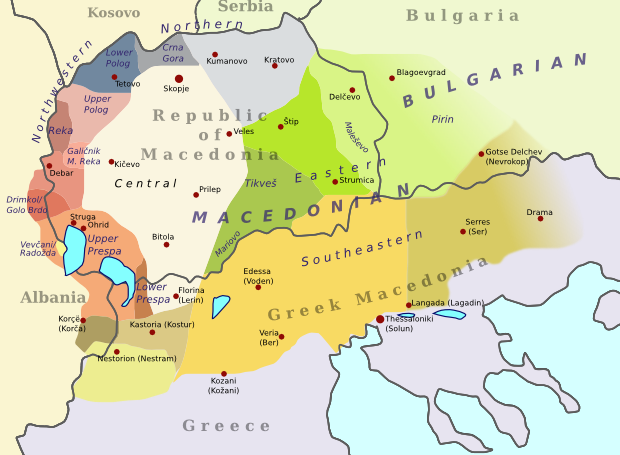
The location of the Ohrid dialect among the other Macedonian dialects

The Ohrid dialect (Macedonian: Охридски дијалект, Ohridski dijalekt) is a member of the western and north western subgroup of the western group of dialects of the Macedonian language. The dialect is spoken in the region around the city Ohrid, North Macedonia up to the southern point of the Ohrid Lake. Except in the city of Ohrid, the dialect is spoken in the villages Trpejca, Peštani, Elešec, Velgoshti and many others smaller villages in that area. This dialect is known among the Macedonians as a dialect of extensive use of the suffix -t and to some extent shortening of the words. The Ohrid dialect is also part of the Macedonian literature, especially with the works of Grigor Prličev with his Biography, Skenderbeg and Serdarot. The Ohrid dialect is closely related with the nearby city Struga and Upper Prespa dialects.

== Phonological characteristics ==
The extent of the Ohrid dialect

- shortening of words: братучед / bratučed → брачед / bračed ('cousin');
- absence of intervocalic /v/;
- use of the consonant groups št and žd;
- use of the cu- instead of the consonant group cv-: цвет / cvet → цут / cut ('flower').

== Morphological characteristics ==
- use of the suffix -t for third-person singular;
- use of the preposition vo, v;
- loss of the suffix -m in first-person singular;
- use of dative forms;
- the Old Church Slavonic /x/ is replaced by /v/.

== Examples of the dialect ==
Comparing life of young people today to the olden days
Excerpt from speech by an old man from the Kaneo (Varoš) neighbourhood of Ohrid

About the hard life of the fishmongers
Excerpt from speech of an old woman from Trpejca, Ohrid region

"...Da vi kaža i drugo: Opisanata vo Armatolos Neda ne e druga ocvan majka, i nejzinoto snovidenie - majčino mi snovidenie. Tolku e verno oti majčinata ljubov pomaga i vo spisanijata..." - Autobiography by Grigor Prličev
