= Bozveli =

Bozveli may refer to:

- Bozveli Peak, peak in the Antarctic Peninsula
- Neofit Bozveli (1785-1848), Bulgarian cleric
