= Hilarion of Lovech =

Bulgarian Eastern Orthodox bishop (1800–1884)

His Holiness Hilarion
- Bulgarian Exarch
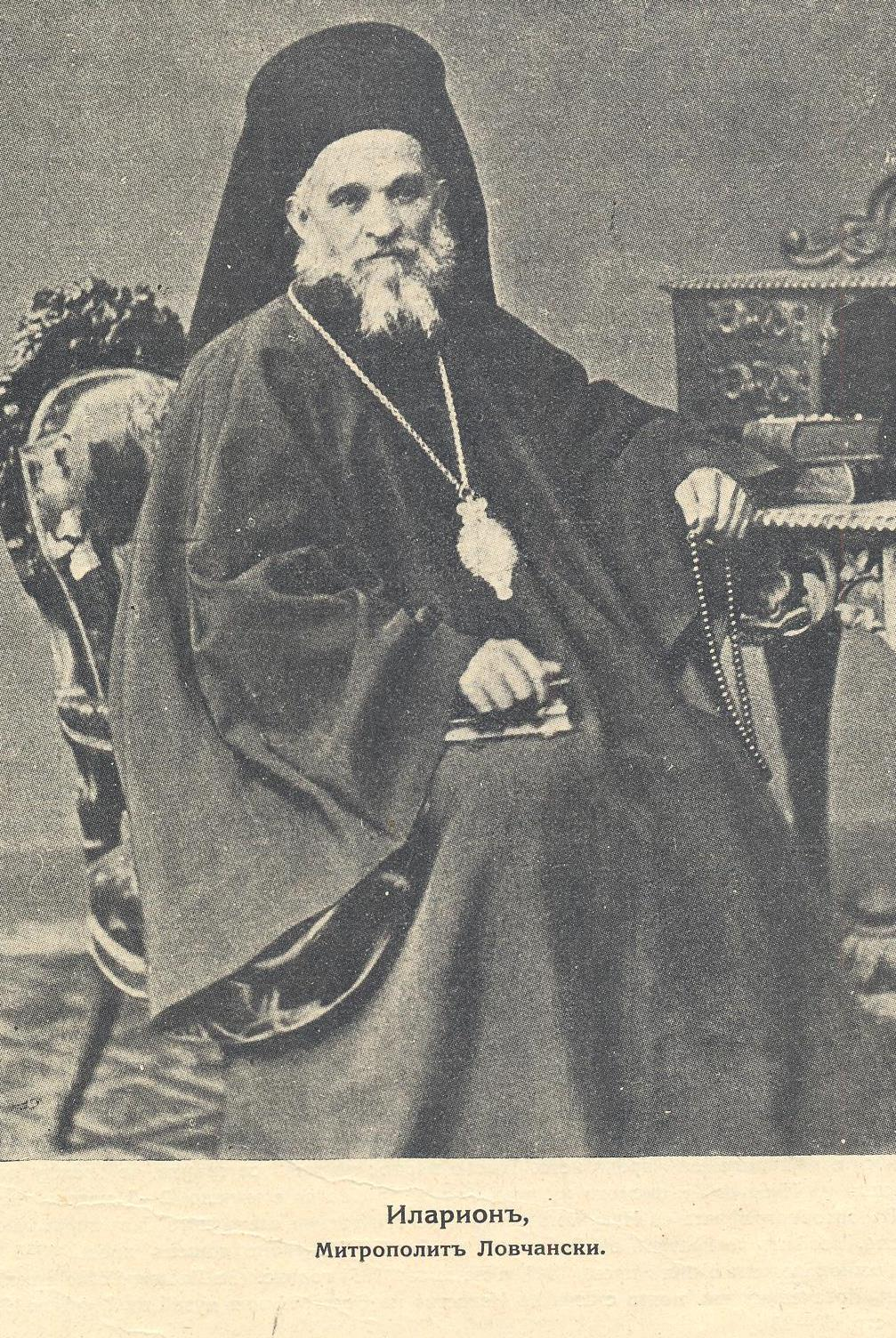
- Church: Bulgarian Orthodox Church (Bulgarian Exarchate)
- See: Constantinople
- Installed: 12 February 1872
- Term ended: 16 February 1872
- Predecessor: Position established
- Successor: Anthim I
- Other posts: Bishop of Lovech (1852–1872); Metropolitan of Kyustendil (1872–1884)
- Previous posts: Bishop of Axioupoli (1850–1852)

Orders
- Ordination: 1819
- Consecration: 1850 by Neophytos (Byzantios)

Personal details
- Born: Ivan Ivanov; 1800 Gorni Chukani (Elena), Ottoman Bulgaria
- Died: 31 January 1884 (aged 83–84) Kyustendil, Principality of Bulgaria
- Buried: Kyustendil Cathedral
- Denomination: Eastern Orthodox Church

Hilarion of Lovech (Bulgarian: Иларион Ловчански; secular name: Ivan Ivanov; Bulgarian: Иван Иванов; 1800 – 31 January 1884) was a Bulgarian Orthodox bishop.

== Biography ==
He received his primary education at the Monastery of St. Nicholas in Kapinovo near Veliko Tarnovo, where he was an obedient monk from the age of ten, and at nineteen he was ordained a hierodeacon. He served at the Tarnovo Cathedral; as the Eparchy of Veliko Tarnovo was then staffed exclusively with bishops of Greek nationality, he learned the Greek language. Before 1849, he became an archimandrite, and in 1850, he was consecrated auxiliary bishop of the Eparchy of Veliko Tarnovo with the title of Bishop of Axioupoli. The chirotony took place in the Church of Saint Demetrius of Thessaloniki in Arbanasi.

In 1852, following requests from the faithful of the Eparchy of Lovech to send a Bulgarian bishop to the local cathedra, he was appointed to that position. From 1856, he also served as Bishop of Veliko Tarnovo. He became involved in the Bulgarian national revival and the struggle for the restoration of the autocephalous Bulgarian Church. In 1860, he supported the gesture of Bishop Hilarion of Makariopolis, who, during Easter service, intentionally did not mention the name of Cyril VII, the Ecumenical Patriarch of Constantinople; according to the canon law, this was an act of throwing off the patriarch's authority. Despite this, in 1868 a dispute arose between the bishop and the faithful of the Eparchy of Lovech, as a result of which Hilarion left Lovech and settled in Constantinople.

In 1870, Imperial Russian ambassador to the Ottoman Empire Nikolay Ignatyev convinced Sultan Abdulaziz to issue a firman sanctioning the establishment of the Bulgarian Exarchate (an autonomous structure subordinate to the Ecumenical Patriarchate of Constantinople, not a separate Orthodox Church) in the lands inhabited by Bulgarian people. The Eparchy of Lovech found itself within its borders. During the council that announced the establishment of the Exarchate, Bishop Hilarion presided over its Provisional Synod, as the oldest hierarch in the council. Two years later, he was elected by the Church–People's Council as Exarch, but his candidacy was not approved by the Sultan. According to another source, Hilarion, for political reasons and due to his advanced age, refused the office, simultaneously resigning from the Lovech cathedra. Anthim I, metropolitan of the Eparchy of Vidin, was then elected head of the Exarchate.

In June 1872 he became metropolitan of the Eparchy of Kyustendil and remained in this cathedra until his death in 1884. He was buried in the vestibule of the Kyustendil Cathedral.
