= Second Vidin Collection =

The second collection of Vidin ("Stories and Reflections") is a compilation of fables and moral teaching stories compiled by Sophronius of Vratsa in Vidin in 1802. The book is made up of 377 pages. It consists of 79 sermons with an ecclesiastical teaching Christian content that is edifying.

Although unpublished, it has had a significant impact on Bulgarian literature over the coming decades, with the genre of short didactic forms further developed by authors such as Petar Beron, Neofit Bozveli, Neofit Rilski, Rayno Popovich, Konstantin Ognyanovich.
