= Bulgarian Exarchate =

Official name of the Bulgarian Orthodox Church (1870–1953)

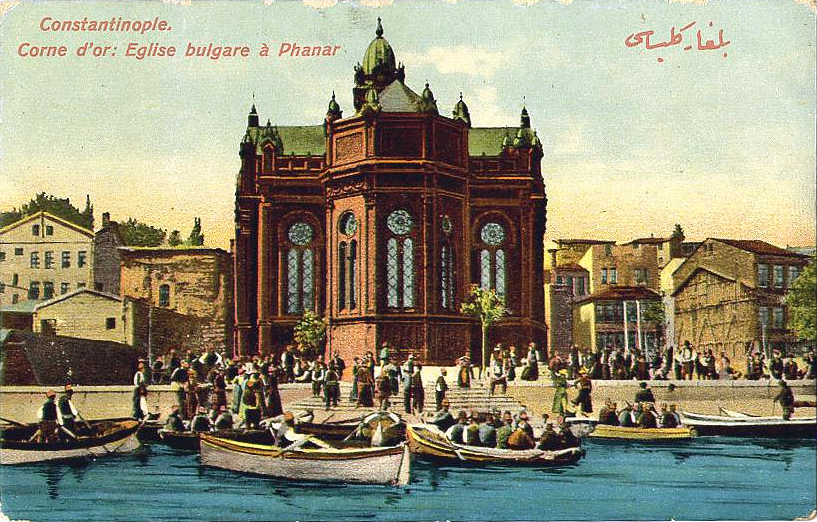
An early-20th-century postcard depicting the Bulgarian St. Stephen Church in Balat, Constantinople.

The Bulgarian Exarchate (Bulgarian: Българска екзархия, romanized: Balgarska ekzarhiya; Turkish: Bulgar Eksarhlığı) was the official name of the Bulgarian Orthodox Church before its autocephaly was recognized by the Ecumenical See in 1945 and the Bulgarian Patriarchate was restored in 1953.

The Exarchate (a de facto autocephaly) was unilaterally (without the blessing of the Ecumenical Patriarch) decreed by the Ottoman Empire on 23 May [O.S. 11 May] 1872, in the Bulgarian church in Constantinople in pursuance of the 12 March [O.S. 28 February] 1870 firman of Sultan Abdulaziz.

The foundation of the Exarchate was the direct result of the actions of the most extreme Bulgarian nationalists under leadership of Dragan Tsankov, himself a Catholic, against the authority of the Greek Patriarchate of Constantinople in the 1850s and 1860s. In 1872, the Patriarchate was forced to declare that the Exarchate introduced ethno-national characteristics in the religious organization of the Orthodox Church, and the secession from the Patriarchate was officially condemned by the Council in Constantinople in September 1872 as schismatic. Nevertheless, Bulgarian religious leaders continued to extend the borders of the Exarchate in the Ottoman Empire by conducting plebiscites in areas contested by both Churches.

In this way, in the struggle for recognition of a separate Church, the modern Bulgarian nation was created under the name Bulgarian Millet.

== National awakening ==
In 1762, Saint Paisius of Hilendar (1722–1773), a monk from the south-western Bulgarian town of Bansko, wrote Istoriya Slavyanobolgarskaya ("History of the Slav-Bulgarians"), a short historical work which was also the first ardent call for a national awakening. In History of Slav-Bulgarians, Paisius urged his compatriots to throw off subjugation to the Greek language and culture. The example of Paisius was followed by others, including Saint Sophroniy of Vratsa (1739–1813), Abbot Spiridon Gabrovski (died 1824), Abbot Yoakim Karchovski (died 1820), and Abbot Kiril Peychinovich (died 1845).

=== Struggle for church autonomy ===
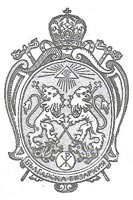
The Coat of arms of the Bulgarian Exarchate

The result of the work of Paisius and his followers began before long to give fruit. Discontent with the supremacy of the Greek clergy started to flare up in several Bulgarian dioceses as early as the 1820s.

It was not, however, until the 1850 that the Bulgarians initiated a purposeful struggle against the Greek clerics in a number of bishoprics demanding their replacement with Bulgarian ones as well as other changes such as the use of Bulgarian in liturgy and fixed salaries for bishops. By that time, most Bulgarian religious leaders had realised that any further struggle for the rights of the Bulgarians in the Ottoman Empire could not succeed unless they managed to obtain at least some degree of autonomy from the Patriarchate of Constantinople.

As the Ottomans identified nationality (ethnicity) with confession and the majority of ethnic Bulgarians were Orthodox Christians, they were automatically included in the Rūm millet, a community ruled immediately by the Ecumenical Patriarch in his capacity of millet-bashi and dominated by Phanar Greeks (Phanariots). Thus, if the Bulgarians wanted to have Bulgarian schools and liturgy in Bulgarian, they needed an autonomous ecclesiastical organisation.

The struggle between the Bulgarians, led by Neofit Bozveli and Ilarion Stoyanov, and the Phanariotes intensified throughout the 1860s. As the Greek clerics were ousted from most Bulgarian bishoprics at the end of the decade, the whole of northern Bulgaria, as well as the northern parts of Thrace and Macedonia had, to all intents and purposes, seceded from the Patriarchate.

== Establishment of the Bulgarian Exarchate ==
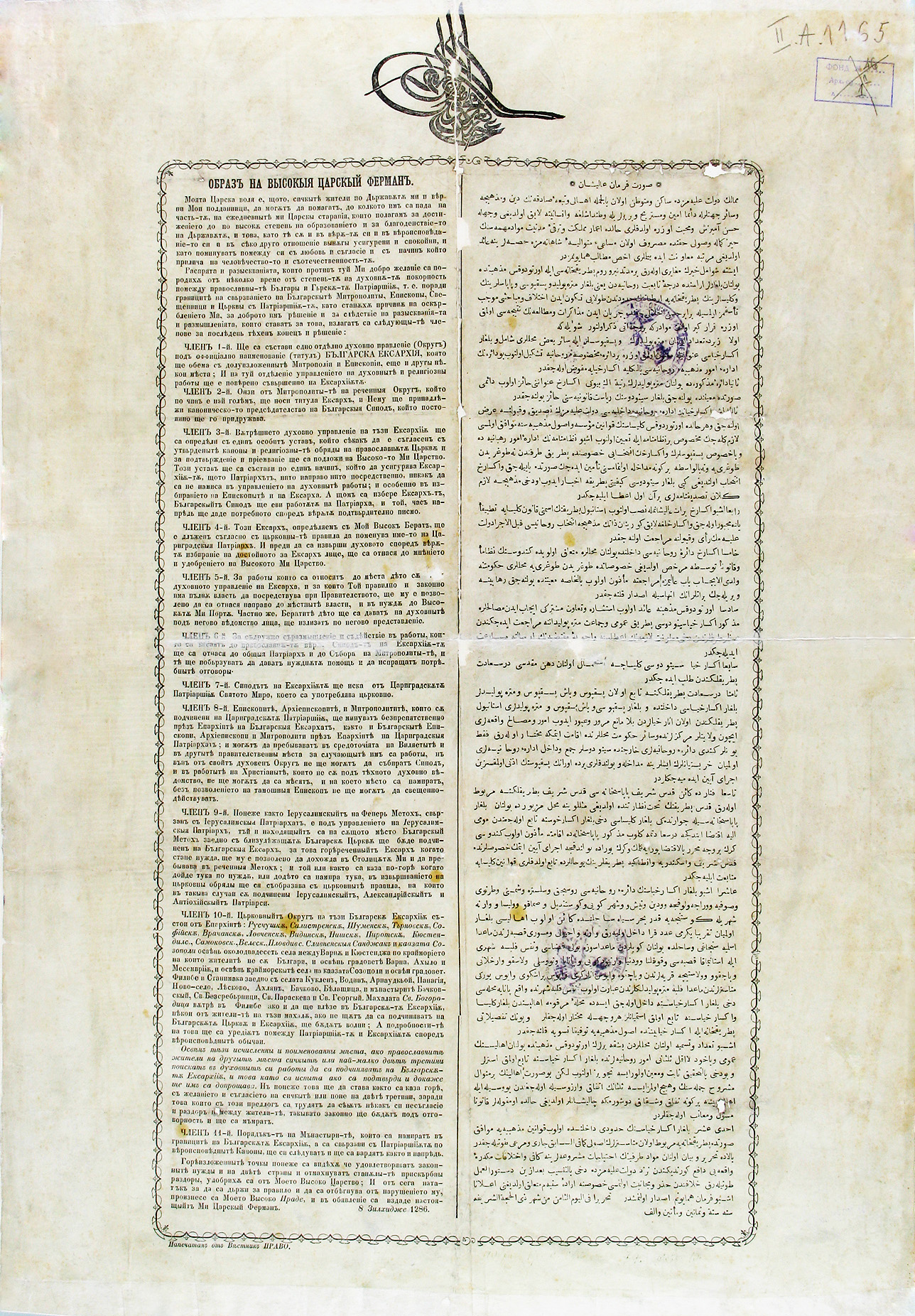
Firman of Sultan Abdülaziz for the establishment of the Bulgarian Exarchate, February 27, 1870.

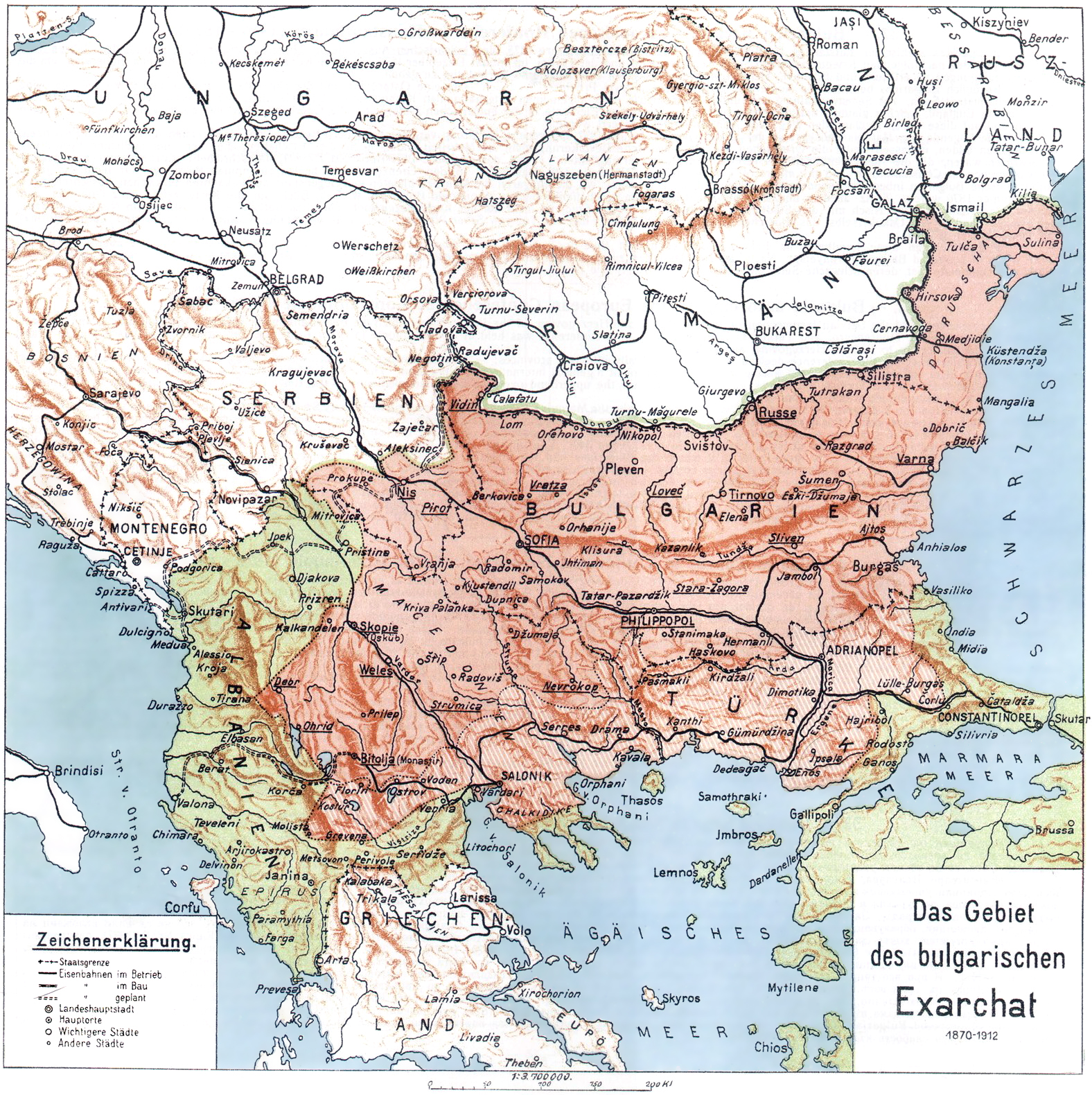
Map of the Bulgarian Exarchate (1870–1913).

In seeking to calm down the disturbances, the Ottoman government of the Sultan Abdülaziz granted the right to establish an autonomous Bulgarian Exarchate for the dioceses of Bulgaria as well as those, wherein at least two-thirds of Orthodox Christians were willing to join it, by issuing the Sultan's firman promulgated on 12 March [O.S. 28 February] 1870. The firman envisaged a broad autonomy of the Exarchate but would leave it under the supreme canonical authority of the Ecumenical See, i.e. not full autocephaly.

The Exarchate's borders went on to extend over present-day northern Bulgaria (Moesia), most of Thrace, as well as over north-eastern Macedonia. After the Christian population of the bishoprics of Skopje and Ohrid voted in 1874 overwhelmingly in favour of joining the Exarchate (Skopje by 91%, Ohrid by 97%) the Bulgarian Exarchate became in control of the whole of Macedonia (Vardar and Pirin Macedonia). The Exarchate was also represented in the whole of Greek Macedonia and the Vilayet of Adrianople by vicars. Thus, the borders of the Exarchate included all Bulgarian districts in the Ottoman Empire.

The process of constituting the Exarchate as legal institution was important part of nation-building process. A meeting of the Bulgarian leaders in Constantinople chaired by Gavril Krastevich is convened on March 13, 1870 to elect ten civil members of the Temporary church council. The council includes also the six Bulgarian bishops which constitute the Exarchate's Synod. The role of newly found council have been to create draft for the Exarchate's Statute, which prescribes the inner administrative order of the Bulgarian autocephalous church. Over the next ten months, the council have discussed ideas about Exarchate's Statue. During the discussions two political camps emerged. The ″liberal-democratic″ camp included Petko Slaveykov, Todor Ikonomov and Stoyan Chomakov which argued about priority of democratic and representative functions of the Exarchate. From their point of view, civil members of the Exarchate's institutions should lead conduction of administrative functions, outside of strictly religious practices. The ″conservative″ camp argued about keeping strict church hierarchy in Exarchate's activities, pleaded for strict following of Orthodox traditions and insisted on more institutional powers based on the Exarch figure. Representatives of ″conservative″ camp were P.V. Odjakov and Ilarion Makariopolski. This political discussion continued ideological opposition between ″young″ and ″old″ patriotic groups, which were in the foundation of differentiation between the Conservative and Liberal political fractions in the Constituent Assembly in 1879 in Veliko Tarnovo.

== Bulgarian schism ==
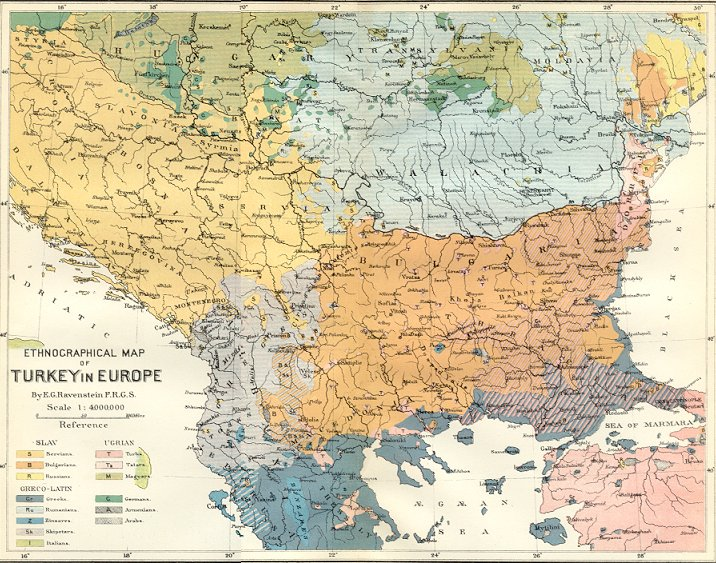
Ethnic composition of the central Balkans in 1870.

The first (after Hilarion of Lovech had to resign before being confirmed by the government) Bulgarian Exarch was Antim I who was elected by the Holy Synod of the Exarchate on 28 February [O.S. 16 February] 1872.

On 23 May [O.S. 11 May] 1872, in the Bulgarian St. Stephen Church in Constantinople, which had been closed by the Ecumenical Patriarch's order, Antim I, along with other Bulgarian hierarchs who were then restricted from all priestly ministries, celebrated a liturgy, whereafter he declared autocephaly of the Bulgarian Church.

The Patriarchal Synod reacted by defrocking Antim I and excommunicating others, including Ilarion Stoyanov.

Tsarevna Miladinova's Bulgarian boarding-school for girls in Thessaloniki, 1882–1883

The decision on the unilateral declaration of autocephaly by the Bulgarian Church was not accepted by the Patriarchate of Constantinople.

The subsequent Council in Constantinople, chaired by Ecumenical Patriarch Anthimus VI, in September 1872, wherein the Patriarchs of Alexandria, Antioch and Jerusalem (the latter declined to sign the Council's decisions) also participated, declared on September 18 (September 30) the Bulgarian Exarchate schismatic and declared its adherents excommunicated. The latter were accused of having "surrendered Orthodoxy to ethnic nationalism", which had been qualified as a heresy - "ethnophyletism" (Greek: εθνοφυλετισμός). Furthermore on January 21, 1872, on request of the Patriarch and under the influence of Count Nikolay Pavlovich Ignatyev, then an influential Russian Ambassador in Constantinople, the Ottoman government sent into exile in İzmir, Anatolia three Bulgarian clerks Hilarion of Makariopolis, Panaret of Plovdiv and Hilarion of Lovech. The energetic protests of the Bulgarian community in Istanbul, reverts the decision short after.

The Russian Most Holy Synod claimed neutrality, but the Russian government, represented by Count Nikolai Ignatiev, actively mediated in the Greek-Bulgarian dispute. The unity of the Orthodox Church was instrumental for Russian's political interests in the Orthodox world. The attempts though to satisfy the Greek Patriarchate by reducing the territories of the Bulgarian Exarchate (noticeably Vardar, Pirin and Greek Macedonia), proved fruitless and against the Bulgarian interests.

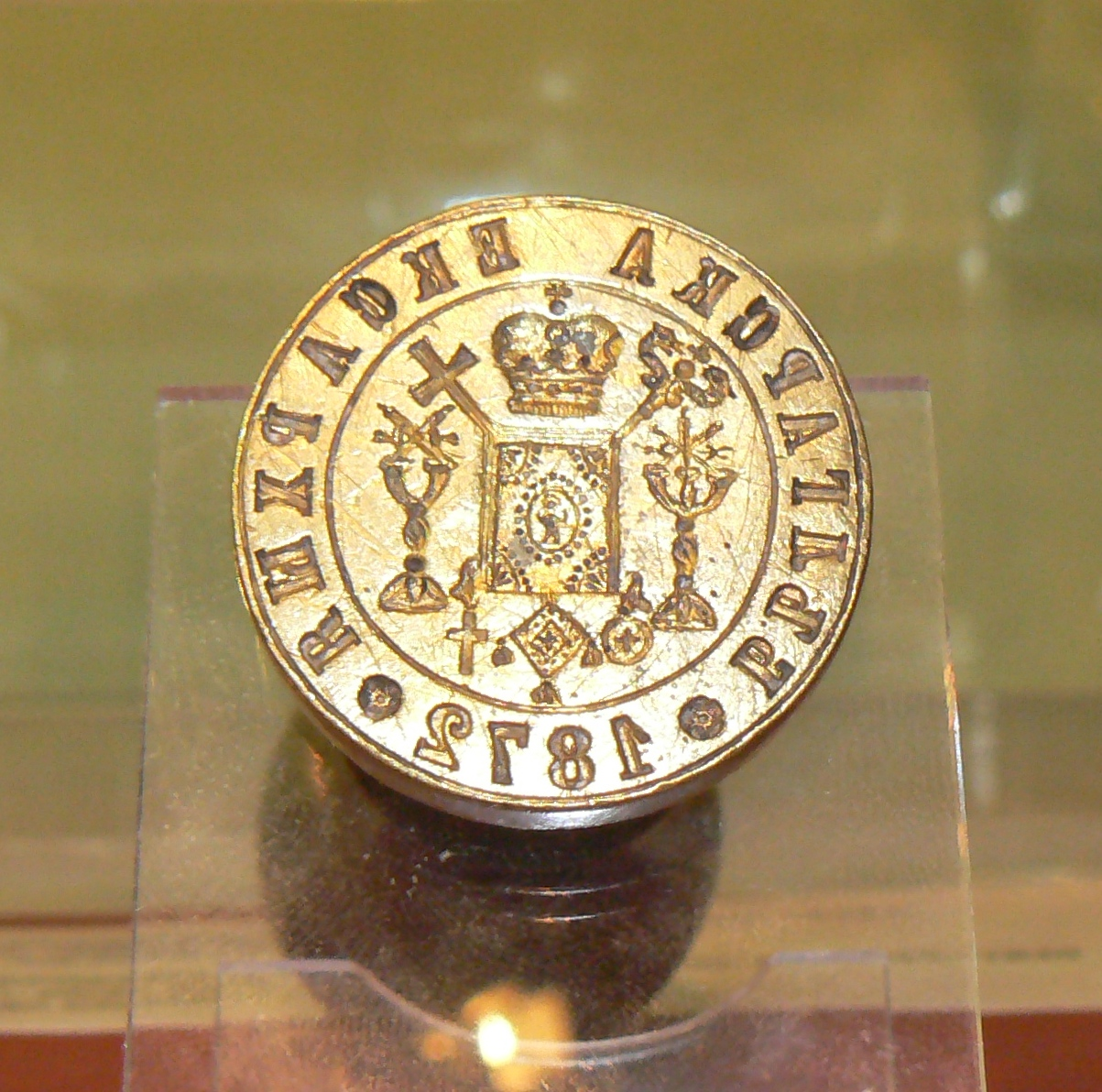
Seal of Bulgarian-Exarchate, 1872

Exarch Antim I was discharged by the Ottoman government immediately after the outbreak of the Russo-Turkish War (1877–1878) on April 24, 1877, and was sent into exile in Ankara. Under the guidance of his successor, Joseph I, the Exarchate managed to develop and considerably extend its church and school network in the Bulgarian Principality, Eastern Rumelia, Macedonia and the Adrianople Vilayet. In 1879, the Tarnovo Constitution formally established the Bulgarian Orthodox Church as the national religion of the nation. On the eve of the Balkan Wars in 1912, in the Ottoman Macedonian vilayets and the Adrianople Vilayet alone, the Bulgarian Exarchate had seven dioceses with prelates and eight more with acting chairmen in charge and 38 vicariates, 1,218 parishes and 1,310 parish priests, 1331 churches, 73 monasteries and 234 chapels, as well as 1,373 schools with 2,266 teachers and 78,854 pupils. Almost all of the schoolmasters had been born in Macedonia and Adrianople Thrace.

The immediate effect of the partition of the Ottoman Empire during the Balkan Wars was the anti-Bulgarian campaign in areas under Serbian and Greek rule. The Serbians expelled Exarchist churchmen and teachers and closed Bulgarian schools and churches (affecting the standing of as many as 641 schools and 761 churches). Thousands of Bulgarian refugees left for Bulgaria, joining an even larger stream from the devastated Aegean Macedonia, where the Greeks burned Kukush, the center of Bulgarian politics and culture. Bulgarian language (including the Macedonian dialects) was prohibited, and its surreptitious use, whenever detected, was ridiculed or punished. The Ottomans managed to keep the Adrianople region, where the whole Thracian Bulgarian population was put to total ethnic cleansing by the Young Turks' army.

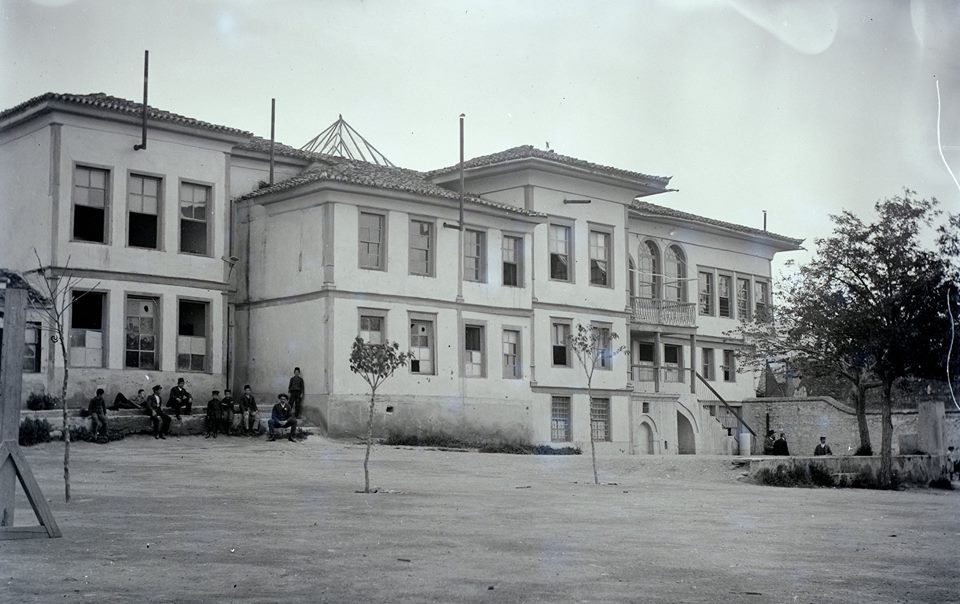
Bulgarian Men's High School of Thessaloniki in the beginning of the 20th century

In 1913, Exarch Joseph I transferred his offices from Istanbul to Sofia; he died in 1915, a few months before Bulgaria fatefully opted to participate in World War I alongside the Central Powers. As a consequence of the Treaty of Neuilly-sur-Seine in 1919, the Bulgarian Exarchate was deprived of its dioceses in Macedonia and Aegean Thrace. During the three decades after Joseph's death, the Bulgarian Orthodox Church did not elect a regular head because of opposition from the Bulgarian government.

Conditions for the restoration of the Bulgarian Patriarchate and the election of head of the Bulgarian Church were created after World War II. In 1945 the schism was lifted and the Patriarch of Constantinople recognised the autocephaly of the Bulgarian Church. In 1950, the Holy Synod adopted a new Statute which paved the way for the restoration of the Patriarchate and in 1953, it elected the Metropolitan of Plovdiv, Cyril, Bulgarian Patriarch.

== Territory of the Bulgarian Exarchate ==
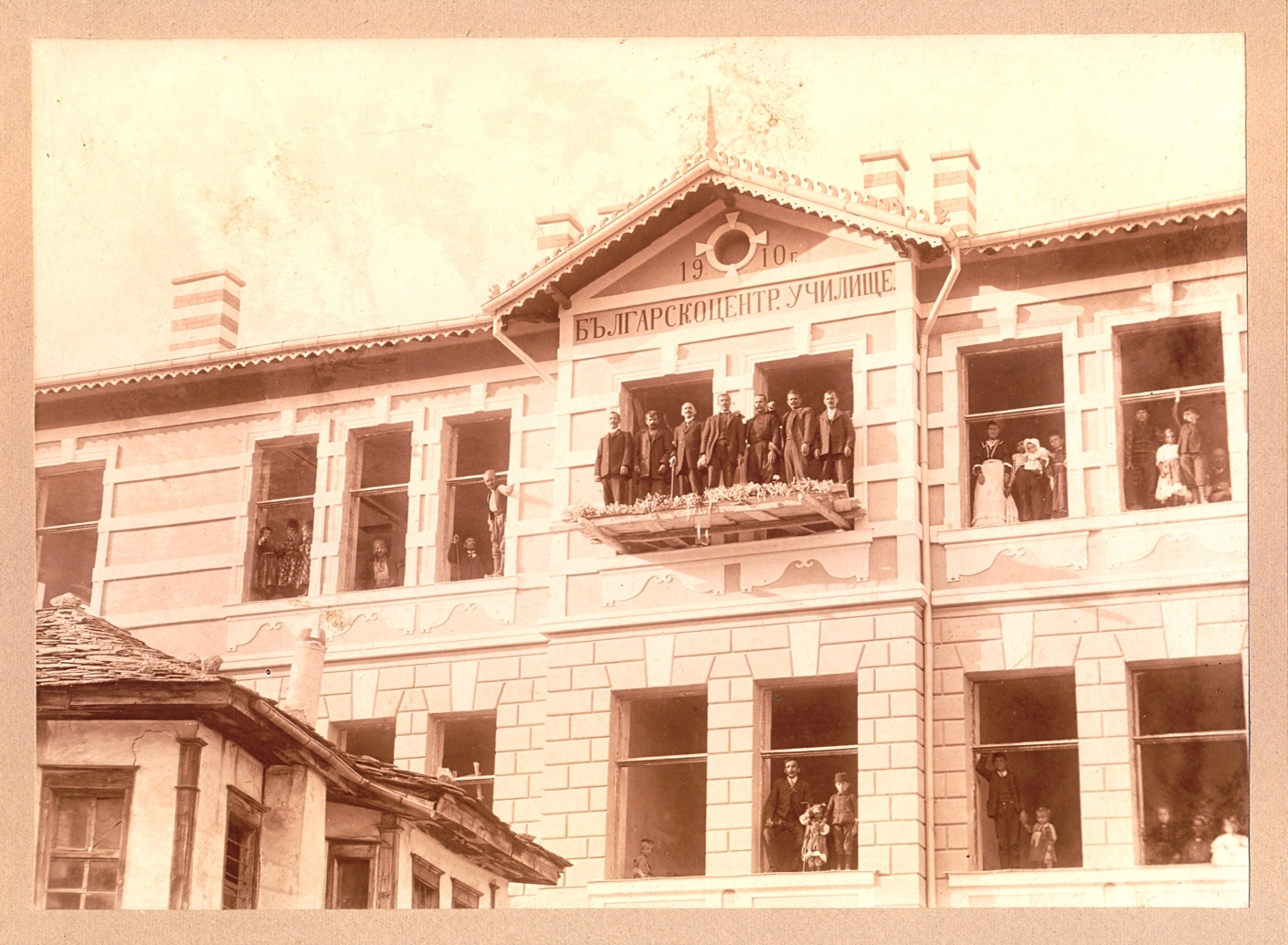
Bulgarian School in Kruševo (1910)

Until the Balkan Wars 1912/1913, the Bulgarian Exarchate disposed of a total of 23 bishoprics in Bulgaria, most of the Torlak-populated area (in 1878 partly ceded by the Ottoman Empire to Serbia) and the region of Macedonia: Vidin, Vratsa, Nish (till 1878), Lovech, Veliko Tarnovo, Rousse, Silistra, Varna, Preslav, Sliven, Stara Zagora, Pirot (till 1878), Plovdiv, Sofia, Samokov, Kyustendil, Skopje, Debar, Bitola, Ohrid, Veles, Strumitsa and Nevrokop; also it was represented by acting chairmen in charge in eight other bishoprics in the region of Macedonia and the Adrianople Vilayet (Lerin, Edessa, Kostur, Solun, Kukush, Syar, Odrin and Carevo).

== See also ==
- List of patriarchs of the Bulgarian Orthodox Church
- Bulgarian Orthodox Church
