= Bulgarian St. Stephen Church =

St. Stephen Church
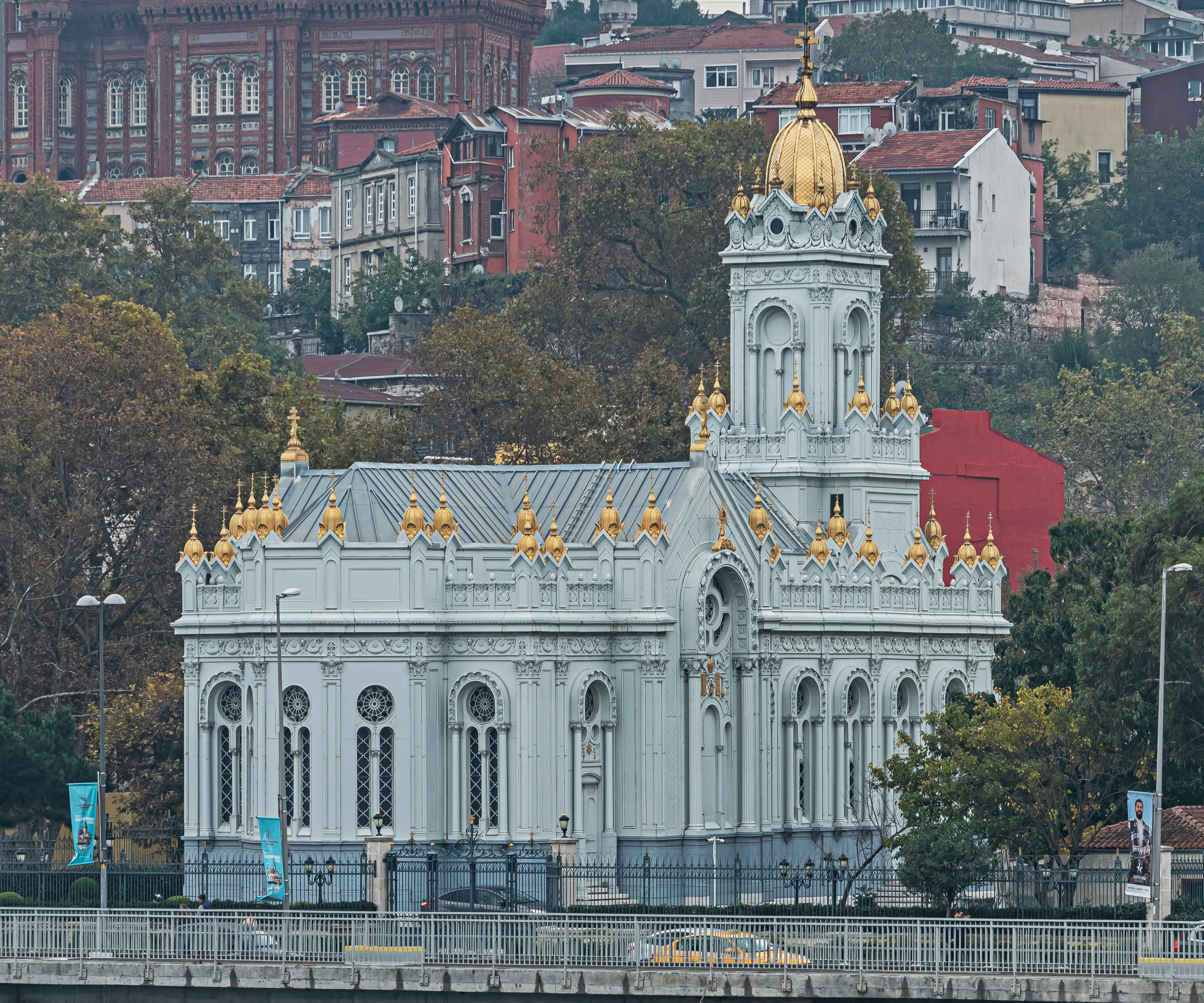

- Location within Istanbul Fatih

Religion
- Affiliation: Eastern Orthodox
- Status: Church

Location
- Location: Istanbul, Turkey
- Coordinates: 41°01′54″N 28°56′59″E

Architecture
- Type: Church
- Style: Neo-Byzantine
- Materials: Iron, stone

Website

UNESCO World Heritage Site
- Part of: Historic Areas of Istanbul
- Criteria: Cultural: i, ii, iii, iv
- Reference: 356
- Inscription: 1985 (9th Session)

The Bulgarian St. Stephen Church (Bulgarian: Църква "Свети Стефан"; Turkish: Sveti Stefan Kilisesi), also known as the Bulgarian Iron Church, is a Bulgarian Orthodox church in Balat, Istanbul, Turkey. It is famous for being made of prefabricated cast iron elements in the Neo-Byzantine style. The church belongs to the Bulgarian Christian minority in the city.

== History ==
The Bulgarian Orthodox Christians of the Ottoman Empire used to pray at the churches of the Phanar Orthodox Patriarchate, as they were part of the Rum Millet—that is, the Orthodox Christian community of the Ottoman Empire—but the Bulgarian nationalist movement of the 19th century advocated the creation of a separate Bulgarian ecclesiastical organization for Bulgarian Orthodox Christians, as they considered the Phanar Patriarchate a predominantly Greek Orthodox institution. These efforts culminated in the recognition of the Bulgarian Exarchate through a firman issued by the Ottoman sultan Abdülaziz in 1870.

The richly ornamented church is a three-domed cross-shaped basilica. The altar faces the Golden Horn and a 40 m-high belfry, the six bells of which were cast in Yaroslavl, rises above the narthex. Initially, a small wooden church was erected on the shore of the Golden Horn between Balat and Fener squares (near Eyüp District), where the current church is located. A house was donated by the statesman Stefan Bogoridi, and it was reorganized as a wooden church. It was inaugurated on 9 October 1849 and became an important site of the Bulgarian National Revival. The Ottoman royal decree of 28 February 1870 establishing the Bulgarian Exarchate was first read in the church.

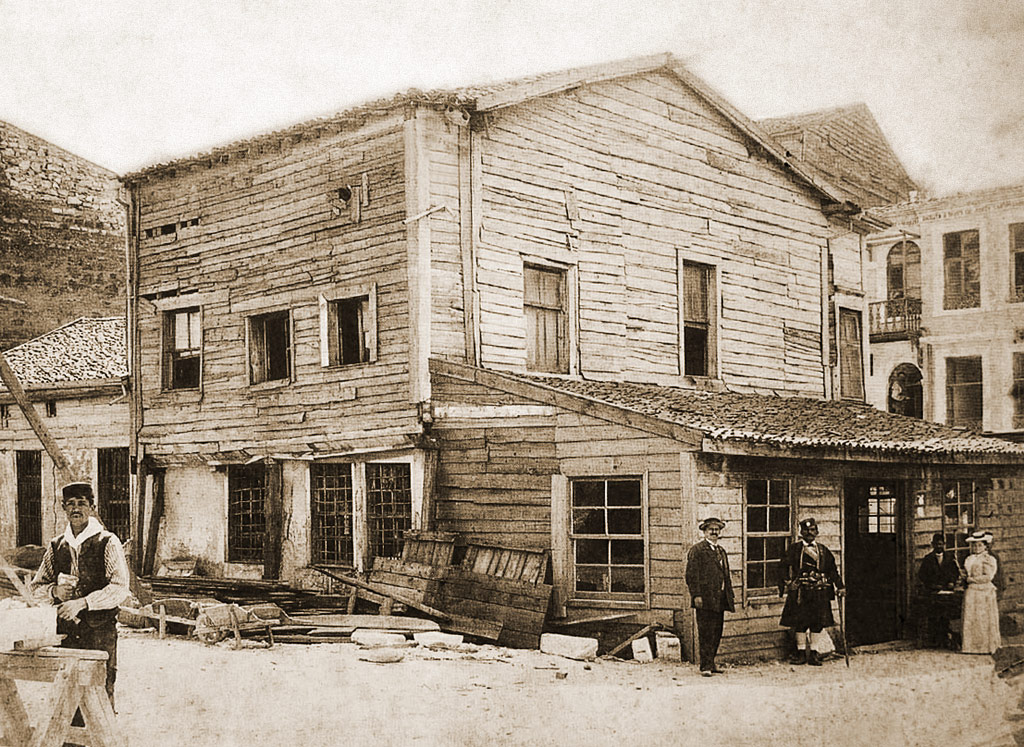
The original wooden church of St. Stephen, built in memory of Stefan Bogoridi

After the original wooden structure suffered from a fire, the larger current building was constructed at its place. An iron frame was preferred to concrete reinforcement because of the weak ground conditions. The construction plans were prepared by the Istanbul-based Ottoman Armenian architect Hovsep Aznavur.

An international competition was conducted to produce the prefabricated cast iron parts of the church, won by an Austrian company, R. Ph. Waagner. The prefabricated elements, weighing 500 tons, were produced in Vienna in 1893 to 1896 and transported to Istanbul by ship through the Danube and the Black Sea.

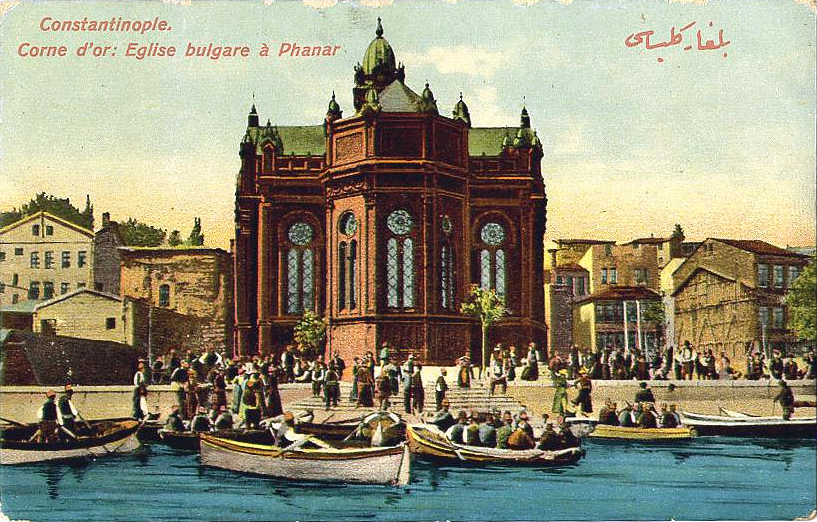
An early 20th-century postcard depicting the Bulgarian St. Stephen Church

After one-and-a-half years, the church was completed in 1898 and inaugurated by Exarch Joseph on 8 September that year. The main skeleton of the church was made of steel and covered by metal boards. All the pieces were attached together with nuts, bolts, rivets or welding. In terms of architectural style, the church combines Neo-Byzantine and Neo-Baroque influences.

St. Stephen was the product of 19th-century experimentation with prefabricated iron churches. The British, who invented the corrugated iron in 1829, manufactured portable iron churches to send to far-flung colonies like Australia. The Eiffel Tower's creator, French engineer Gustave Eiffel, designed iron churches that were sent as far as the Philippines and Peru. Now, St. Stephen is one of the world's few surviving prefabricated cast iron churches.

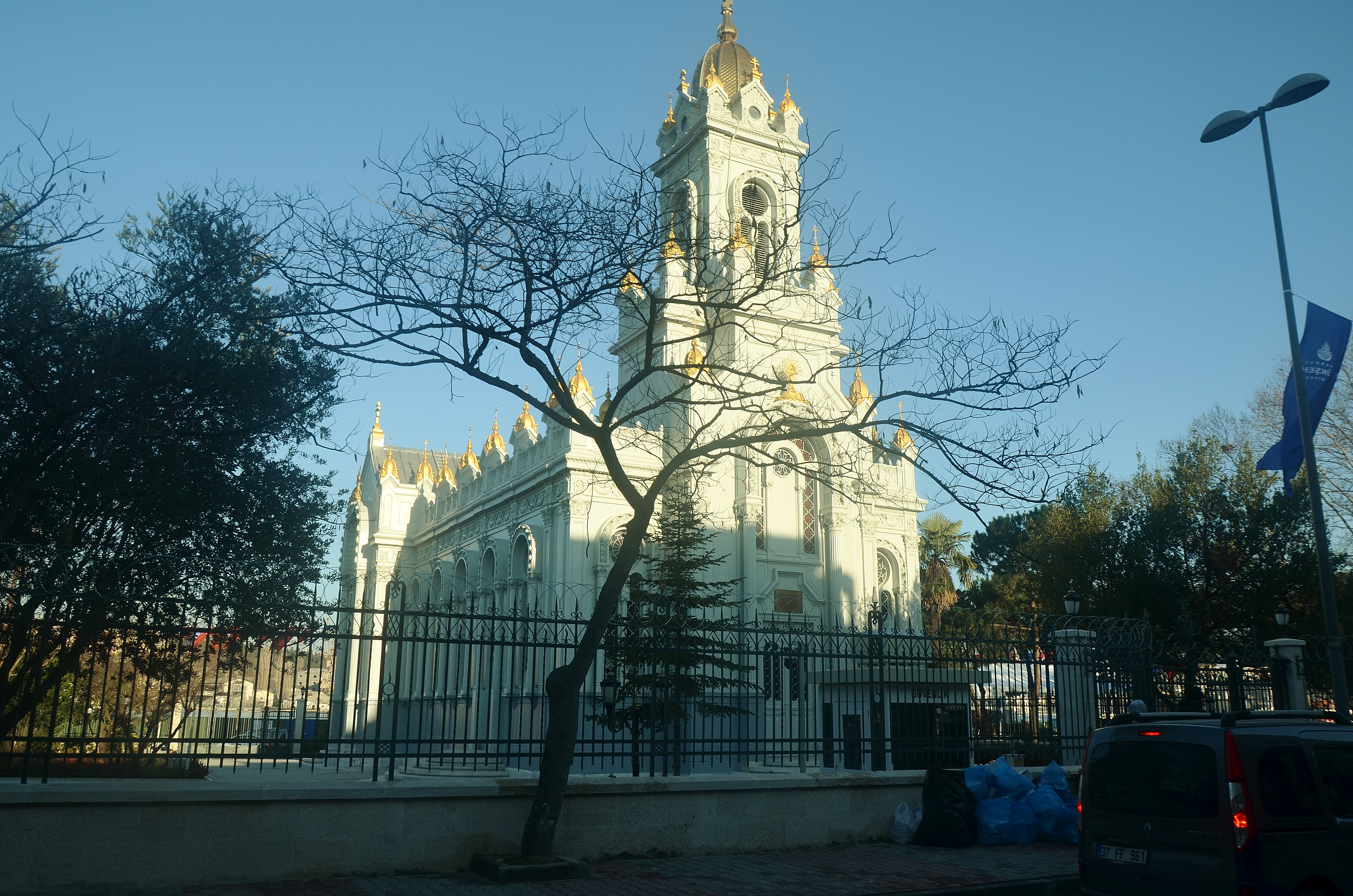
The Bulgarian St. Stephen Church after renovation in 2018

On December 27, 2010, St. Stephen's feast day, a celebratory liturgy was held at the church in honor of its patron saint. Attending were the Vratsa Metropolitan Kalinik, bishop Naum, Chief Secretary of the Bulgarian Holy Synod, and representatives of the "St. Stephen Church" Foundation. Honoring the celebration the dome of the church was gold-plated using funds donated by the Bulgarians of Plovdiv.

The church building underwent a renovation, which started under the Bulgarian-Turkish cooperation in 2011 and cost more than ₺ 15 million. On January 8, 2018, Turkish President Recep Tayyip Erdogan and Bulgarian Prime Minister Boyko Borisov were present at the inauguration of the renovated St. Stephen's Orthodox Church in Istanbul, on the occasion of its 120th anniversary.

In addition to the St. Stephen Church, there is another Bulgarian Orthodox church in Istanbul, St. Demetrius Church, in Feriköy.

== Burials ==
- Ilarion Makariopolski
- Parteniy Zografski

== Gallery ==
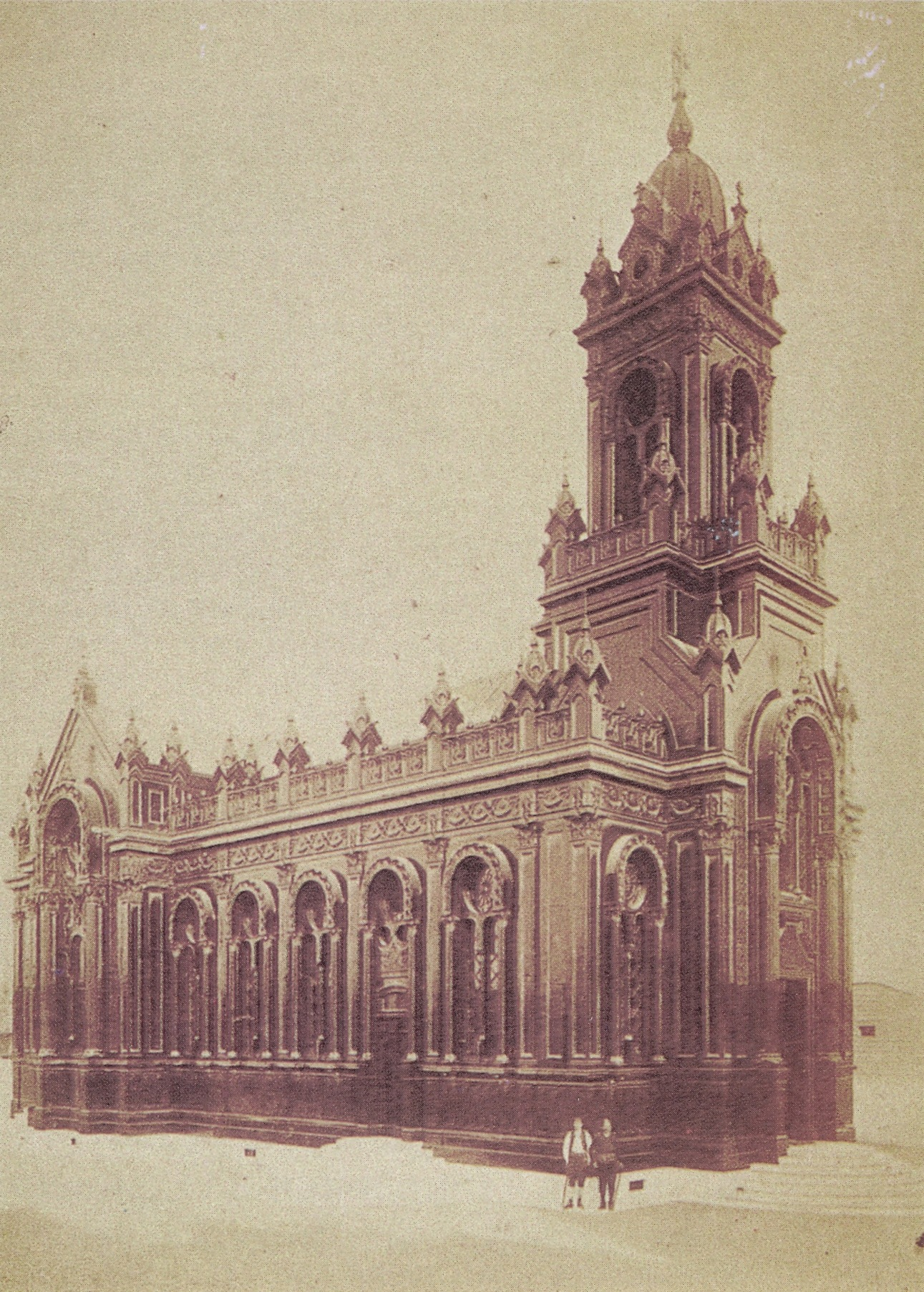
Iron church of St. Stephen in 1898

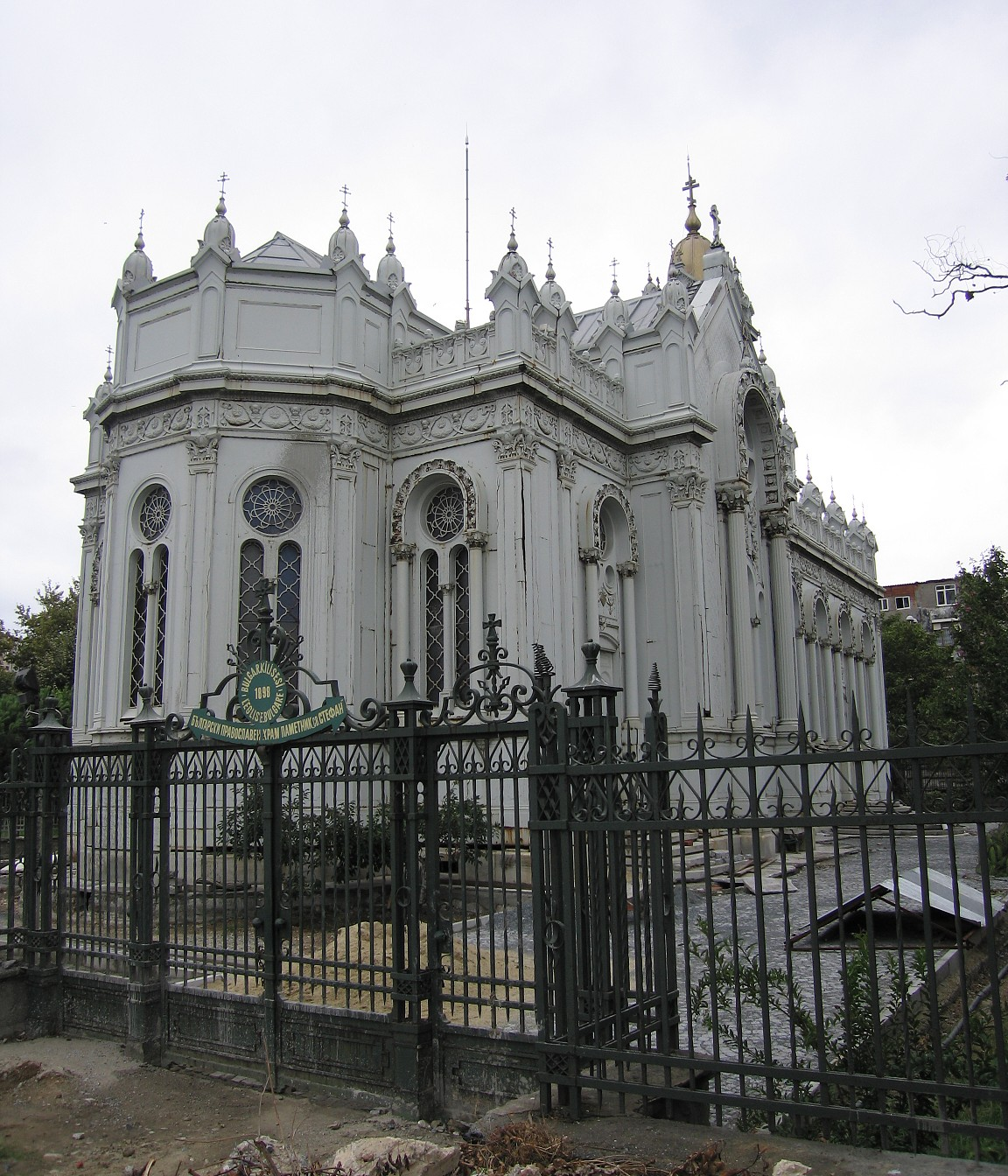
View from the Golden Horn

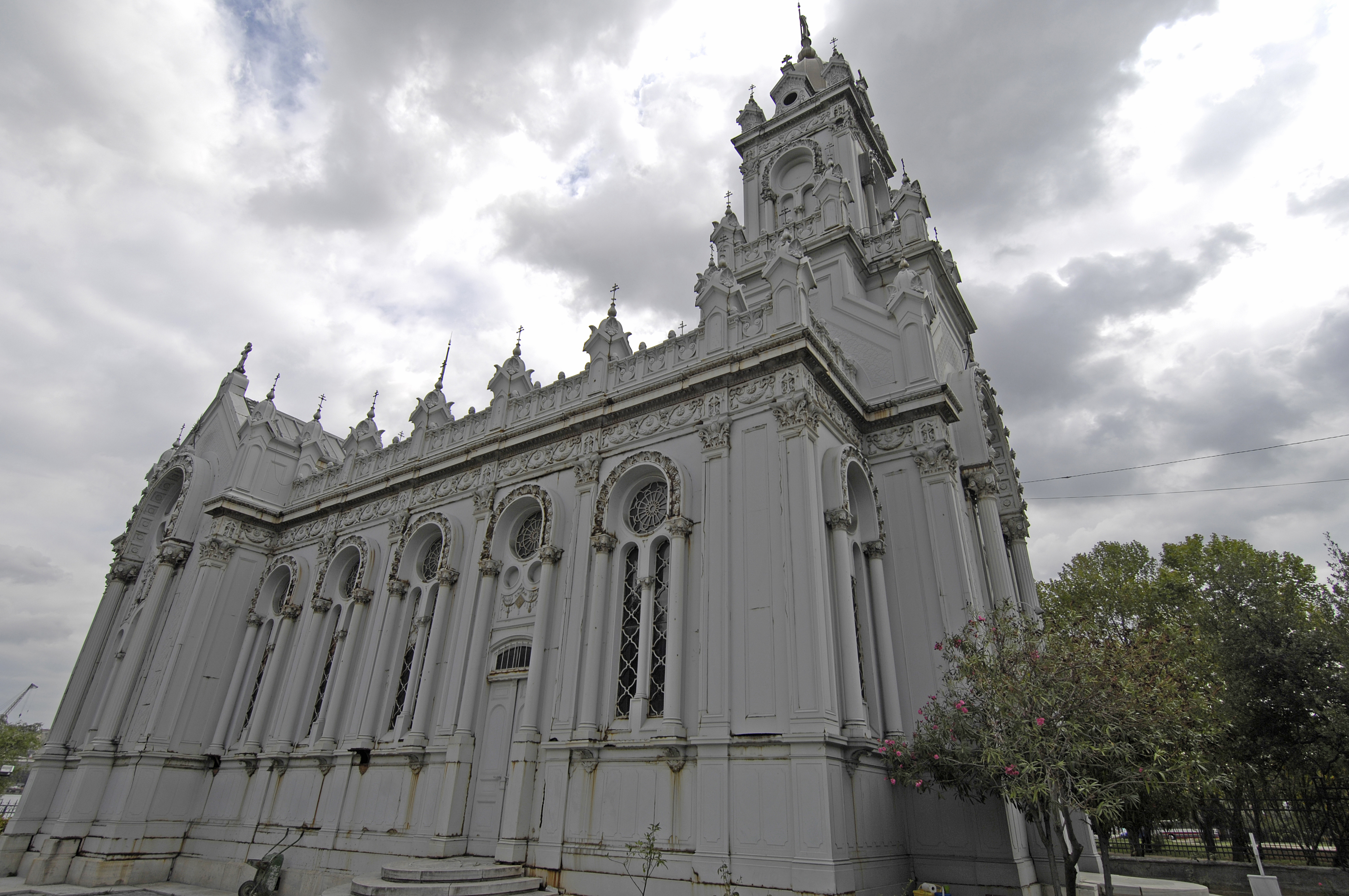
Exterior view of the Bulgarian St. Stephen Church

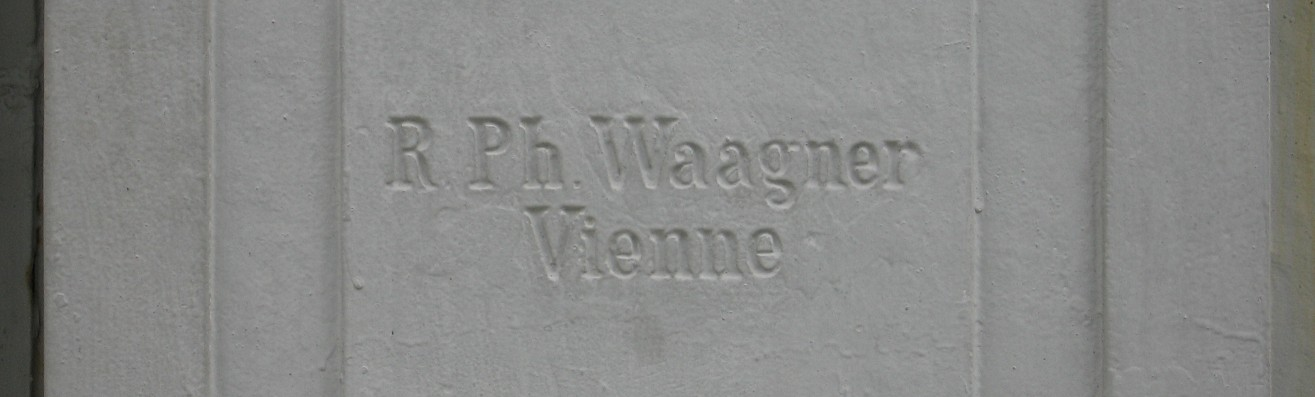
Rudolph Philipp Waagner, Vienna, producer of the steel elements

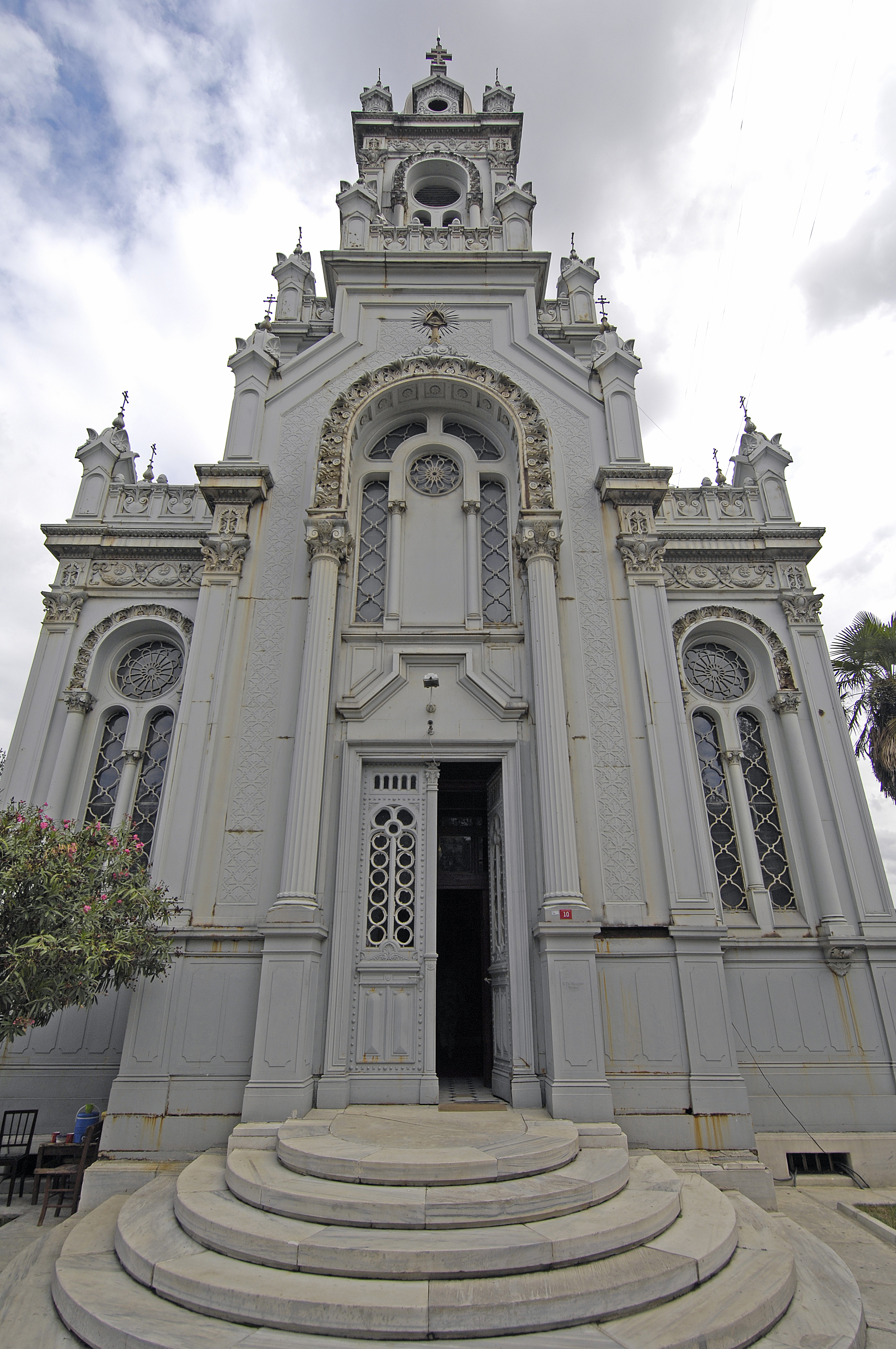
Front view of the Bulgarian St. Stephen Church

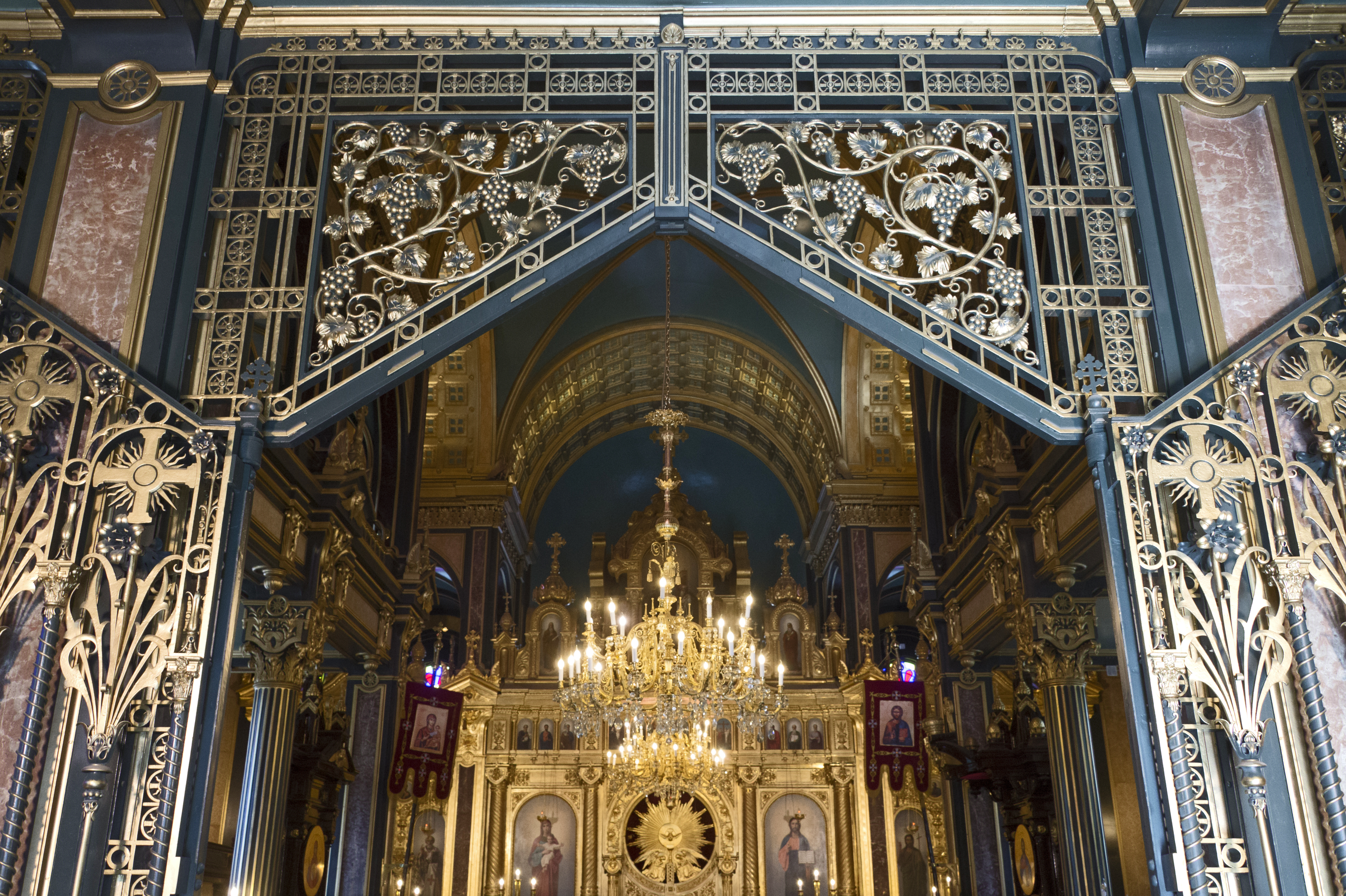
Bulgarian St. Stephen Church top iconostasis seen through doors

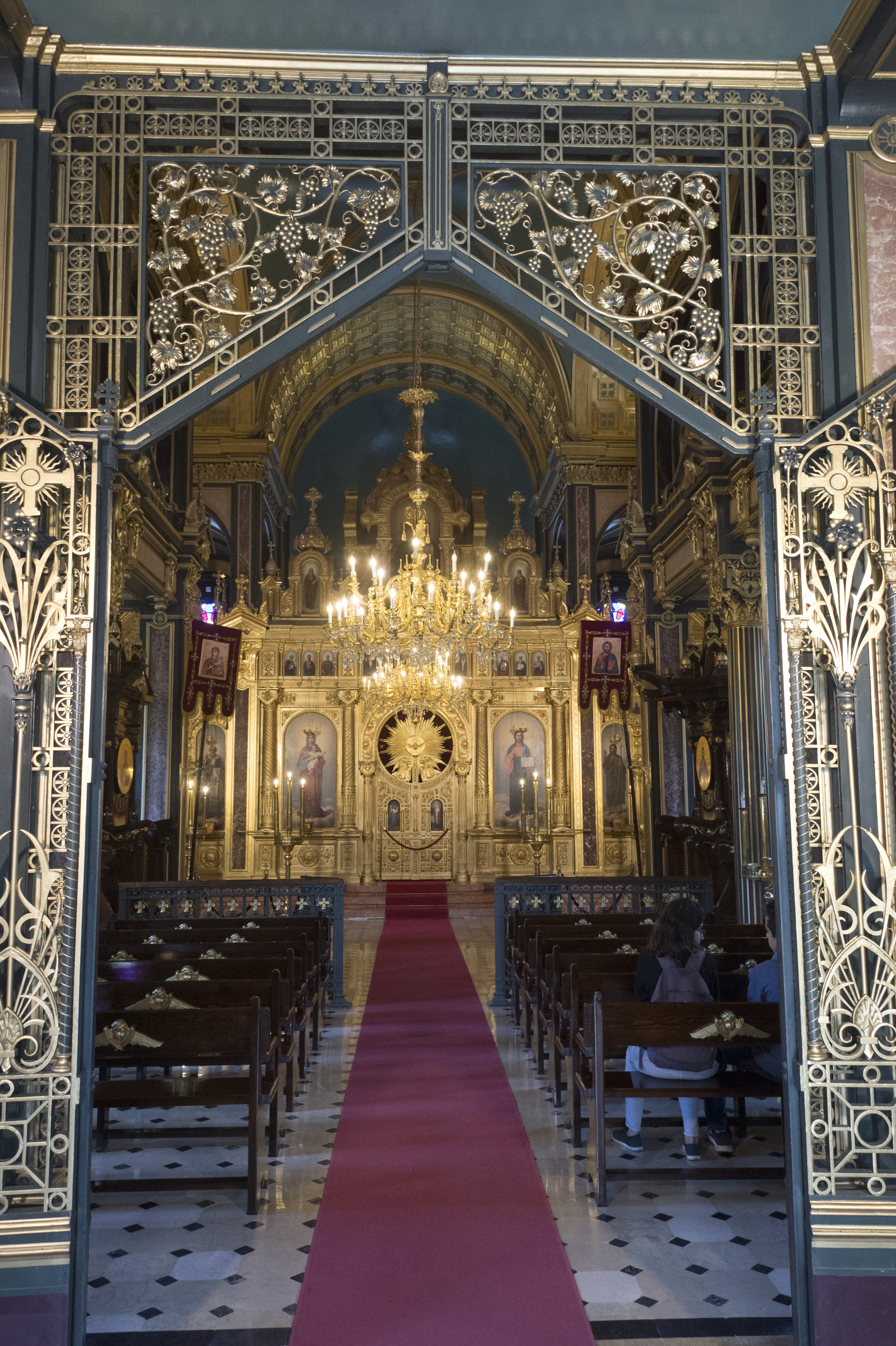
Bulgarian St. Stephen Church top iconostasis seen through doors

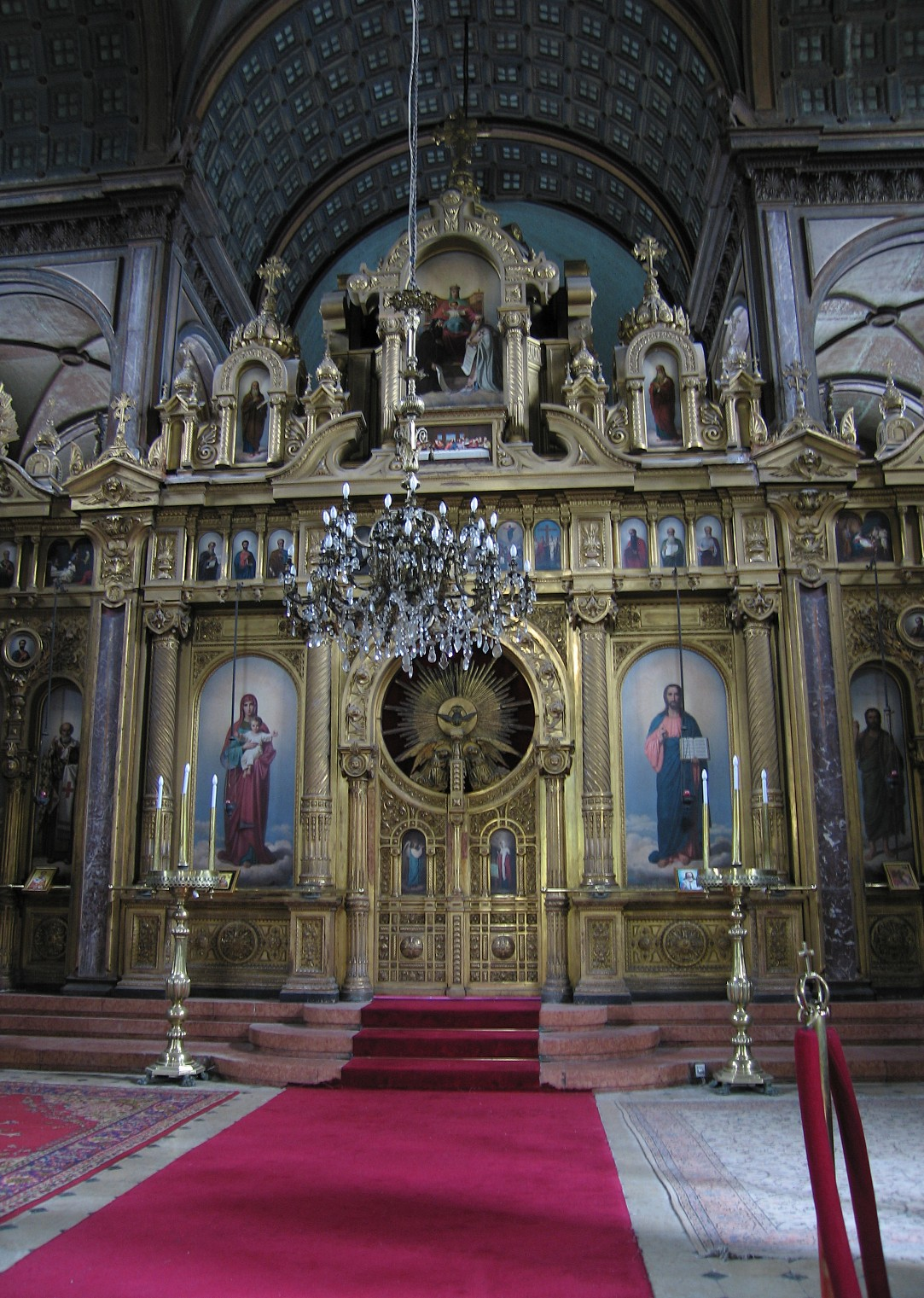
The iconostasis inside the Bulgarian St. Stephen Church

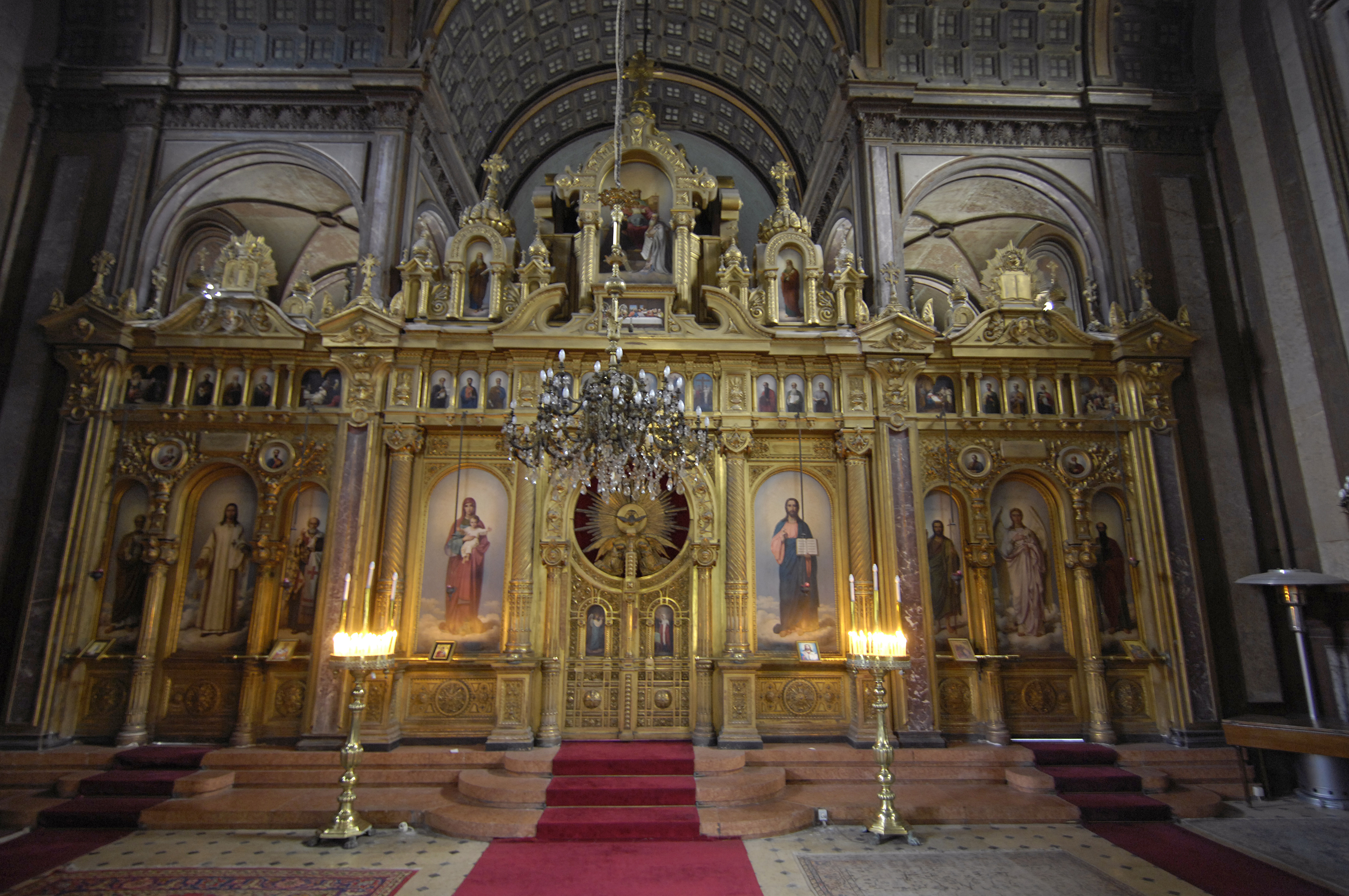
The iconostasis inside the Bulgarian St. Stephen Church

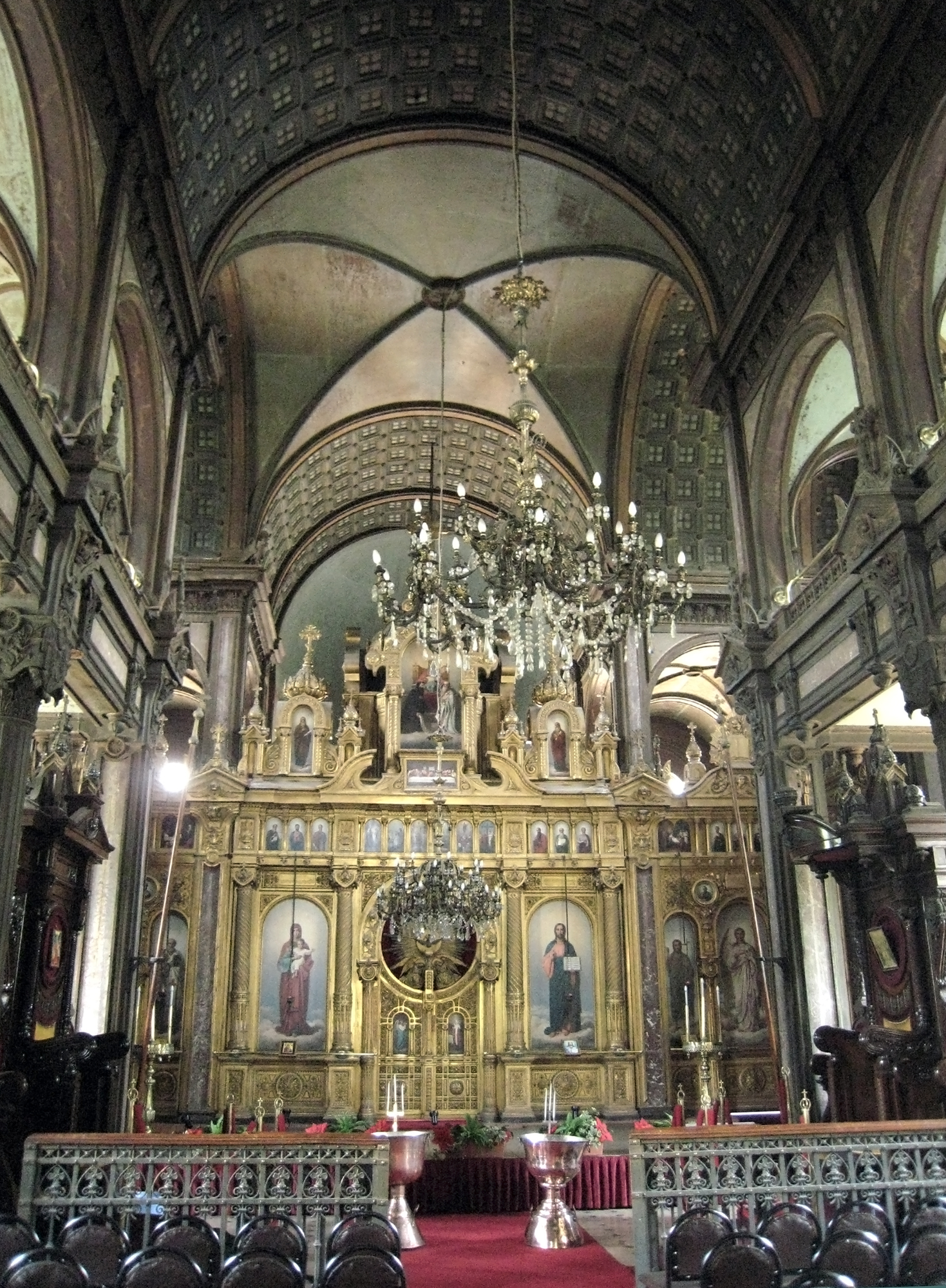
Interior view of the Bulgarian St. Stephen Church

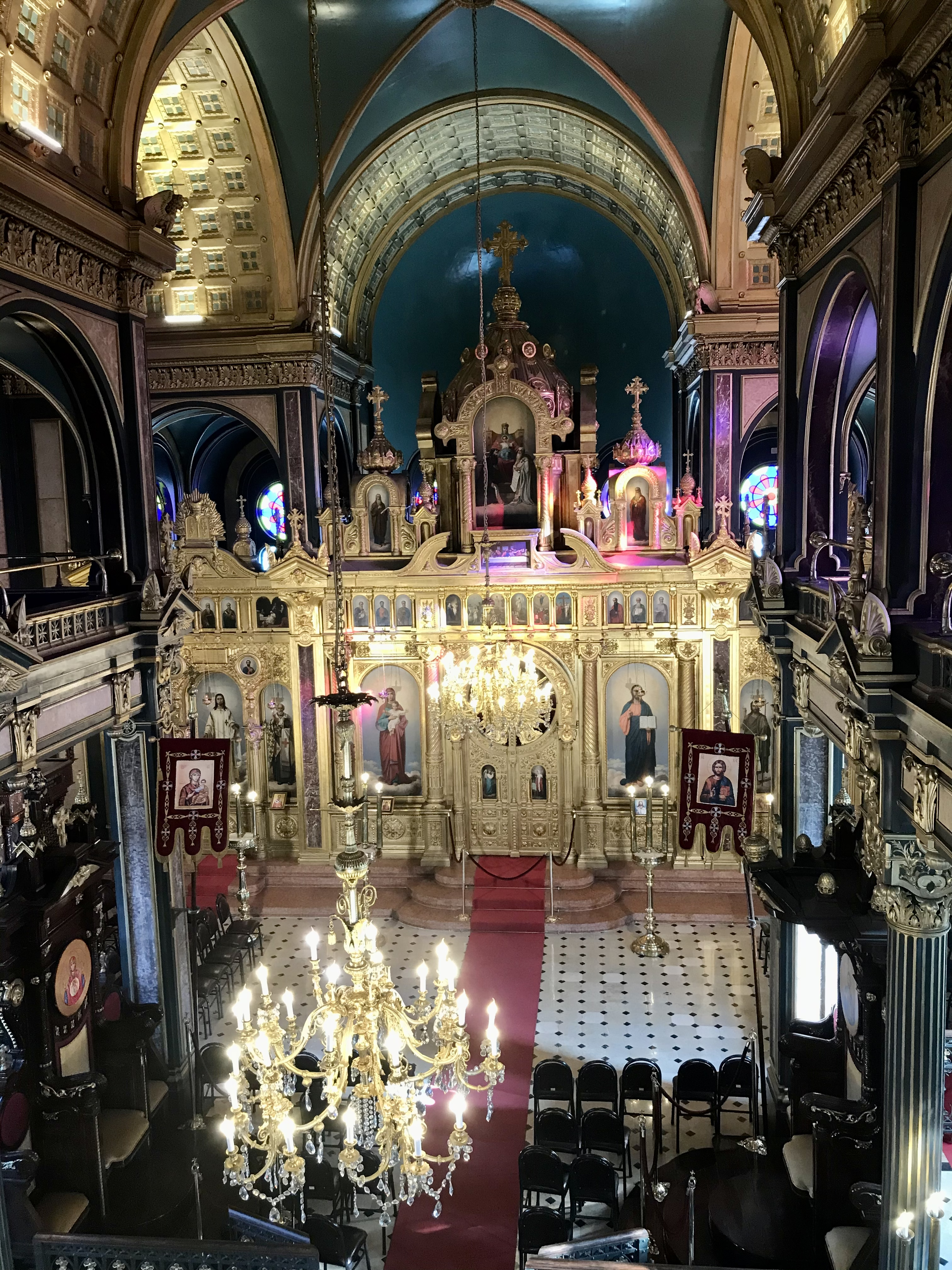
Interior view of the Bulgarian St. Stephen Church

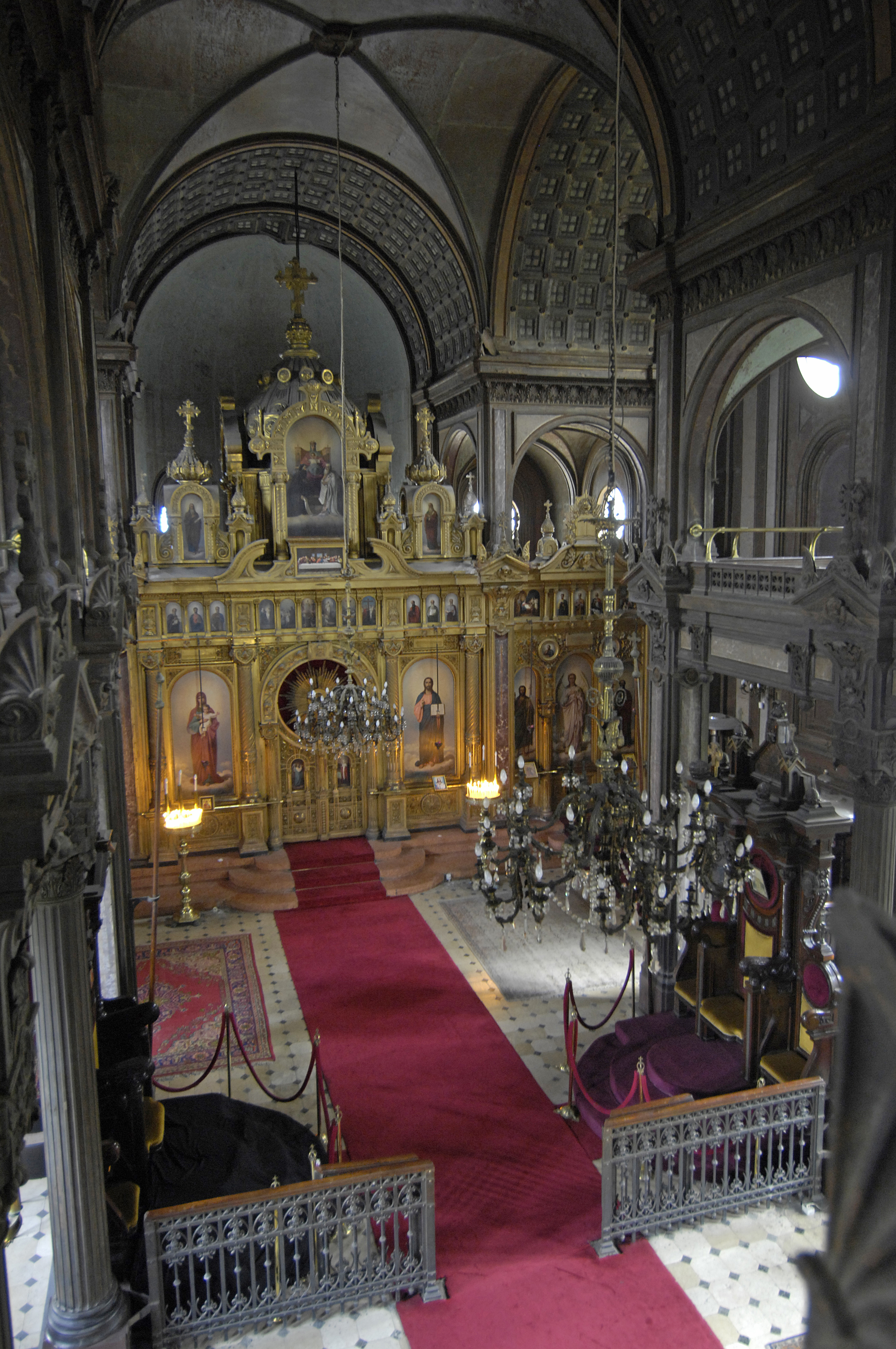
Bulgarian St. Stephen Church, view from first floor

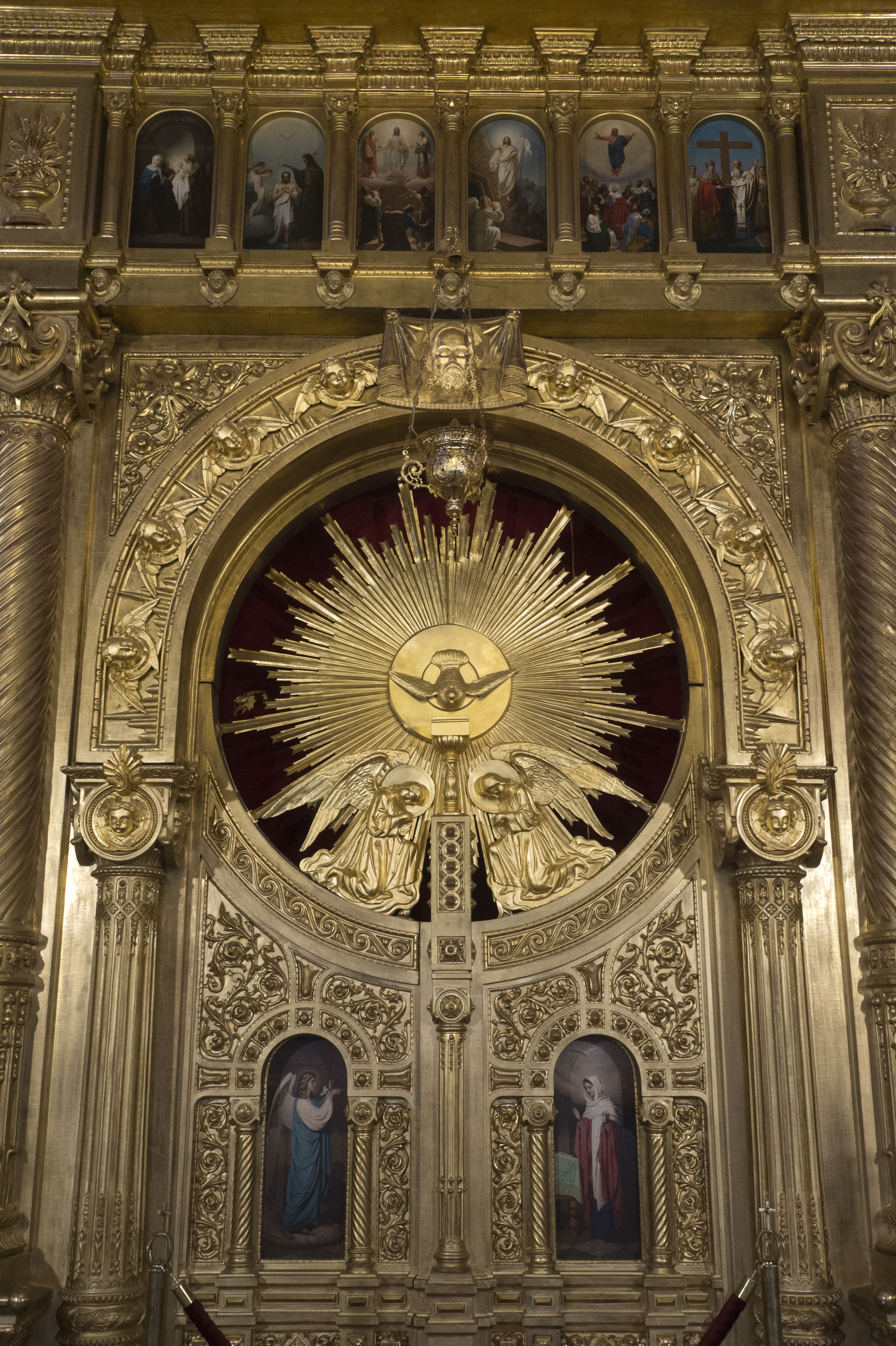
Bulgarian St. Stephen Church Iconostasis, detail

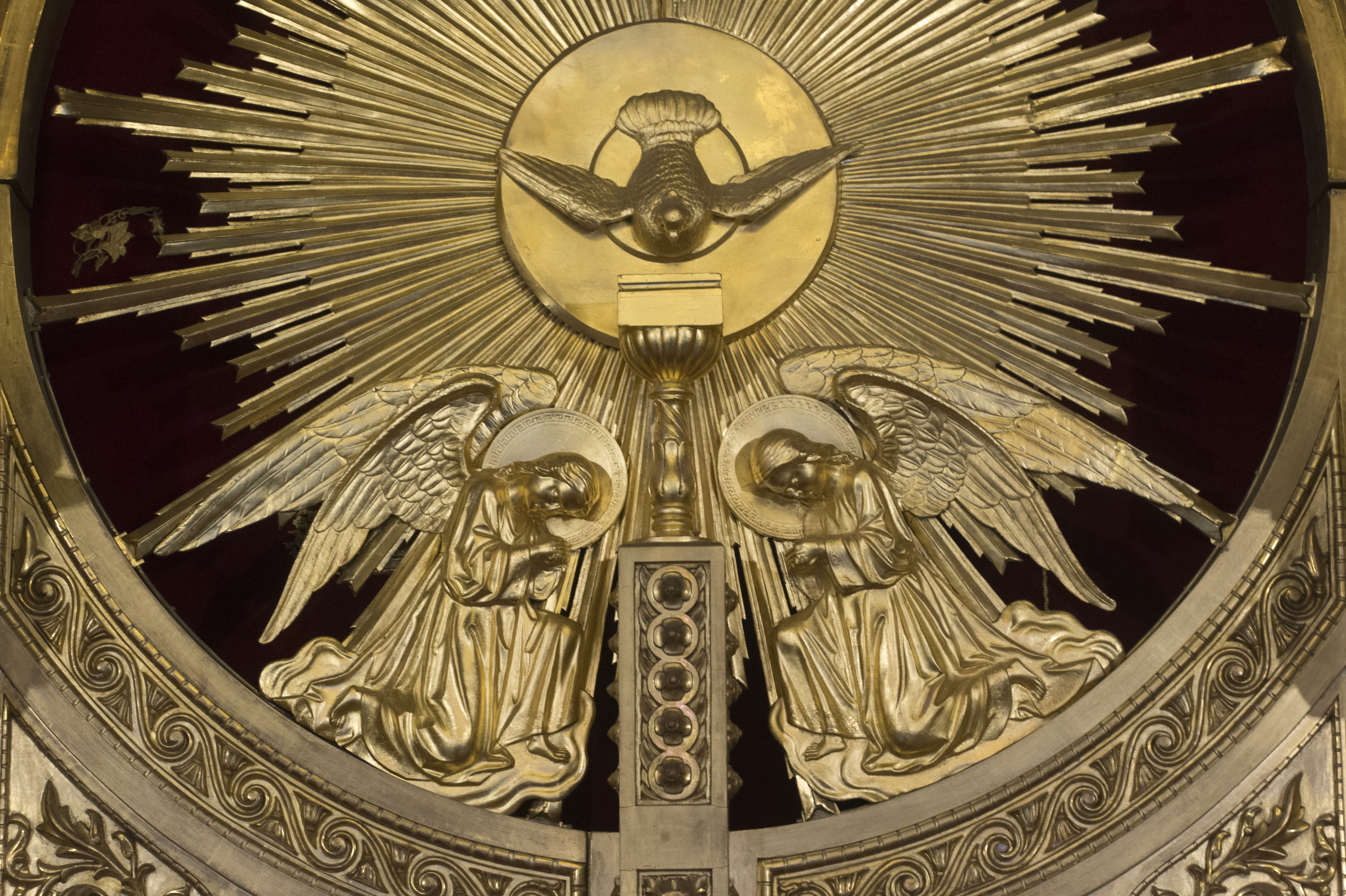
Bulgarian St. Stephen Church Iconostasis, detail

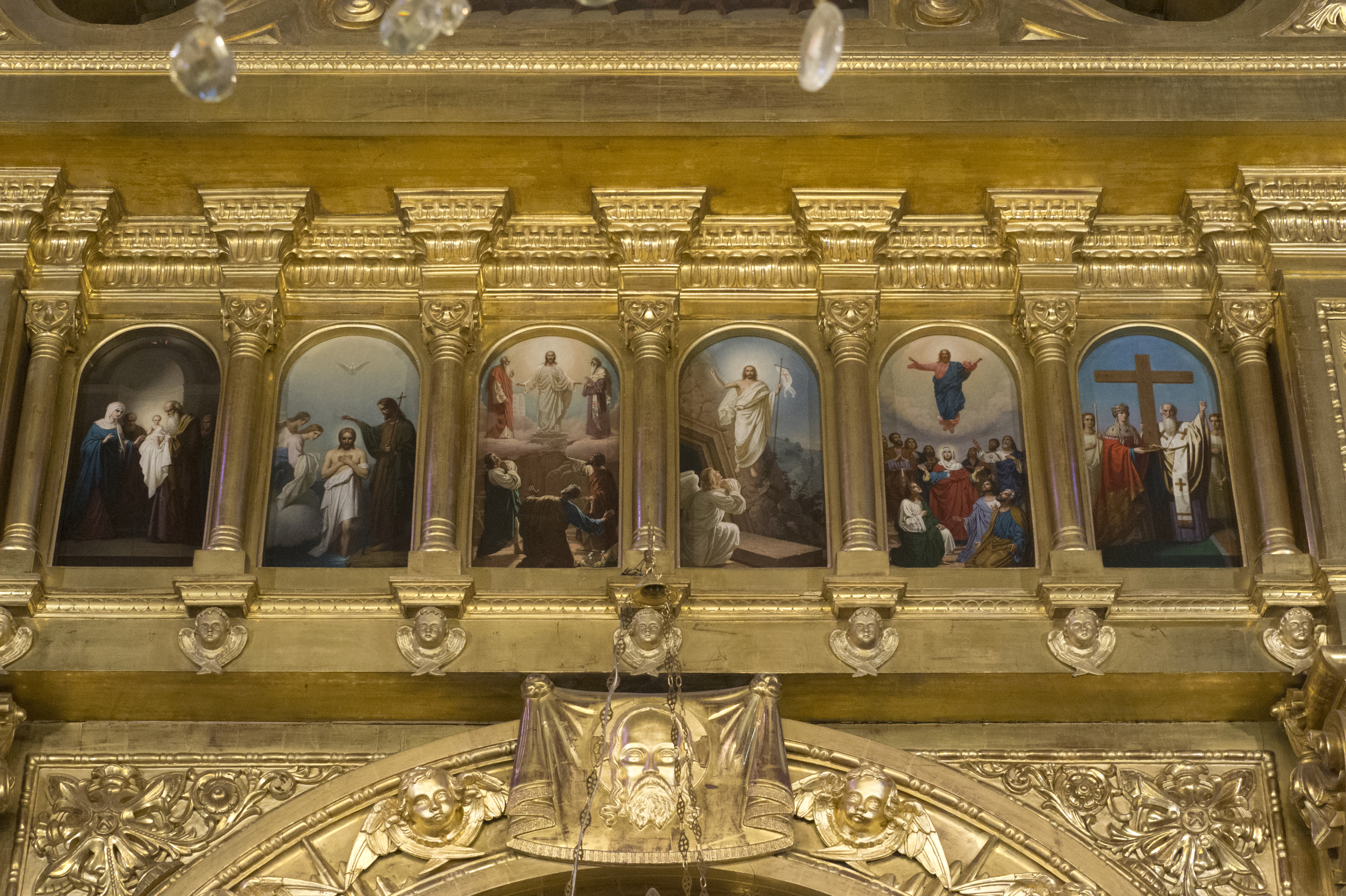
Bulgarian St. Stephen Church Iconostasis, detail

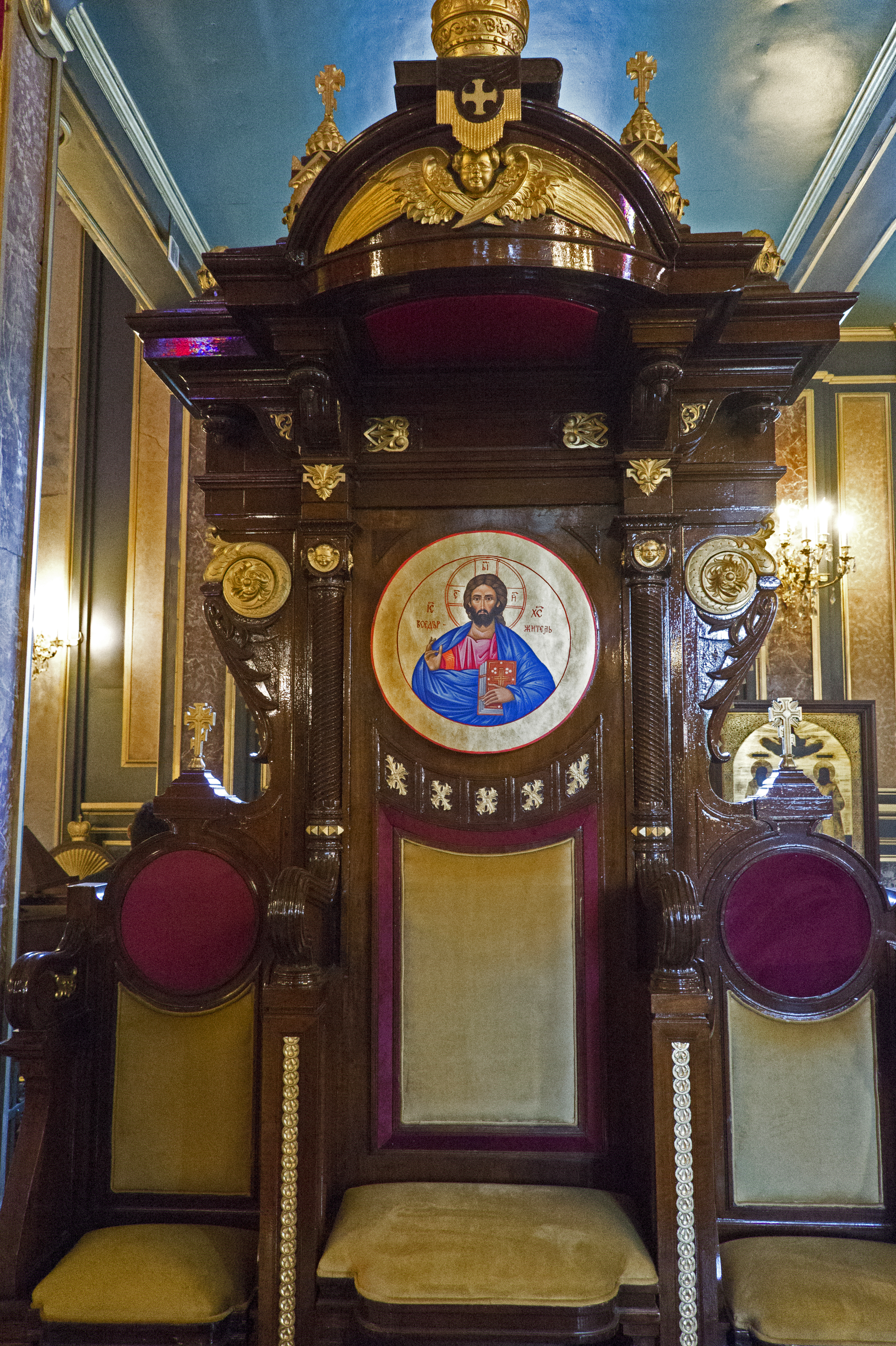
Bulgarian St. Stephen Church, possibly the bishop's seat

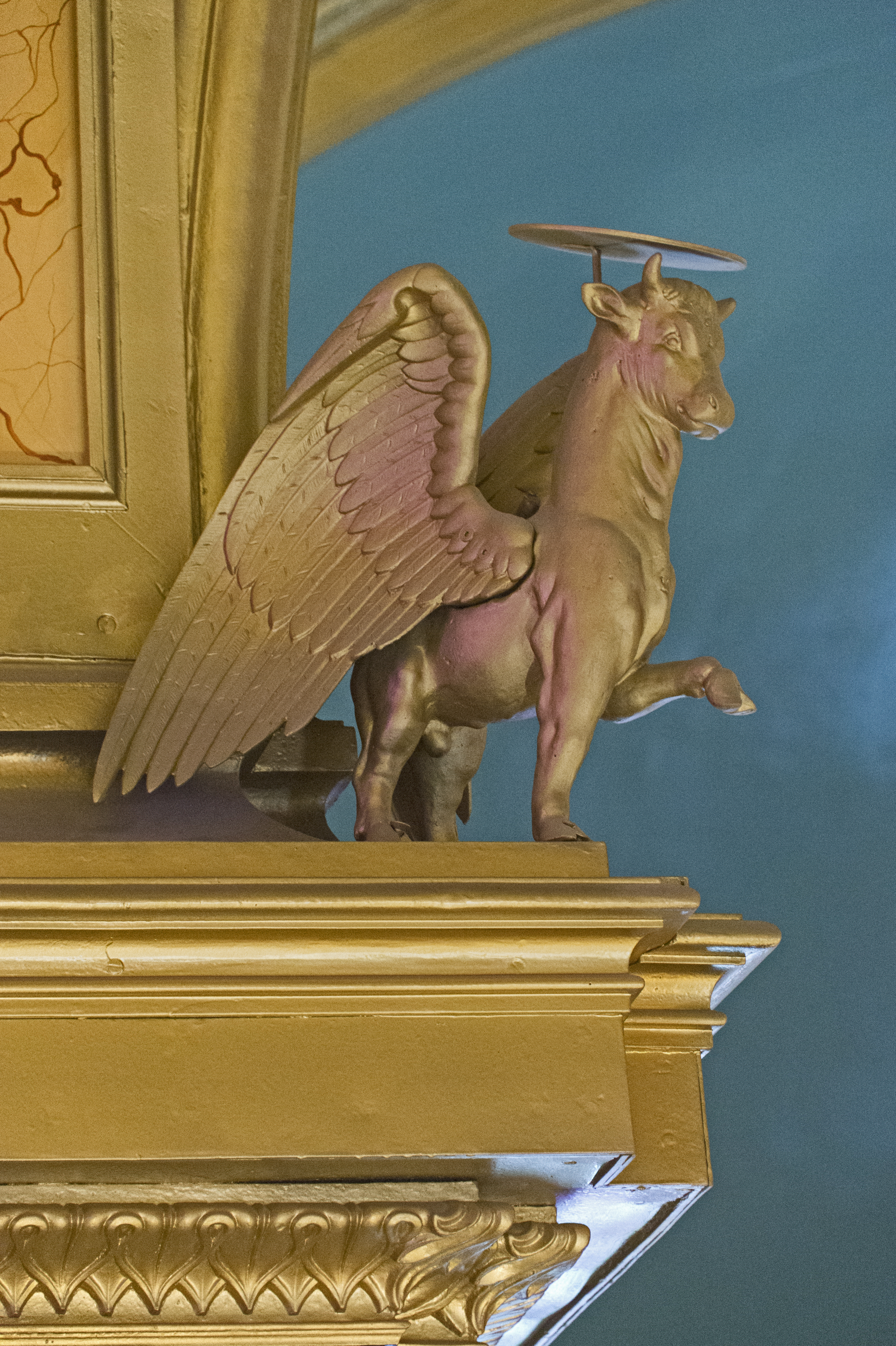
Bulgarian St. Stephen Church; statue of a winged ox representing Luke the Evangelist.

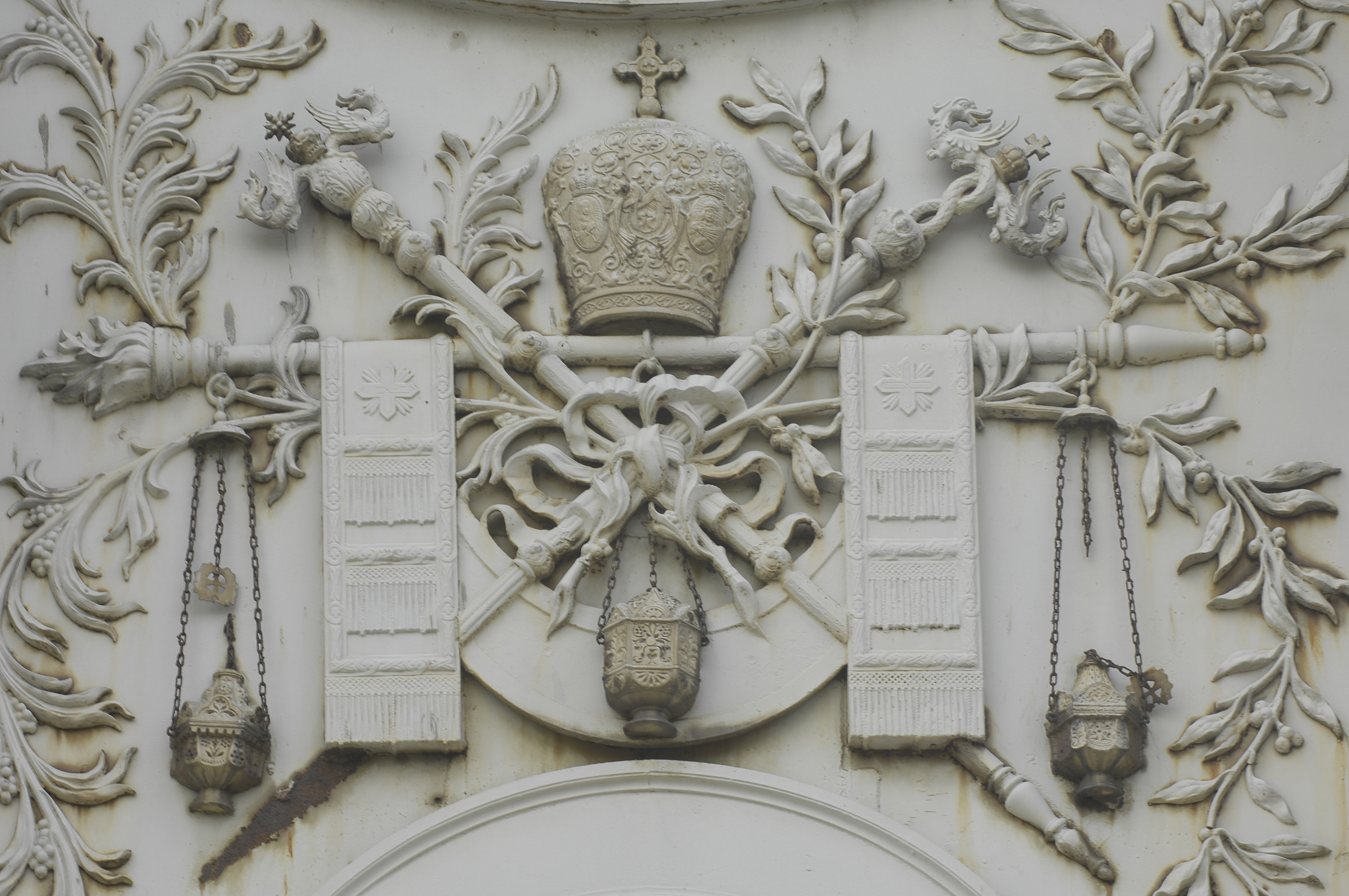
Bulgarian St. Stephen Church, emblem
