= Hovsep Aznavur =

Ottoman Armenian architect

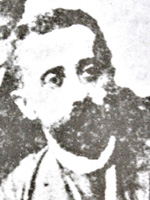
Hovsep Aznavur

Hovsep Aznavur (Armenian: Հովսեփ Ազնավուր, Western Armenian: Յովսէփ Ազնաւուր; 1854 in London – June 1935 in Cairo) was an Ottoman Armenian architect. He is noted for his construction plans for the Bulgarian St. Stephen Church of Istanbul, Turkey.

== Biography ==
Born in London in 1854, Aznavur's family moved to Istanbul in 1867. Aznavur completed his studies at the Academy of Fine Arts in Rome. Some of his best known works are Bulgarian St. Stephen Church, Mısır Apartment and Aznavur Passage. His workshop was located at Saint Pierre Han in Galata.

Asnavur was active in Armenian community life. In 1921, he became a founding member of the Ramgavar Party, one of the three major historic Armenian political parties. He escaped from Istanbul after the Armenian genocide and died at the end of June 1935 in Cairo, Egypt.

== Sources ==
- Pamukçiyan, Kevork. IV. Biyografileriyle Ermeniler, Ermeni Kaynaklarından Tarihe Katkılar, yayına hazırlayan: Osman Köker, Aras Yayıncılık, Istanbul, August 2003.
- Short biography of Hovsep Aznavur (in Turkish)
- Tigran Khzmalyan. Armenian Architects of Istanbul: Online Exhibition, March 27, 2015
- Stefan Bulgar Kilisesi (in Turkish)
