= Hilarion of Makariopolis =

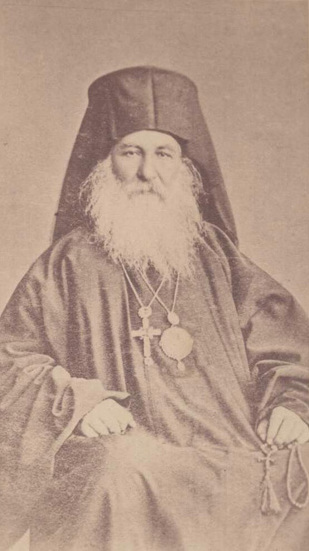
Ilarion Makariopolski

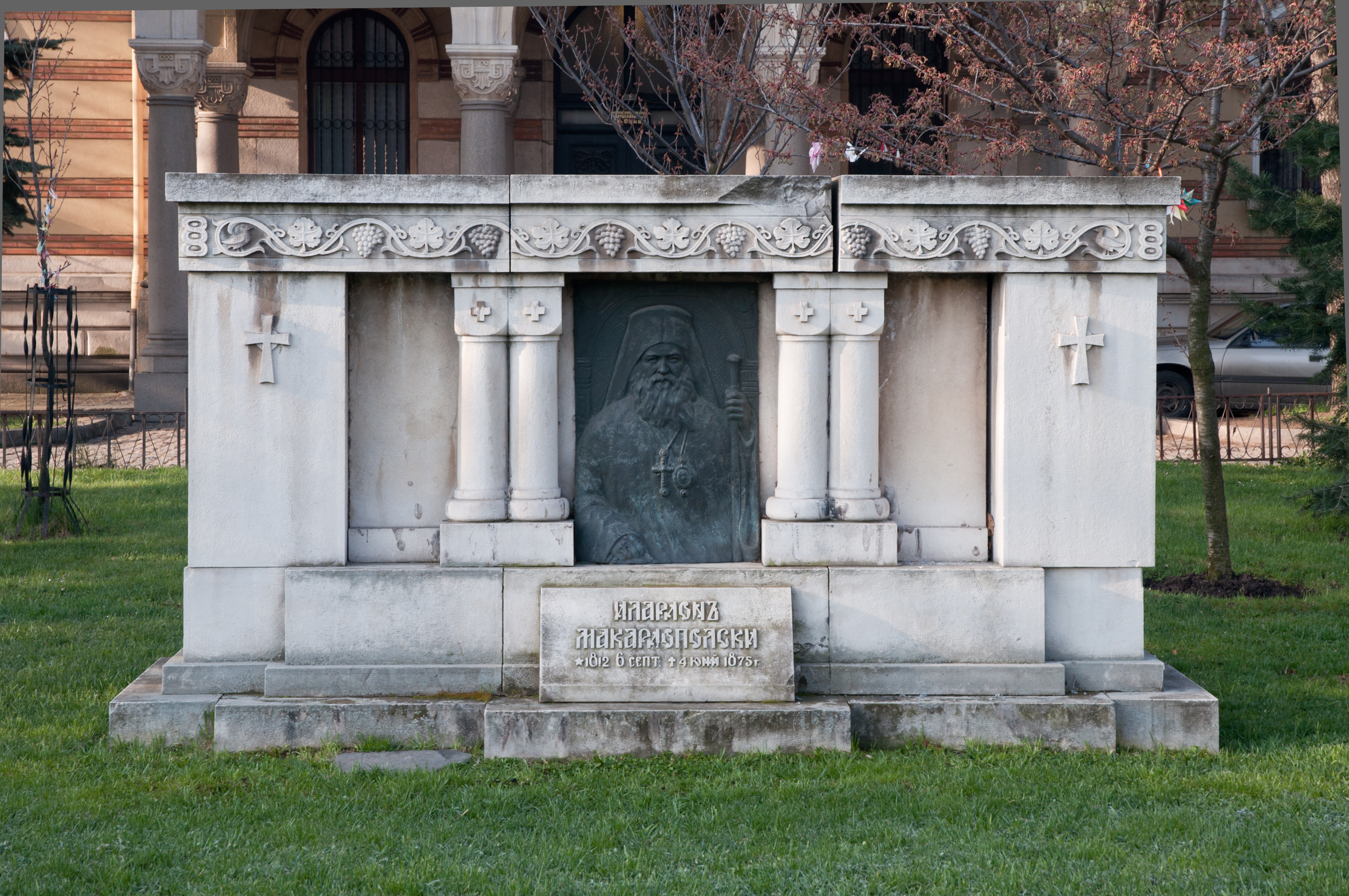
Ilarion Makariopolski monument in Sofia.

Hilarion of Makariopolis (Bulgarian: Иларион Макариополски Ilarion Makariopolski, Greek: Ιλαρίων Μακαριουπόλεως, born Stoyan Stoyanov Mihaylovski, Bulgarian: Стоян Стоянов Михайловски; 1812–1875) was a 19th-century Bulgarian cleric and one of the leaders of the struggle for an autonomous Bulgarian church.

He was born in Elena in 1812 to a prominent Bulgarian family. Mihaylovski received a substantial schooling for the period, initially in his native town and later at the Greek school in Arbanasi. He became a monk in the Hilandar Monastery on Mount Athos in 1832 and continued his education at the school of noted Greek enlightener Theophilos Kairis on the island of Andros, later studying for two years at a famous high school in Athens. A close friend of Georgi Rakovski, Ilarion Makariopolski took an active part in the Macedonian revolutionary society. Since 1844, he guided the Bulgarian church struggle from Constantinople together with Neofit Bozveli, and was exiled to Mount Athos between 1845 and 1850.

On 3 April 1860, during Easter service in Constantinople, Ilarion intentionally did not mention the name of the Patriarch of Constantinople, which, according to the canon law, is an act of throwing off his authority. A decision of the Patriarchate sent Makariopolski back to Mount Athos into exile in 1861–1864 together with the bishops that supported him, Auxentius of Veles and Paisius of Plovdiv.

After the Ottoman government of Abdülaziz granted the right to establish an autonomous Bulgarian Exarchate for the Bulgarian dioceses under the Sultan's firman promulgated on February 28 (the Julian calendar), 1870, Ilarion was a member of the Provisional Mixed Exarchic Council and of the first Synod.

Upon the unilateral declaration by Antim I of an independent national church of the Bulgarians in May 1872, Ilarion was anathematized by the Patriarchal Synod. The condemnation was later affirmed at the Council in Constantinople in September the same year.

Since 1872, he was Metropolitan of Tarnovo, and died in Constantinople on 4 June 1875. He was buried in the yard of the Bulgarian St Stephen Church in the city.

Ilarion Ridge in Breznik Heights on Greenwich Island in the South Shetland Islands, Antarctica, is named for Ilarion Makariopolski.
