= Mısır Apartment =

Historical building in Istanbul

- Mısır Apartmanı
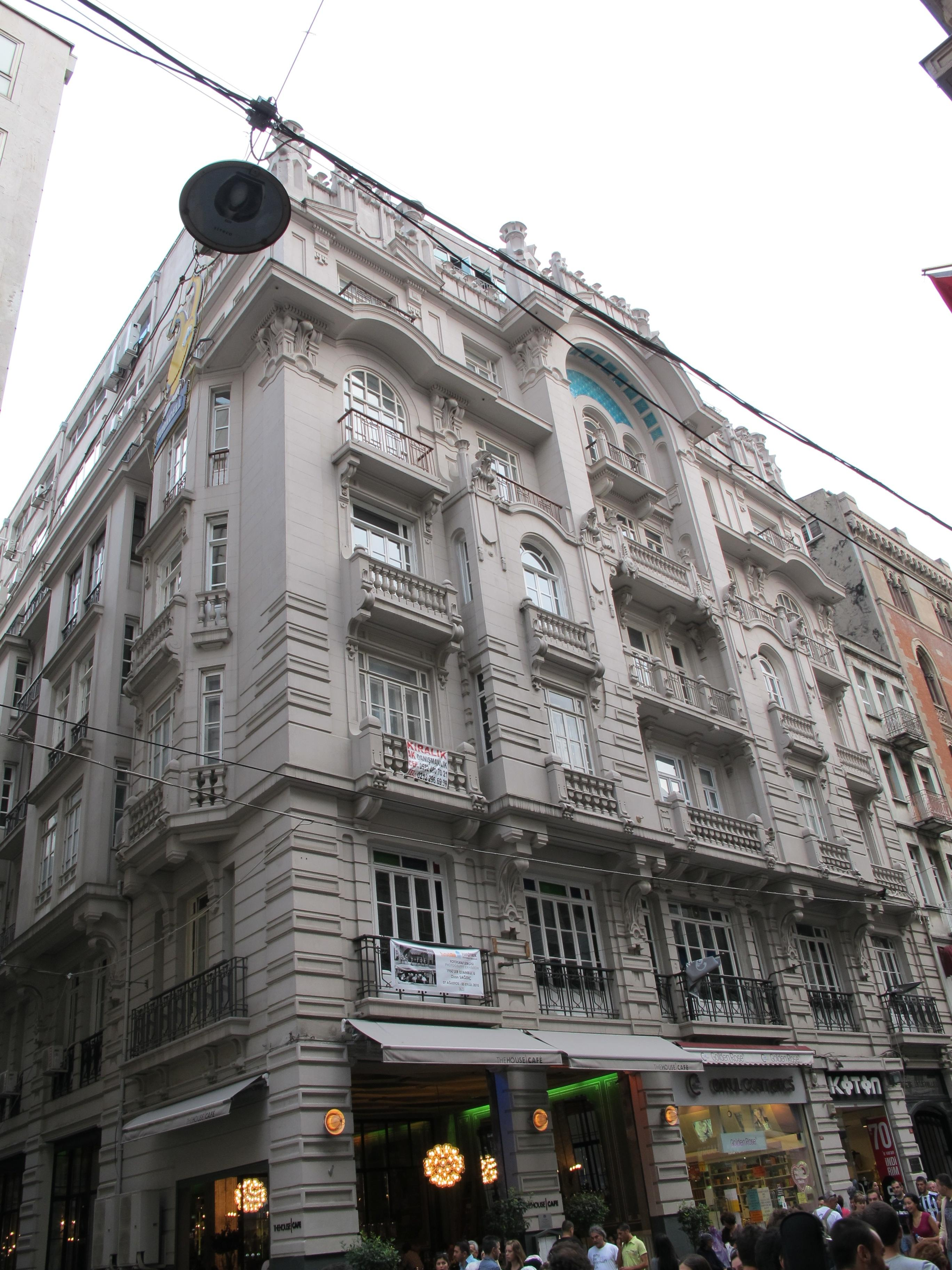
- Interactive map of the Mısır Apartment area

General information
- Architectural style: Art Nouveau
- Location: Turkey
- Coordinates: 41°01′57″N 28°58′36″E
- Construction started: 1905
- Completed: 1910; 116 years ago

Design and construction
- Architect: Hovsep Aznavur

The Mısır Apartment or Mısır Apartmanı (Turkish for "Egypt Apartment") is a famed historical building on the renowned İstiklal Avenue in the Beyoğlu district of Istanbul, Turkey. Over the years, the building has hosted numerous notable persons and businesses, including Mehmet Akif Ersoy, Lazzaro Franko, Su Baykal, and Hüsamettin Cindoruk. It is considered one of the notable examples of Art Nouveau style architecture in Istanbul and was a popular spot for the high society of the city.

== History ==
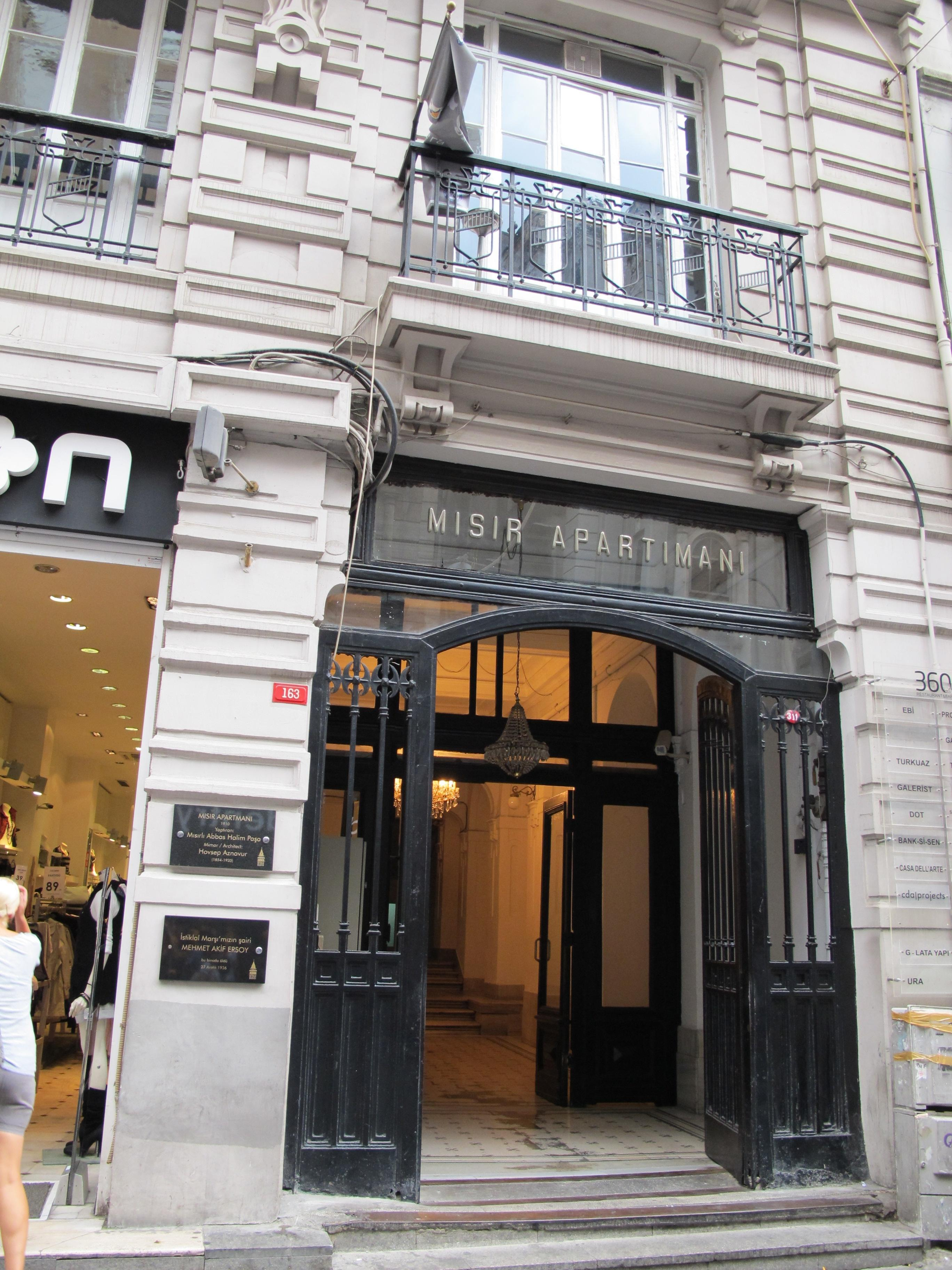
Entrance of the apartment

The apartment was built in 1910 by Ottoman Armenian architect Hovsep Aznavur and commissioned by Abbas Halim Pasha. The building was built as a winter residence for Abbas and was used by him and his family for many years.

It is now home to an art gallery featuring many art events and exhibitions.

== Notable residents and proprietors ==
- Abbas Halim Pasha – Ottoman-Egyptian prince and statesman.
- Mehmet Akif Ersoy – writer of the lyrics to the national anthem of Turkey. He died in the apartment on Sunday, December 27, 1936.
- Arşak Sürenyan - Dentist of Mustafa Kemal Atatürk. Grandfather of businessman and former chairman of the Turkish sports club Galatasaray Faruk Suren. He was of Armenian descent.
- Hüsamettin Cindoruk – had an office in the building.
- Canan Yaka – famed fashion designer.
- Lütfiye Arıbal – Renowned wedding gown designer.
- Mithat Cemal Kuntay – Writer and poet. Resident of the apartment.
- Sami Günzberg – Notable dentist.
- Iraïda Barry — Sculptor and author of Russian descent.
