= Neofit Bozveli =

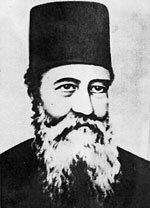
Neofit Bozveli (c. 1785-1848)

Neofit Bozveli (Bulgarian: Неофит Бозвели) (c. 1785 – 4 June 1848) was a Bulgarian cleric and enlightener and one of the leaders of the Bulgarian Church struggle.

He was born in the lively sub-Balkan town of Kotel. Bozveli completed his basic education there and may well have been a student of Sophronius of Vratsa. He continued his education afterwards, then joined the Hilandar monastery on Mount Athos as a monk around 1803-1805. Towards 1813-1814 he settled in Svishtov, where he worked as an Eastern Orthodox priest and a teacher and began his enlightening activity by writing the Slavenobolgarskoe Detevodstvo pedagogical textbook in 1835. In this book, Bozveli spoke for secular education, for the enforcement of spoken Bulgarian in the schools and for the establishment of public Bulgarian schools. Neofit Bozvely and Emanuil Vaskidovich wrote and published junior high school mathematical textbook "Guidance in Arithmetic" in 1835.

Around 1834-1835, Bozveli lived in the Principality of Serbia in order to print his textbook. In Serbia, he got acquainted with the ideas of earlier Serbian enlighteners such as Dositej Obradović and Zaharije Orfelin. As he returned to Bulgaria, he actively promoted the idea of an independent Bulgarian Orthodox Church. He moved to the Ottoman capital Constantinople in 1839 to head the struggle of the Bulgarian merchants and craftsmen against the Greek-dominated Ecumenical Patriarchate of Constantinople. The construction of the Bulgarian church in Constantinople and the establishment of the Bulgarian municipality in the city began on his initiative.

However, his patriotic acts were perceived as dangerous by the Patriarchate and he was exiled on Mount Athos in 1841 only to escape and return in 1844, where he continued the struggle together with his active and younger supporter Ilarion Makariopolski. In 1845, they were granted the rights to represent the Constantinople Bulgarians before the Ottoman government and the Patriarchate. In the same year, they sent two petitions to the Ottoman government, explaining the Bulgarian church demands. This caused the strong protest of the Patriarchate and they were both exiled again on Mount Athos, where Bozveli spent his last years in the Hilandar monastery. The church struggle was continued by Makariopolski and brought to a successful end with the establishment of the Bulgarian Exarchate on 28 February 1870 by the firman of Sultan Abdülaziz.

As a writer, Bozveli was the author of several imaginary dialogues between the personalized Fatherland and various members of the Bulgarian society. His most notable work is Plach bedniya Mati Bolgariya ("Wail of the poor Mother Bulgaria") that dates to 1846.

== Honour ==
Bozveli Peak on Graham Land in Antarctica is named after Neofit Bozveli.
