= Joseph I of Bulgaria =

Bulgarian Exarch

His Holiness Joseph I
- Bulgarian Exarch and Metropolitan of Lovech
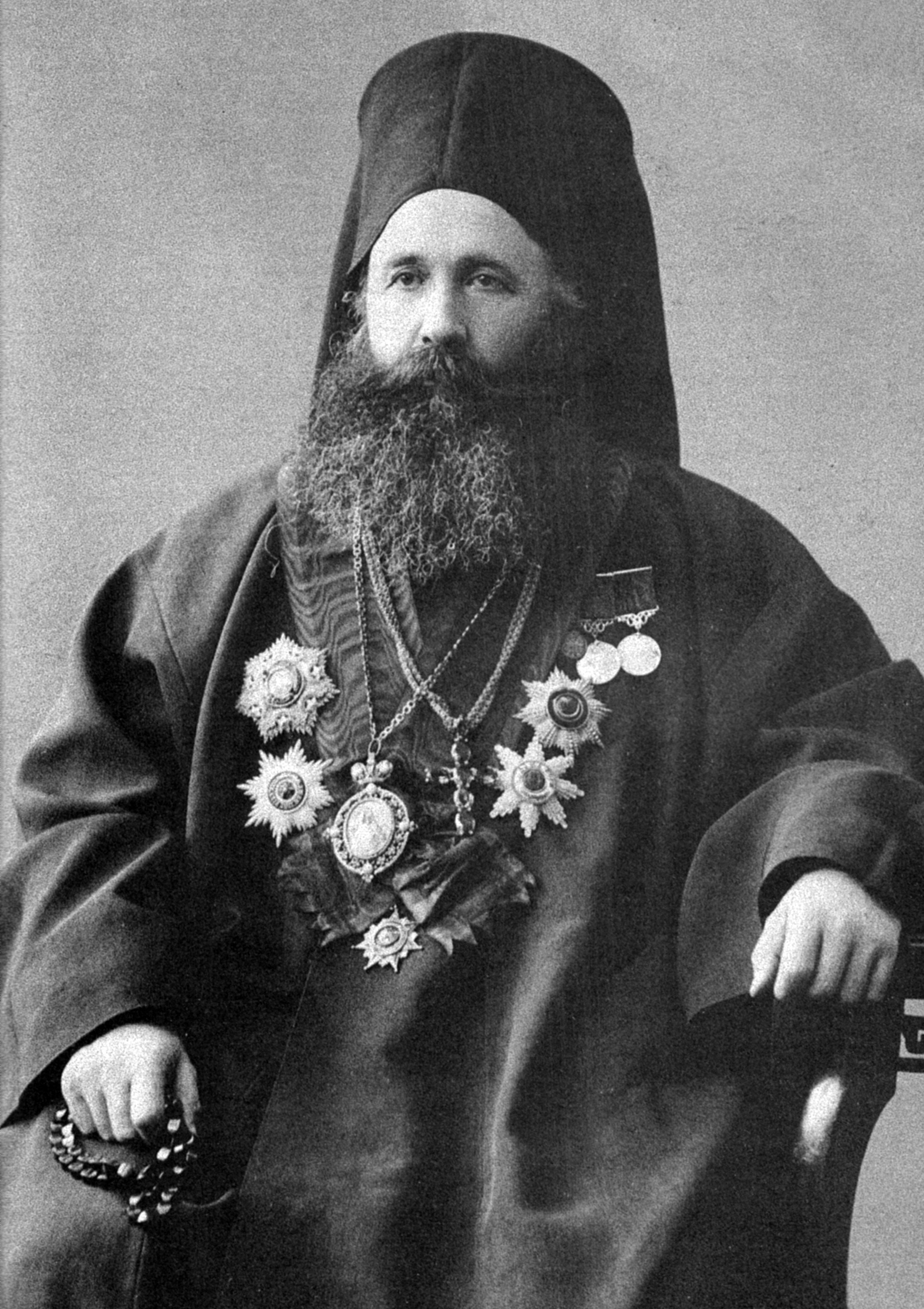
- Church: Bulgarian Orthodox Church (Bulgarian Exarchate)
- See: Constantinople
- Installed: 24 April 1877
- Term ended: 20 June 1915
- Predecessor: Anthim I
- Successor: Parthenius

Personal details
- Born: Lazar Yovchev; May 5, 1840 Kalofer, Ottoman Empire
- Died: June 20, 1915 (aged 75) Sofia, Bulgaria
- Buried: St. Nedelya Church, Sofia
- Denomination: Eastern Orthodox Church
- Residence: Constantinople, Ottoman Empire

Exarch Joseph I (also known as Iosif I, secular name Lazar Yovchev, Bulgarian: Лазар Йовчев; May 5, 1840, Kalofer, Ottoman Empire – June 20, 1915, Sofia, Bulgaria) was a Bulgarian Exarch from 1877 to 1915. He has great merits for preserving the unity of the Bulgarian Orthodox Church and for the Bulgarian educational and ecclesiastical work in Macedonia and Thrace, which remained in the Ottoman Empire after 1878.

His grave is marked with a white cross and a bed with flowers, it is located on the south side of the church "St. Nedelya" in Sofia, near the side altar door.
