= Anthim I =

Bulgarian Eastern Orthodox priest (1816–1888)

His Holiness Anthim I
- Bulgarian Exarch
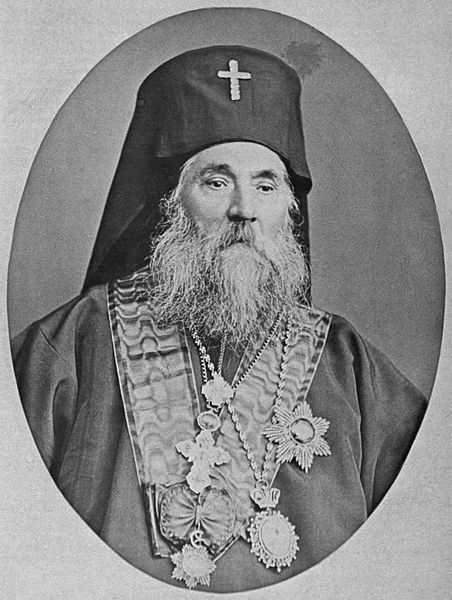
- Church: Bulgarian Orthodox Church (Bulgarian Exarchate)
- See: Constantinople
- Installed: 16 February 1872
- Term ended: 14 April 1877
- Predecessor: Hilarion of Lovech
- Successor: Joseph I of Bulgaria

Personal details
- Born: Atanas Mihaylov Chalakov; 1816 Kırk Kilise, Ottoman Empire
- Died: December 1, 1888 (aged 72) Vidin, Bulgaria
- Buried: Vidin
- Denomination: Eastern Orthodox Church
- Residence: Constantinople, Ottoman Empire

Anthim I (Anthim The First) (Bulgarian: Антим I, secular name Atanas Mihaylov Chalakov, Bulgarian: Aтанас Михайлов Чалъков; 1816 – 1 December 1888) was a Bulgarian education figure and clergyman, and a participant in the Bulgarian liberation and church-independence movement. He was the first head of the Bulgarian Exarchate, a post he held from 1872 to 1877. He was also the first Chairman of the National Assembly of Bulgaria, presiding the Constituent Assembly and the 1st Grand National Assembly in 1879.

== Life ==
Anthim I was born in Kırk Kilise (Lozengrad) in Eastern Thrace (today Kırklareli, Turkey) and became a monk in the Hilendar monastery on Mount Athos.

He studied in the Halki seminary (on the Princes' Islands near Constantinople), in Odessa as well as in Russia. He graduated from the Moscow Theological Academy (in Troitse-Sergiyeva Lavra) in 1856. He was ordained hieromonk by Metropolitan of Moscow Philaret Drozdov.

He was Archbishop of Preslav (from 1861) and then of Vidin (from 1868).

After he unilaterally declared an independent national church of the Bulgarians on May 11, 1872, he was defrocked by the Patriarchal Synod, under whose canonical jurisdiction he had been consecrated bishop. The condemnation was later affirmed at the Council in Constantinople in September the same year.

He died in Vidin in 1888 and his mausoleum can be found in the yard of the Vidin Archbishopric.

== Honour ==
Antim Peak in Imeon Range on Smith Island in the South Shetland Islands, Antarctica is named for Antim I.
