= Bible translations into Macedonian =

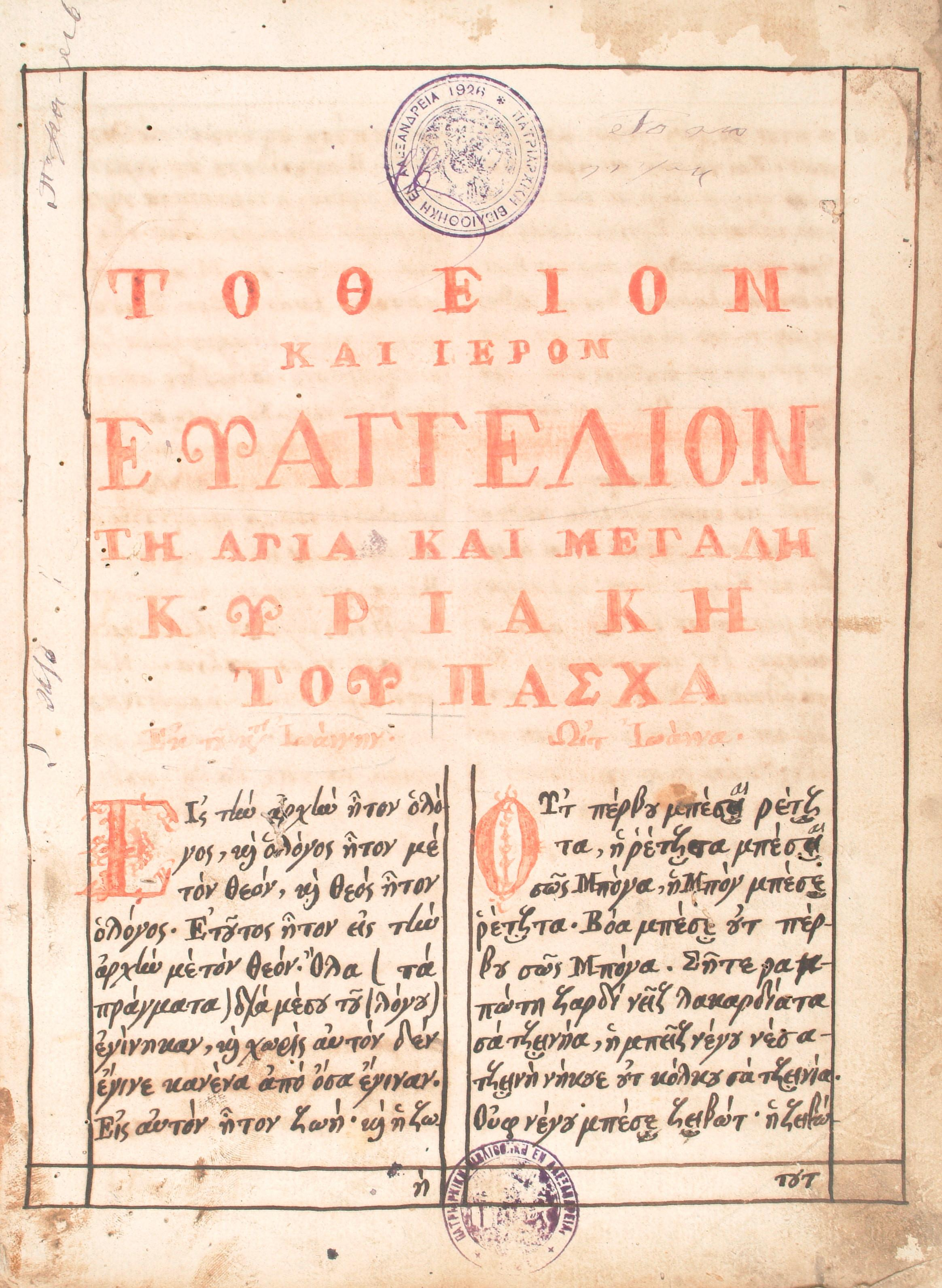
First Konikovo bilingual gospel in Greek and Macedonian vernacular. This manuscript is from the eve of the 19th century.

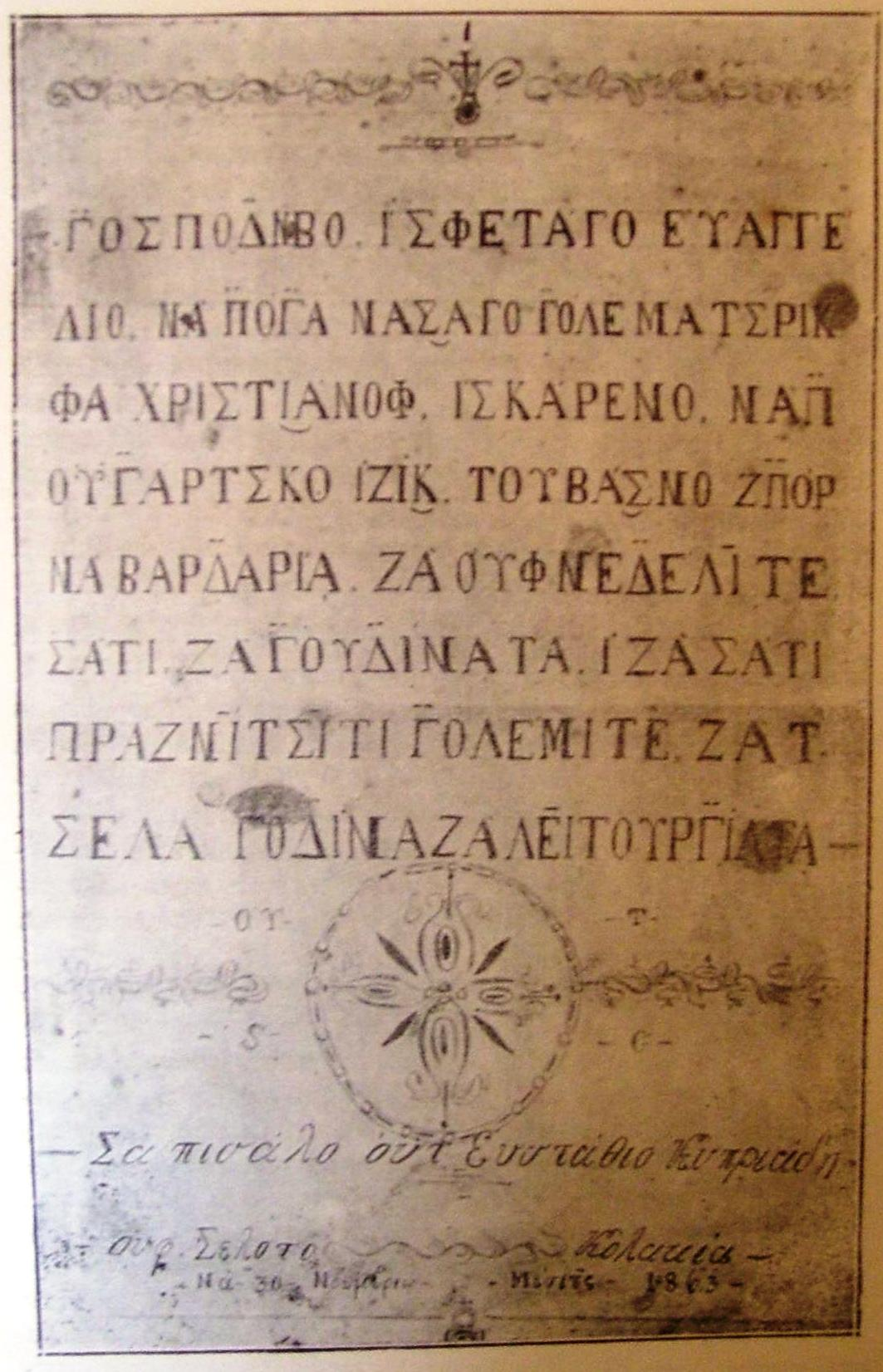
The Kulakian Gospel (1863) title page published in the book "Български старини от Македония", Йордан Иванов, 1931.

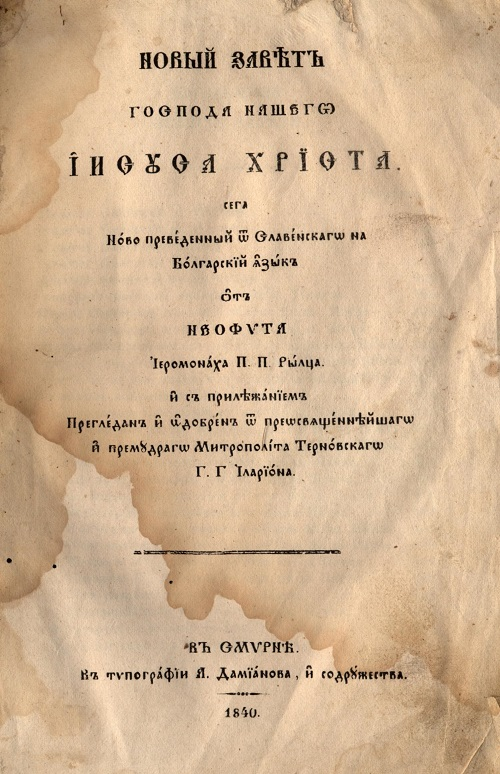
A cover from the New Testament translated by Neofit Rilski in 1838, and published in 1840. He is regarded to be the first to translate the New Testament into modern Bulgarian.

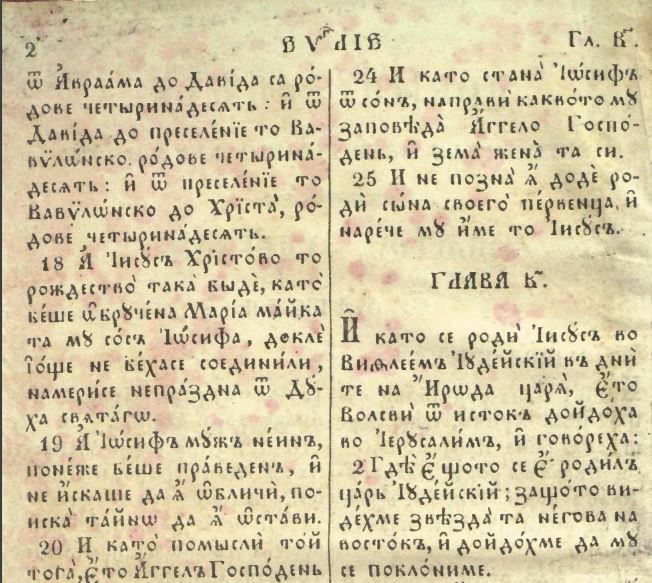
A page from the New Testament translated by Neofit Rilski in 1838, The Gospel of Matthew, chapter two.

The history of Bible translations into Macedonian is connected in its early years with the history of Bible translations into Bulgarian. After the codification of Macedonian in 1945, in 1952 a liturgical edition of the four Gospels was printed as the first official translation into standard Macedonian.

== Historic translations ==
The manuscript of the Konikovo Gospel is the oldest known Bible translation into modern Macedonian vernacular. It is a Greek vernacular-based evangeliarium with a translation to the Macedonian vernacular of Lower Vardar, from the eve of the 19th century. The manuscript, written by an anonymous translator who used Greek script for both the Greek and the Macedonian text, was discovered in 2003 in the library of the Greek Orthodox Patriarchate of Alexandria.

Here is a sample from this translation, John 1:1-3

Greek script	Cyrillic script
Ωἰτ Ιωάννα. Οὐτ πέρβȣ μπέσ̮ει ρὲτζ̮τα, ἡ ῥέτζ̮τα μπέσ̮ει σῶς Μπόγα, ἡ Μπὸγ μπέσ̮ε ῥέτζ̮τα• Βόα μπέσ̮ε ȣ̓τ πέρβȣ σῶς Μπόγα. Σῆτε ραμπώτη ζαρδὶ νεῖζ λακαρδίατα σὰ τζ̮εινήα, ἡ μπεῖζ νέγȣ νέ σα τζεινὴ νήκȣε ȣ̓τ κόλκȣ σὰ τζ̮εινία.	От Иоа́нна. Ут пе́рву бе́ши ре́чта, и ре́чта бе́ши со̂с Бо́га, и Бо́г бе́ше ре́чта. Во́а бе́ше утпе́рву со̂с Бо́га. Сѝте рабо́ти зарди́ нѝз лакарди́ата са́ чини́а, и бѝз не́гу не́ са чини́ ни́куе ут ко́лку са́ чини́а.

In 1835 the Bulgarian monk Neofit Rilski started a translation of the New Testament. The translation was completed on April 18, 1838. Per author himself, it was done in Bulgarian language, and de facto in the Maleševo-Pirin dialect, which is transitional between Bulgarian and Macedonian. In 1840 this complete translation of the New Testament was printed in Smyrna by the British and Foreign Bible Society. In this way, the first standardized Bulgarian script was created by Elias Riggs and Albert Long. It was based on the local dialect in Eastern Macedonia, today part of Pirin Macedonia, Bulgaria.

Here is a small sample from this translation, Matthew 2:1-2 using the modern Macedonian orthography:

1. И като се роди Исус во Витлеем Јудејскиј в дните на Ирода цара, ето волсви от исток дојдоха во Иерусалим и говореха:
2. Где е штото се е родил цар Јудејскиј; заштото видехме звездата негова на восток и дојдохме да му се поклониме.

In 1852 Pavel Bozhigrobski printed the first four pages of the Konikovo Gospel in Solun. In the original the language was not named, but in the version published by Bozhigrobski he calls it "Bulgarian". The printed version was republished in transcription in 1917, 1922 and 1931 by Bulgarian researchers.

Another example is the Kulakian gospel from 1863, which represents translation from Greek evangeliarium to Solun-Voden dialect and was written by hand with Greek letters from Evstati Kipriadi in the town of Chalastra. On the title page is also inscription "Written in Bulgarian language".

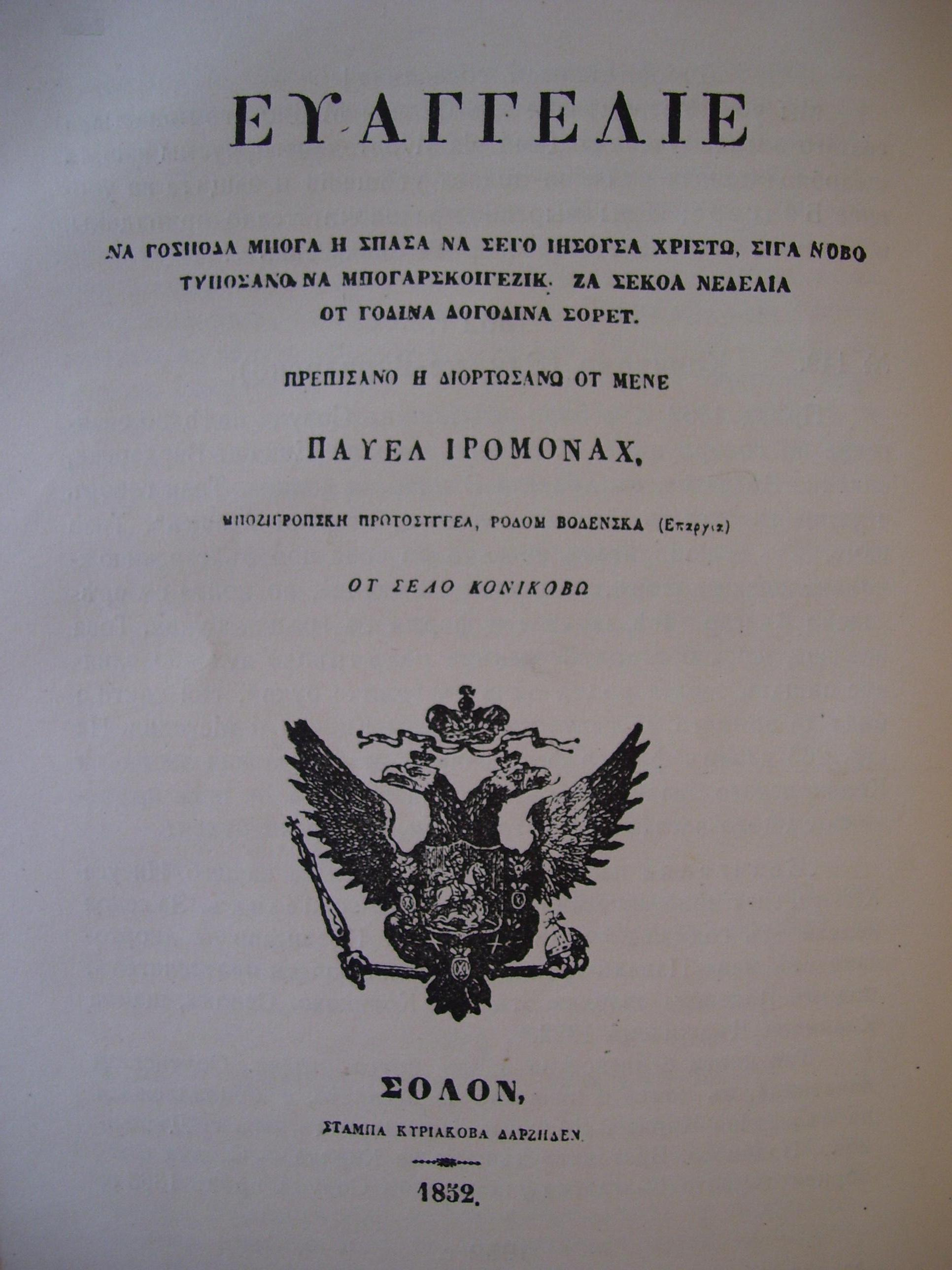
The second Konikovo Gospel from 1852. Title page published in the book "Български старини от Македония", Йордан Иванов, С. 1931, с. 182.

For Bulgarian researchers these early vernacular Slavic translations of the gospel into Macedonian dialects belong to the Bulgarian cultural tradition. In 1871 the first official Bible translation in Bulgarian was published. The decision to base it on the Eastern Bulgarian dialects, was one of the decisive historical factors based on which the standard Bulgarian language departed from its Western and Macedonian dialects.

== Official translations ==
In 1952 a liturgical edition of the four Gospels was printed. This was translated by Gjorgi Milošev with the help of the Macedonian Committee of the Orthodox Church. In 1957 further selections based upon the lectionary readings were published. In 1959 the Gospels of Matthew, Mark, Luke and John, translated by Georgi Milošev, Boris Boskovski and Petar Ilijevski was published by the British and Foreign Bible Society (BFBS). The first complete New Testament translated into Macedonian was then completed and published in 1967. In 1970 the Bible Society printed an edition with cross-references following the verses. Another edition was printed in Belgrade in 1988 by the Yugoslav office of the United Bible Societies (UBS).

The whole Bible (including the Deuterocanonical books) translated in Macedonian by the Archbishop Gavril was printed in 1990. This was published by the Bible Society and it has the official sanction of the Macedonian Orthodox Church. An audio edition of the 1990 New Testament was produced.

The text was revised in 2006 and called the Macedonian Standard Bible. This was printed in 2 editions, one without the deuterocanonical books and one with them, which has the official sanction of the Macedonian Orthodox Church. These have been digitised by the Bible Society and the 2006 editions are now on YouVersion as MK2006 and MK2006D. The Bible Society launched a Macedonian Bible app which was launched in Skopje in October 2016. This is available on Android, iPhone and Google platforms. An audio edition of the New Testament was also produced.

In 2008 the Orthodox Church edited the 1952 liturgical 4 Gospels to produce a new edition used with their lectionary and liturgy.

== Independent translations ==
An independent translation of the complete Bible was prepared by Duško Konstantinov in the mid 1970s, but it was not printed until 1996 by the George Lucas Educational Foundation. A dynamic translation of the New Testament prepared by Ivan Grozdanov and Goran Stojanov was published in 1999 under the umbrella of Biblica. Jehovah's Witnesses have translated their New World Translation of the Holy Scriptures from English into Macedonian.

== See also ==
- Slavic translations of the Bible
- Eastern South Slavic
