= Ivan Bogorov =

Bulgarian encyclopedist (1818–1892)

Sketch of Ivan Bogorov

Ivan Bogorov (Bulgarian: Иван Богоров; 1818 – 1 November 1892) was a Bulgarian encyclopedist from the time of the National Revival. Educated in medicine, he also worked in the spheres of industry, economy, transport, geography, journalism and linguistics.

== Biography ==
He was born in Karlovo in 1818. Bogorov studied at the Phanar Greek Orthodox College in Istanbul, and at 19 he moved to Odessa to study at the Richelieu High School. In 1841, he published the Bulgarian coat of arms from Hristofor Zhefarovich's Stemmatographia (1741). For some time, Bogorov travelled to Bucharest, Svishtov, Veliko Tarnovo, Kazanlak (which he called "Izvornik") and Gabrovo before settling in Stara Zagora ("Veta Zagora"). He promoted education in Bulgarian as opposed to Greek during his journeys. In Stara Zagora, he wrote the first Bulgarian grammar book, which he printed in Bucharest in 1844. He then moved to Leipzig ("Lipiska"), where he issued the first Bulgarian newspaper, Balgarskiy orel (Bulgarian Eagle) in 1846, two years after Konstantin Fotinov's first Bulgarian magazine, Lyuboslovie. Bogorov returned to Istanbul, where he worked for the Tsarigradski Vestnik newspaper, and then moved to Paris to study medicine. After that, Bogorov settled in Plovdiv to work as a doctor. There, he also issued the Journal for Science, Handicrafts and Trade. He participated in the release of several other newspapers, journals and books, and prepared the Academic Bulgarian Dictionary and the first French-Bulgarian (1869) and Bulgarian-French (1871) dictionary. Bogorov also translated Daniel Defoe's Robinson Crusoe into Bulgarian and issued a collection of Bulgarian folk songs (1842). He also authored a book on the geography of the European part of the Ottoman Empire.

Bogorov was known as a passionate defender of linguistic purism, and in his attempts to counter Greek and Russian influence on Bulgarian he introduced a number of rare dialectal words and neologisms to the literary language. Although many of these were considered amusing and funny-sounding by his contemporaries, a large number have successfully become an inseparable part of Bulgarian vocabulary.
