= Hristo Uzunov =

Macedonian Bulgarian revolutionary

Voivode Hristo Uzunov
- Христо Узунов
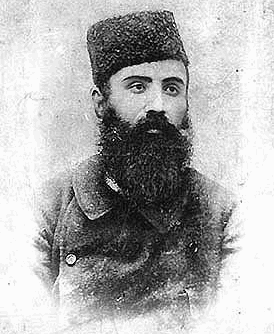
- Hristo Uzunov c. 1900
- Born: Христо Димитров Узунов; 22 February 1878; Ohrid, Ottoman Empire (present-day North Macedonia)
- Died: 24 April 1905 (aged 27); Cer, Ottoman Empire (present-day North Macedonia)
- Burial place: Cer, North Macedonia
- Education: Bulgarian Men's High School of Thessaloniki
- Relatives: Anastasia Uzunova (mother)
- Military career
- Allegiance: IMARO
- Service years: 1896-1905
- Commands: Ohrid Branch of the IMARO
- Conflicts: Ilinden Uprising; Macedonian Struggle †
- Other work: Teacher

Hristo Dimitrov Uzunov (Bulgarian/Macedonian: Христо Димитров Узунов; 22 February 1878 – 24 April 1905) was a Macedonian Bulgarian teacher and revolutionary, head of the Ohrid branch of the Internal Macedonian Revolutionary Organization and its ideological leader in the Ohrid region.

== Revolutionary life ==
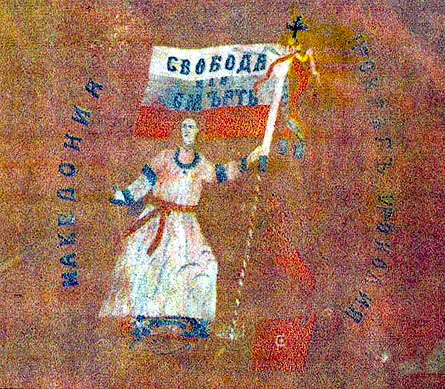
The banner of Uzunov's cheta with maid waving Bulgarian flag with inscription: "Свобода или смърть" in older Bulgarian orthography.

Uzunov was born in 1878 in Ohrid, then in Ottoman Empire. Both his father and mother were active at the Bulgarian national movement. After the establishment of the Principality of Bulgaria, his father moved to Sofia and worked as a librarian in the National Library. Uzunov became a member of the revolutionary movement in 1896, while he was studying at the Bulgarian Men's High School of Thessaloniki. Afterwards, he worked as a teacher in the Bulgarian Exarchate. After the murder of Dimitar Grdanov, a Serbian teacher in Ohrid by Metody Patchev, Uzunov, along with Patchev, Kiril Parlichev and Ivan Grupchev were arrested. Between January 1902 and March 1903 he was re-imprisoned in Bitola. He actively participated in the Ilinden Uprising in 1903. After Toma Davidov was killed in March 1903, Uzunov took over the leadership of the revolutionary organization in the Ohrid area.

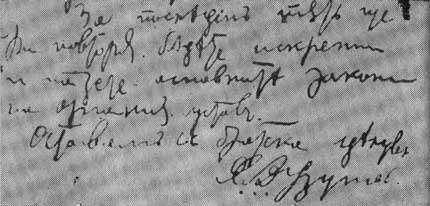
Excerpt from Uzunov's death note (in Bulgarian).

On 23 July 1903, in the village of Kuratica, near Ohrid, the flag of Uzunov's cheta was consecrated. The flag was handed over to Uzunov and with it the regional cheta. Uzunov, along with his cheta, participated in the Ilinden Uprising. Between 1904 and 1905 he fought against Serbian guerrillas in Macedonia and tried to resolve of the organization's internal problems.

== Death ==
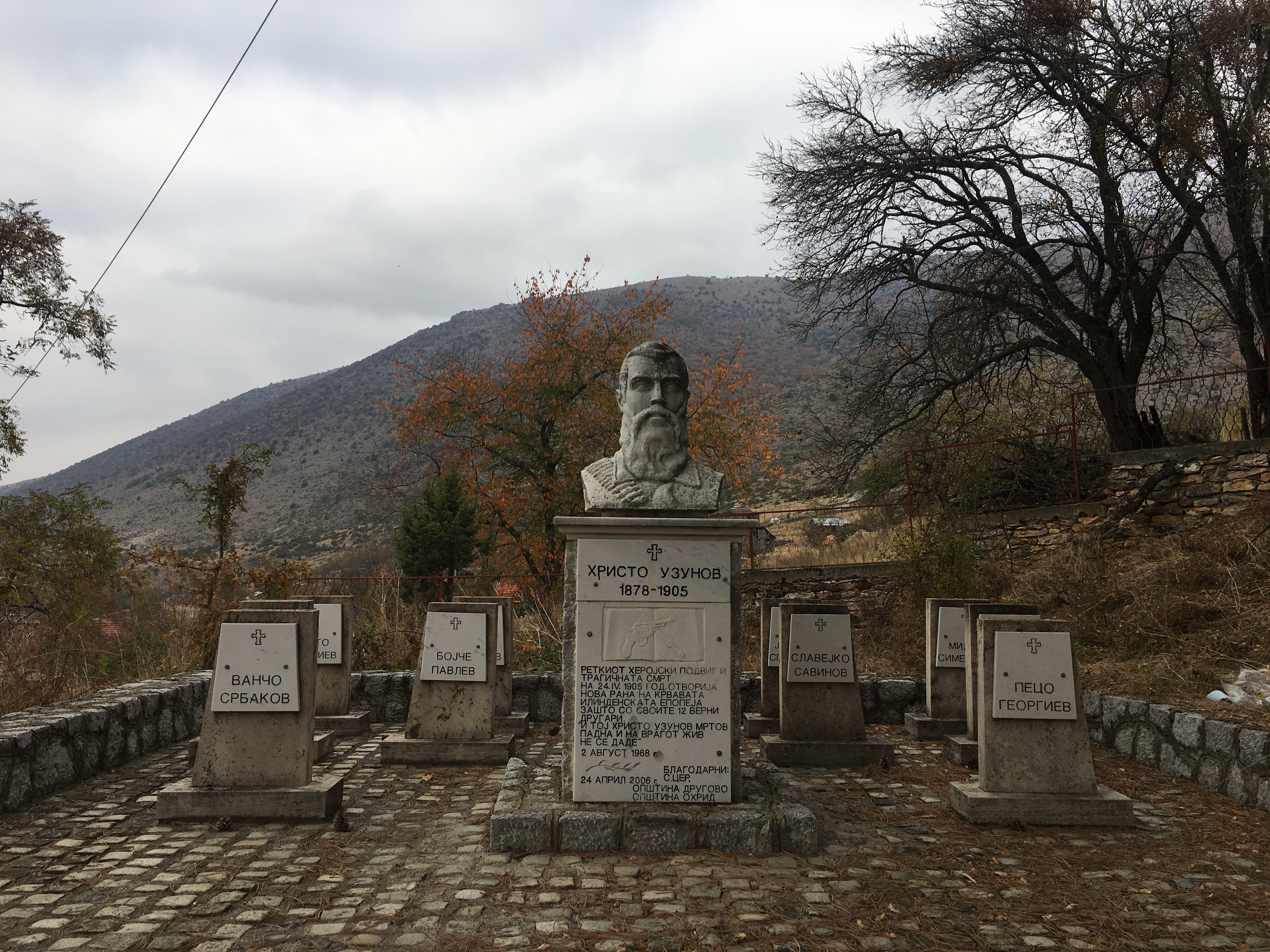
The graves of Hristo Uzunov and his men.

In 1905 Uzunov went to Bitola and Kičevo with his cheta in order to gain control of the region. On 23 April 1905, they entered the village of Cer together with Vancho Sarbakov. On the night of 24 April they were surrounded by Ottoman forces and after using all of their ammunition, they decided to commit suicide. Prior to committing suicide, Uzunov wrote a short letter addressed to all honourable revolutionaries.

He's buried in Cer, where he died.
