= Union of Evangelical Congregational Churches in Bulgaria =

The Union of Evangelical Congregational Churches (SESC) is an organisation representing the first evangelical churches in Bulgaria. Their origins date back to the time of the Bulgarian Renaissance (1888).

The purpose of the SESC is to coordinate and support the activities of local churches in the fulfilment of the great commandment of the Lord Jesus Christ contextualised for Bulgaria – to make disciples among all citizens of the Republic of Bulgaria and teach them Christ’s commandments. As basic values for every born-again Christian, the SESC promotes faith in Christ as Lord and Saviour, the Bible as God’s Word and guide for moral life, and the hope for the coming of Christ.

== History ==
=== Beginnings ===
American missionaries founded the Congregational Churches in Bulgaria 150 years ago when Bulgaria was part of the Ottoman Empire. The mission developed from the work of the American Board of Commissioners for Foreign Missions. In 1819, the Congregationalists and Presbyterians begun to consider mission to Bulgaria. The New Jersey born missionary Rev. Elias Riggs, he became influential in the translation of the Bible into the Bulgarian language. In Smyrna, 2,000 copies of the New Testament were sold. The first evangelists were Rev. Cyrus Hamlin and Christipher Rhinelander Robert arrived in 1857, they were followed by Rev. Wesley Prettyman, Albert Long, and Charles Morse. Hamlin and morse established 3 missionary centres in Plovdiv, Odrin and Stara Zagora. In 1859, the Russian born Frederic Flocken joined the work. The first church was founded in Plovdiv. The American evangelists served the country till the Second World War.

=== Evangelism ===
From 1840 to 1878, churches were founded in Bansko, Turnovo, Svishtov, Ludovic. In 1899, a congregation was also founded in Sofia. In the late 1800s, there were ten missionaries with 25 assistants. In southern Bulgaria, there were 19 congregations in 1909 and these churches formed a legal association. In 1926, the American College of Sofia was founded. Later, in 1931, an evangelical seminary was founded in the town. Till 1944, the Bulgarian culture toward Protestantism was intolerant. During the communist regime, the church experienced several hardships; in that time, there were 22 churches, now there are 40 and new churches are being planted every year. In 1948, pastors were arrested and imprisoned. and in 1949, Protestant churches were declared unlawful. All contacts with other Protestant were cut.

== International relationship ==
The Union of Evangelical Congregational Churches in Bulgaria is a member of the World Communion of Reformed Churches and of the World Evangelical Congregational Fellowship.

== Statistics ==
The church has approximately 35 congregations and 5,000 members in Bulgaria.
