= Sts. Constantine and Helen, Giannitsa =

Sts. Constantine and Helen
- Ιερός ναός Αγίων Κωνσταντίνου και Ελένης
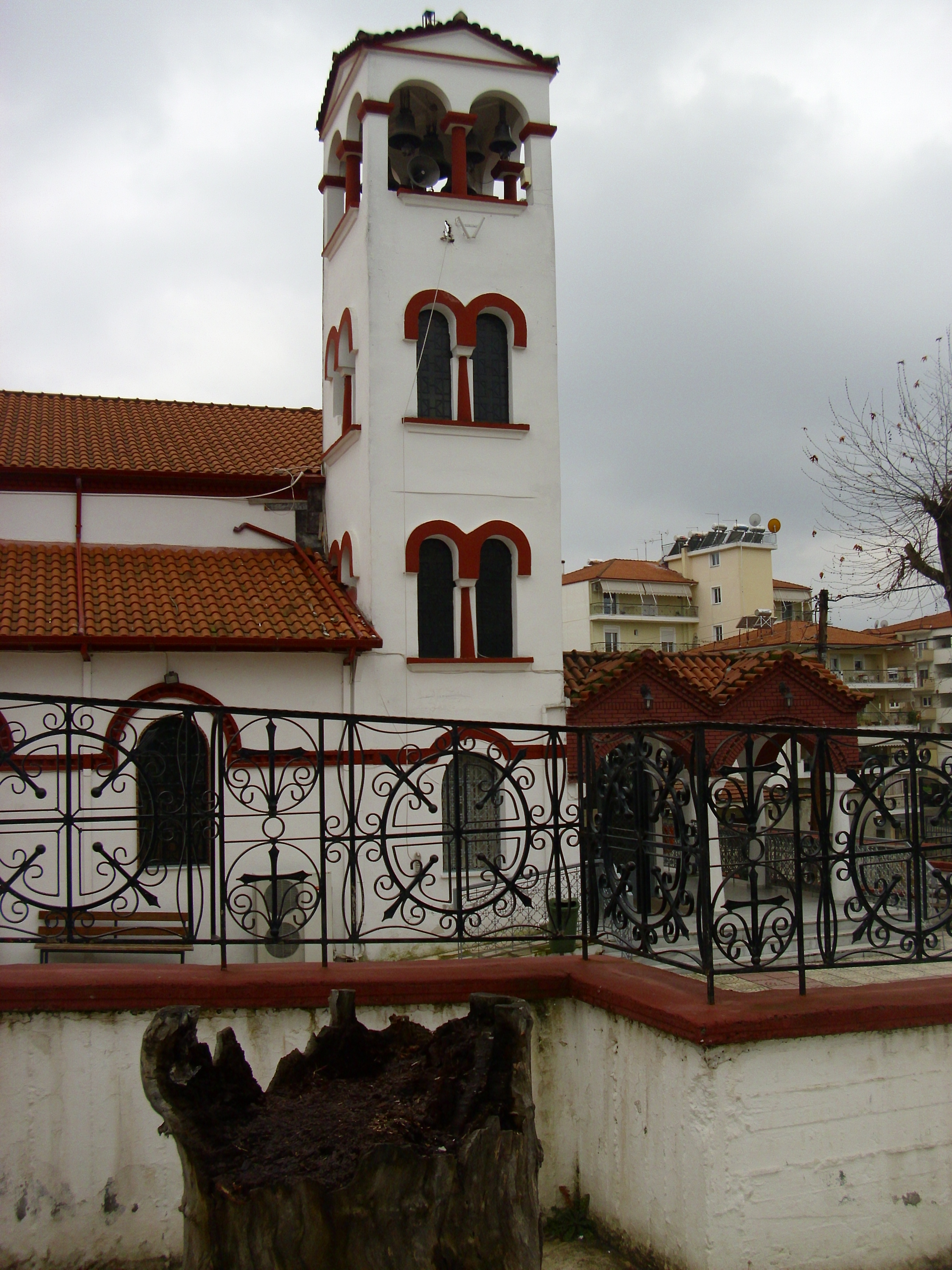
- The church in 2011

- Location of the church in Greece
- Sts. Constantine and Helen
- 40°47′51″N 22°25′4″E
- Location: Giannitsa, Central Macedonia
- Country: Greece
- Language: Greek
- Denomination: Greek Orthodox
- Previous denomination: Bulgarian Exarchate (1906–c. 1913)

History
- Former name(s): Sts. Cyril and Methodius (Bulgarian: Св. св. Кирил и Методий)
- Dedication: Constantine the Great and Helena, mother of Constantine I

Architecture
- Functional status: Active
- Completed: 7 december 1906

Specifications
- Materials: Stone

Administration
- Metropolis: Metropolis of Edessa, Pella and Almopia

The Sts. Constantine and Helen, Giannitsa (Greek: Ιερός ναός Αγίων Κωνσταντίνου και Ελένης) is a Greek Orthodox church in the town of Giannitsa, in the Central Macedonia region of northern Greece, dedicated to Saint Constantine the Great and his mother Helen, and belonging to the archdiocese of Edessa, Pella and Almopia. Built as a Bulgarian orthodox Sts. Cyril and Methodius (Bulgarian: Св. св. Кирил и Методий) church during the late Ottoman era, the building was converted into a Greek church following the incorporation of Giannitsa and the rest of Greek Macedonia into Greece in the early twentienth century.

== History ==
The first attempts to be open an Orthodox Bulgarian chapel in Yenice Vardar (Giannitsa) date back to 1891, when the school board of the Orthodox Bulgarians sent a letter to the Thessaloniki Bulgarian Municipality, explaining that a suitable house for conversion into a chapel had been found. The lack of a Bulgarian Orthodox church municipality thwarted this attempt. When it was established in January 1895, a Bulgarian chapel "Sts. Cyril and Methodius" was also opened after june of the same year with the voluntary donations of Archimandrite Nikolay, Dimitar Mihaylov, Trayan Kalinchanov, El. Ivanova, D. Galabov, T. Nedelkov, A. Atanasova, D. Popgeorgiev, Gligor Mokrev, Maria Dimitrova, El. Dimitrova, Katerina Bozhinova, grandmother Velika Mokreva, Bozhina Pozharlieva, Velika Gl. Mokreva, Maria Poptrayanova, Katerina Dimitrova and Maria Mitsova. The chapel began to operate until the end of the year, when the Nativity of Christ was celebrated there. On June 1, 1896, an application was submitted for the issuance of a foundation stone for the construction of a Bulgarian church next to the kaymakamam (ottoman turkish official). In April and May 1902, the chairman of the municipality, Archimandrite Dionysius, once again put the issue on the agenda with a letter to the Bulgarian Exarchate and to the Grand Vizier of the Sublime Porte.

In the first days of 1906, a sultan's decree was received for the construction of the Bulgarian church. It was allowed to be 18 m long, 12 m wide and 9 m high, with one bell tower instead of the originally planned two. The Bulgarian municipal authorities issued a protocol for the immediate start of the construction of the church. A specially created committee included Nikola Shkutov, Dine Garkov, Andon Popstavrev, Harish Bozhkov, Dionis Stankov, Hadzhi Dionish and Hristo Mandalchev, who managed to collect the initial 78 gold pounds and 25 groschen. The property on which the church was to be built was owned by Dimitar Trapkov, Valkoyanov and Georgi Kostov, who donated 752 arshins of land, and two more beds of 800 arshins were purchased for a total area of 1772 arshins. At a solemn event attended by over 500 people, the foundation stone was laid on March 12, 1906. The construction was the work of master Serafim Dichev, who determined the total cost of the construction at 81,900 gold groschen, with 10,389 groschen having been collected to date. Exarch Joseph sent a letter to the Bulgarian authorities, who allocated 300 Turkish liras from the Council of Ministers of the Principality of Bulgaria through the Bulgarian National Bank.

The temple was built in the Bulgarian neighborhood of Varosh in the northeastern part of the city on December 7, 1906, by the Enidje Vardar Bulgarian Municipality of the Bulgarian Exarchate under the name "Sts. Cyril and Methodius". In 1909, icon painters from Debar region, led by Apostol Hristov, painted the icons of the temple.

Georgi Bozhkov, local bulgarian from the city, wrote in his memoirs: "The construction of the new Bulgarian church "Cyril and Methodius" was helped not only by the citizens' funds, but also by the revolutionary tithe, part of which was set aside for this purpose. The church itself was built next to the Turkish cemetery "Karla Baba", from which our people stole the large stones that they placed in its foundation. For the consecration of the church, which took place in 1905, we wanted the Strumica bishop to come, but he refused because the Greeks did not agree and influenced the Turkish authorities to refuse. Thus, three churches were built in the city: the Greek "St. Bogoroytsa", the Bulgarian "St. Cyril and Methodius", which the Greeks later renamed "St. Constantine" and the Uniate "St. Peter and Paul”.“

After Enidze Vardar fell into Greece following the Balkan Wars, the temple was renamed “St. St. Constantine and Helena”.
