= Lyuboslovie =

Bulgarian literary magazine

Lyuboslovie (Bulgarian: Любословие meaning Philology in English) is the first Bulgarian literary magazine.

Released for the first time in 1842 from Konstantin Fotinov in Smyrna (İzmir). In 1842 Fotinov printed a test book with the title "Lyuboslovie or Periodical Magazine of Miscellaneous Conducts" in a small format in volume of 32 pages. It is known that Lyuboslovie was conceived and executed according to the model of the Greek magazine Repository for useful knowledge (Αποθήκη των ωφελίμων γνώσεων), published in Smyrna during the period from 1837 to 1844. The magazine was presented to the British Bible Society by Protestant missionaries who found it in Asia Minor (Anatolia). It ceased publication in 1846.
