= Dionysius of Giannitsa =

Dionysius

Personal life
- Born: 1831 Yenice Vardar, Ottoman empire
- Died: circa 1909 Yenice Vardar, Ottoman empire

Religious life
- Religion: Eastern Orthodoxy

Dionysius (Αρχιμανδρίτης Διονύσιος, архимандрит Дионисий) was a Bulgarian cleric, an activist of the Bulgarian Revival in South Macedonia.

== Biography ==
Dionysius was born in 1831 in Yenice Vardar, then in the Ottoman Empire, today in Greece. He received an enviable education and was ordained a priest by a Greek bishop in 1860. The following year, in 1861, he was ordained as the vicar of the Greek bishop of Voden in Yenice Vardar.

By June 1897, Dionysius had been the vicar of the Greek bishop of Voden in Enidze Vardar for 36 years. At that time, he expressed his desire to enter the service of the Bulgarian Exarchate on the condition that he be appointed chairman of the Enidze Vardar Bulgarian municipality, that he receive a teacher from the municipality as secretary and a Turk as a gavazin. In return, he promised that one of the Greek-speaking priests and his entire parish would join him, and in a short time, all the other patriarchs in the area. In November 1897, he submitted an official application for accession to the Exarchate. Archimandrite Dionysius had great influence among the population of the city and the district, as well as with the local authorities. He served as the chairman of the municipality from (de facto) 1897 to 1903. He successfully counteracted the emerging Serbian propaganda in the city and the Enidzhevardar Serbian Municipality.

By 1906 - 1907, Archimandrite Dionysius was a Bulgarian exarchate priest in Enidzhevardar together with Gono Traev, Mihail Dimitrov, Andon and Stavri.
