= Albert Long =

American methodist pastor

Albert Limerick Long
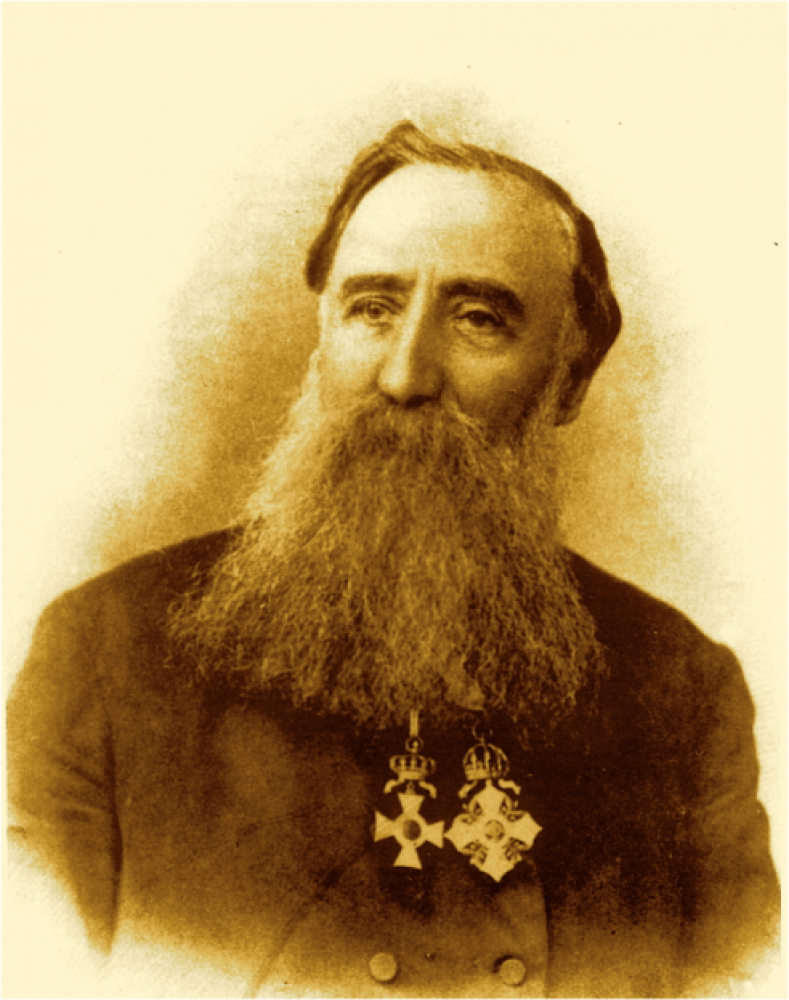
- Born: 4 December 1832; Washington, Pennsylvania, U.S.
- Died: 28 July 1901 (aged 68); Liverpool, England
- Resting place: St James Cemetery, Liverpool, England
- Education: Western University of Pennsylvania; Alleghany College; Concord Biblical Institute
- Occupations: educator; missionary
- Employer: Robert College
- Office: Vice-President of Robert College

Albert Long (December 4, 1832, Washington, Pennsylvania - July 28, 1901, Liverpool, England) was an American Methodist pastor who devoted much of his life preaching in the Balkans. During his missionary activities in the Ottoman Empire he contributed to the Bulgarian National Revival. Long's contributed significantly to the translation of the Bible in modern Bulgarian. This translation established the literary norms of the contemporary Bulgarian language.

== Biography ==
Albert Limerick Long was born on December 4, 1832, in Washington, Pennsylvania. He was the son of a highly respected clergyman. Among the schoolmates of his childhood were Andrew Carnegie and Matthew Quay. He was educated at Western University of Pennsylvania and at Alleghany College, Meadville, Pennsylvania. He also studied at the Concord Biblical Institute (now University of Boston). At the age of 24, he graduated with awards for his theological education and was invited to become a missionary to the Methodist Episcopal Church and to move to the Balkans. He accepted, and on June 27, 1857, he departed for the Ottoman Empire. During the three-month-long journey by ship, Long intensively studied Bulgarian. He used the first Bulgarian textbook for foreigners "Notes on Bulgarian Grammar", written by another missionary Elias Riggs. After his arrival, he settled in Shumen, now in Bulgaria, and began studying Greek and Turkish. Long befriended with the local intelligentsia. Two years later he moved to Tarnovo. In 1859 he established a Bulgarian Methodist Episcopal Church. In 1863 he moved to Constantinople, the Ottoman capital, to become the overseer of the Mission of the Methodist Episcopal Church for Bulgarian lands. He was one of the greatest advocates before the Ottoman authorities in favor of the Armenian cause during the massacre of 75,000 Armenians in 1896, part of the Hamidian massacres. Long personally translated the records of Archimandrite Metodi Kusev detailing the atrocities of the suppression of the 1876 April Uprising in Bulgaria and handed them over to a reporter of the Daily News. Again, he urged the US Consul General in Istanbul, Eugene Schuyler, to visit the town of Batak and to assure the credibility of the information about the Batak massacre. The actions of these men helped to form a casus belli for the 1877–1878 Russo-Turkish War, which led to Bulgarian liberation.

Long contributed greatly to the translation of the first edition of the Bible in modern Bulgarian language. Together with Dr. Elias Riggs, they made a translation using the former translation of Neofit Rilski. For twelve years they worked with Petko Slaveikov, Konstantin Fotinov and Hristodul Kostovich. In 1871 the first edition of the Bulgarian Bible was printed in Constantinople in semi-standardized Bulgarian language. From 1864 to 1872, Long edited and published the monthly magazine Zornitsa, the first Bulgarian Christian magazine. In 1870 Albert Long published a short history of the Bulgarians, under the title "The Slavs and the Bulgarians". From 1872 to 1901 he was professor of natural sciences at Robert College in Constantinople. He later became vice president of Robert College. He died at Liverpool, England on his journey to America on July 28, 1901. He was buried in St James Cemetery, Liverpool.

== Honours ==
- The National Assembly of liberated Bulgaria at their first session in 1879 accorded him a vote of thanks in recognition of his service to the Bulgarian cause.
- Commander of the Princely Order of Saint Alexander (Bulgaria).
- Streets in the Bulgarian cities of Sofia, Pazardzhik, Veliko Tarnovo, Panagyurishte are named after him. There is also a Methodist church named after Long in Sofia.
- The cultural center of the Boğaziçi University, Istanbul (formerly Robert College) is named after him.

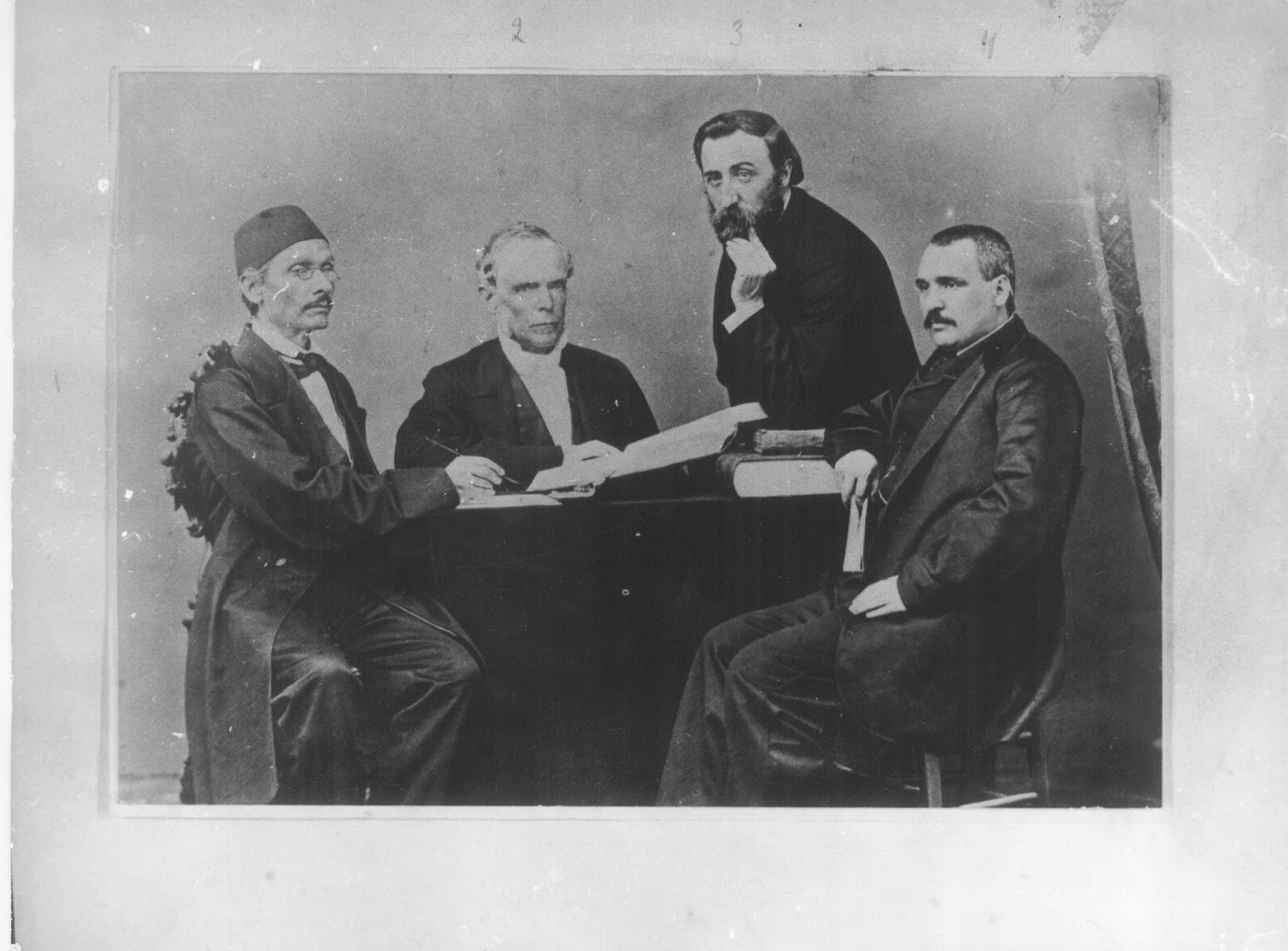
Christodul Costovich, Elias Riggs, Albert Long and Petko Slaveikov in Constantinople, circa 1864-1865

== See also ==
- Bible translations into Bulgarian
- Protestantism in Bulgaria
- Union of Evangelical Congregational Churches in Bulgaria
