= Anastasia Uzunova =

Bulgarian revolutionary (1862–1948)

- Анастасия Узунова
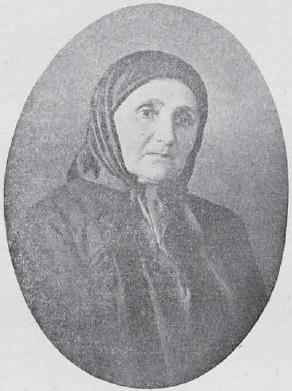
- Born: c. 1862; Struga, Ottoman Empire
- Died: 1948; Sofia, Bulgaria
- Burial place: Central Sofia Cemetery, Sofia, Bulgaria
- Occupation: Macedonian Bulgarian revolutionary
- Spouse: Dimitar Uzunov
- Children: 3, Hristo Uzunov, Andon Uzunov and Angel Uzunov

Anastasia Uzunova (Bulgarian: Анастасия Узунова, née Chakarov, 1862–1948) was a Macedonian Bulgarian revolutionary in the Bulgarian national movement.

== Family ==
Uzunova was born in 1862 in Macedonian Bulgarian city of Struga in the Ottoman Empire (today part of the Republic of North Macedonia). Her father was Georgi Chakarov [bg] of the old Struga revival family of Chakarov. Her siblings included Alexandar Chakarov [bg], Stanislav Chakarov [bg] and Slavka Pushkarova (née Chakarov) [bg], and she was the first cousin of the revolutionaries Hristo Matov and Milan Matov [bg].

Uzunova married Dimitar Uzunov [bg], Bulgarian teacher and fighter for an independent church, and they were both involved in the Bulgarian national movement. Their three children, Hristo Uzunov, Andon Uzunov [bg] and Angel Uzunov [bg], became activists with the Internal Macedonian Revolutionary Organization (IMRO, Bulgarian: Вътрешна македонска революционна организация (ВМРО).

From 1906, she lived with her son Angel in Kyustendil, Bulgaria.

== Revolutionary activity ==
Uzunova was the first female member of the IMRO. She later organised women in the IMRO in the Ohrid region, forming women's societies that supported the work of male revolutionaries and armed their detachments.

== Death ==
Uzunova died in 1948 in Sofia, Bulgaria, and was buried in the Central Sofia Cemetery.
