= Bible translations into Bulgarian =

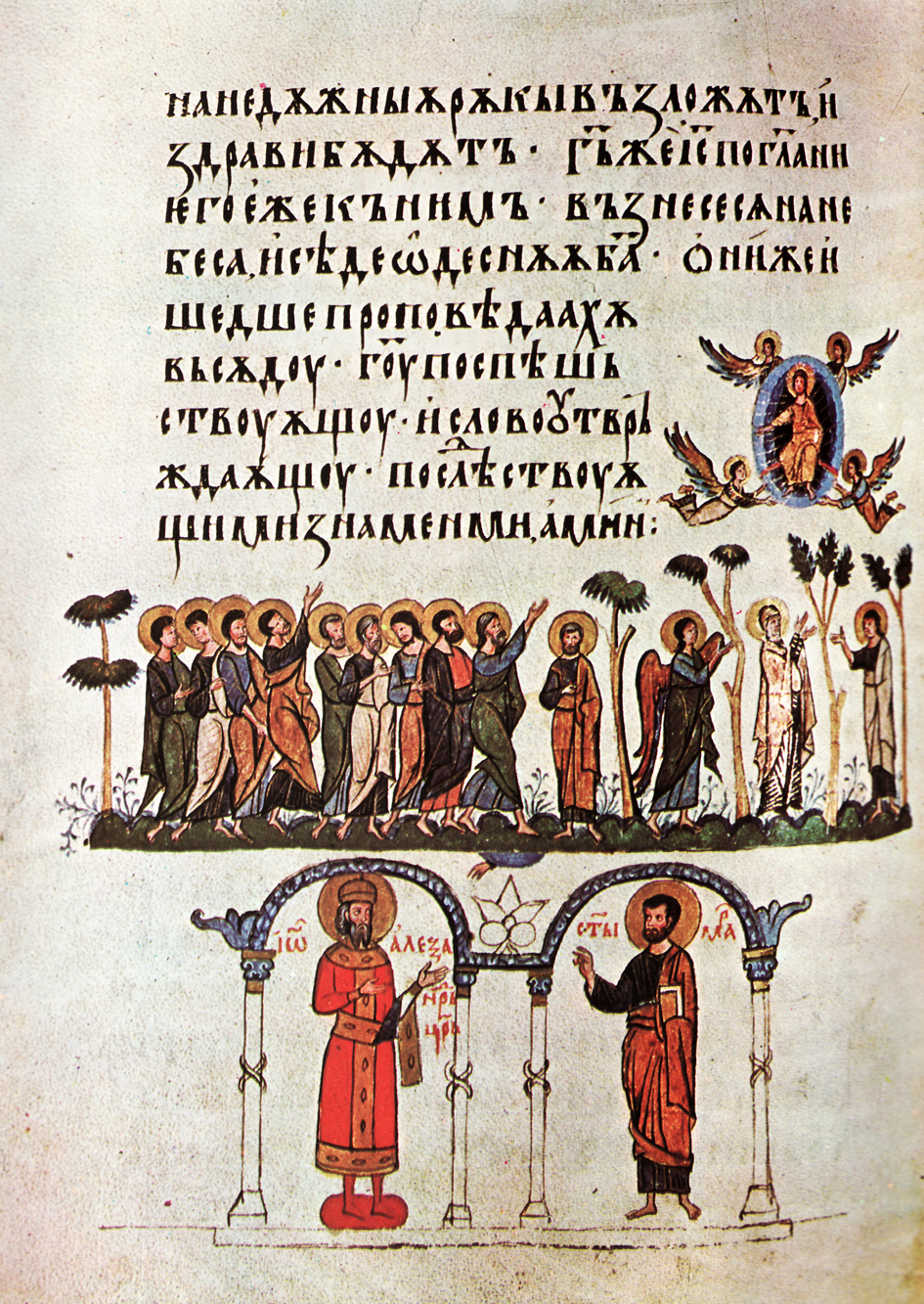
The four Gospels of Ivan Alexander from 1355–1356.

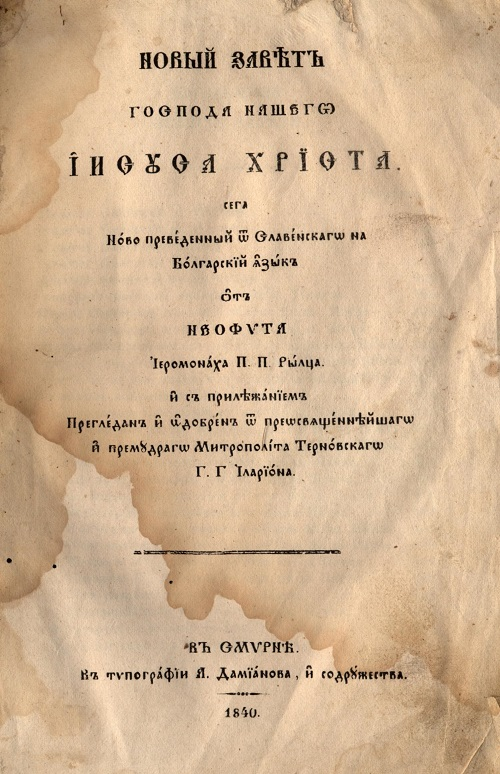
A cover from the New Testament translated by Neofit Rilski in 1838, and published in 1840. He is regarded to be the first to translate the New Testament into modern Bulgarian.

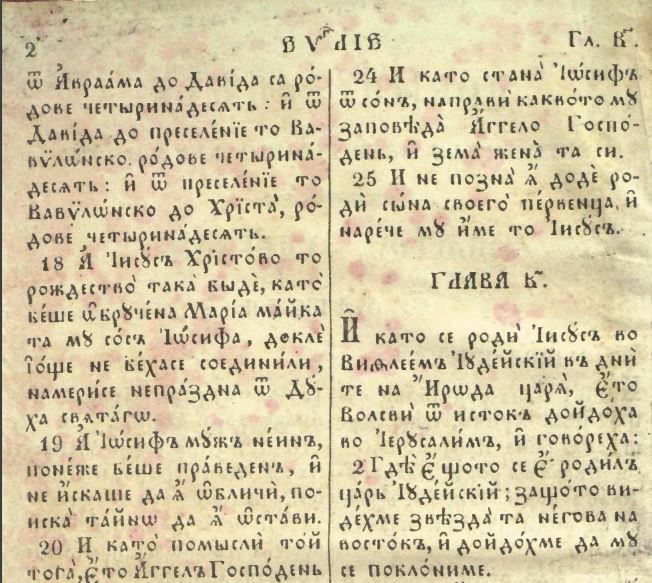
A page from the New Testament translated by Neofit Rilski in 1838, The Gospel of Matthew, chapter two.

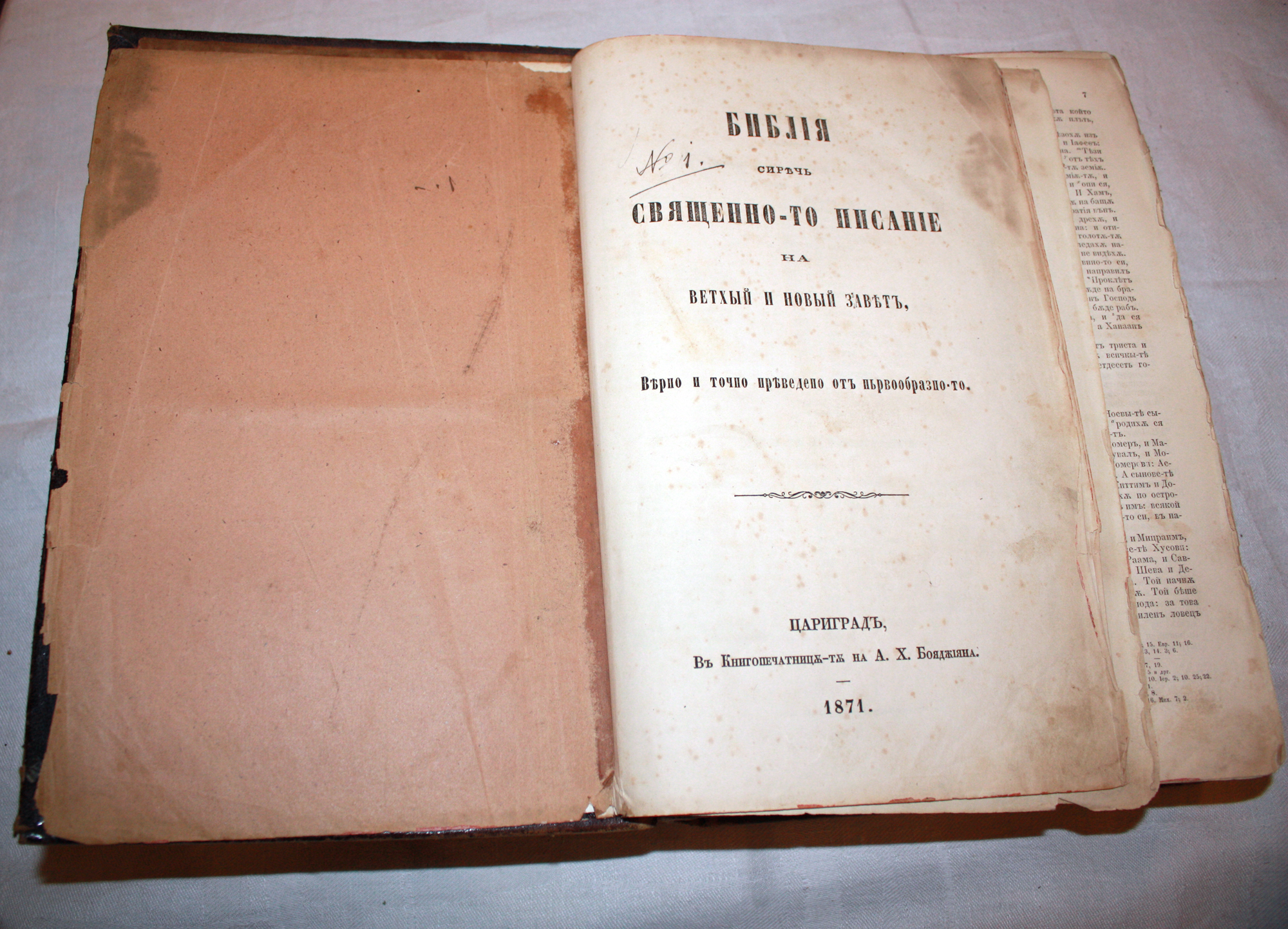
The first complete edition of the Bible in modern Bulgarian, printed in Istanbul 1871.

The royal Tetraevangelia of Ivan Alexander is an illuminated manuscript Gospel Book in middle Bulgarian, prepared and illustrated in 1355–1356 for Tsar Ivan Alexander of the Second Bulgarian Empire. The manuscript is regarded as one of the most important manuscripts of medieval Bulgarian culture. The manuscript, now in the British Library (Add. MS 39627), contains the text of the Four Gospels illustrated with 366 miniatures and consists of 286 parchment folios, 33 by 24.3 cm in size.

Bible translations into modern Bulgarian date from the 1820s and were largely organised by Protestant missionaries. The Bulgarian Orthodox Church initially preferring the continued use of Old Church Slavonic.

The Archimandrite Theodosius, abbot of the Bistritsa Monastery in Romania, translated the New Testament for the British and Foreign Bible Society, which was printed at St. Petersburg in 1823 . "It was begun by the Archimandrite Theodosius, with the sanction of Gregory, Patriarch of Constantinople. (St. Matthew's Gospel in Church Slavic and Bulgarian 1823 ) was published by the Russian Bible Society." This attempt to translate the Bible into Modern Bulgarian was characterized with poor grammatical style and was greatly influenced by the Church Slavonic version. The entire edition was sent to Saint Petersburg and is said to have been destroyed there. The BFBS had also contracted nationalist journalist Konstantin Fotinov who translated the New Testament but the BFBS did not approve it because "it was neither Slav[onic] or Bulgarian".

An independent attempt to publish a Bulgarian translation of the New Testament occurred in 1828, as Petar Sapunov and his brother Father Serafim published a translation of the four gospels at the Bucharest metropolitan press in Wallachia (Romania). This translation was completed in the Eastern Bulgarian dialect.

In 1835 the Bulgarian monk Neofit Rilski started a translation of the New Testament. The translation was completed on April 18, 1838. The translation was done in the dialect from the area of Gorna Dzhumaya (present day Blagoevgrad in the region of Macedonia).

Here is a small sample from this translation, Matthew 2:1-2 using the modern Bulgarian orthography:

1. И като се роди Исус во Витлеем Юдейский в дните на Ирода царa, ето волсви от исток дойдоха во Иерусалим и говореха:
2. Где е щото се е родил цар Юдейский; защото видехме звездата негова на восток и дойдохме да му се поклониме.

In 1840 5,000 copies of the first complete translation of the New Testament were printed in Smyrna by the British and Foreign Bible Society. A second edition which was printed in Smyrna in 1850 was an almost exact reprint of the 1840 edition. A third edition followed in 1853 with 15,000 copies. The fourth edition was published in 1857 in Bucharest, and for the first time civil characters type was used. In 1859, two more editions were published. In 1866, a new “pocket” edition with text revised by Elias Riggs and Dr. Albert Long was printed in Constantinople. The New Testament was revised and reprinted a total of nine times.

In the period from 1840 to 1860 the Eastern (Tarnovo) dialect was adopted as literary Bulgarian language and the Macedonian dialect, in which the New Testament had been translated, was widely rejected. By 1858 Neofit Rilski had finished large portion of the Old Testament. Riggs met with Neofit Rilski and discussed a possible revision of the Bulgarian New Testament to remove the Macedonian dialect elements. Neofit objected the revision, so Riggs took the translation and returned to Constantinople. In January 1859 Riggs invited the Bulgarian teacher Hristodul Kostovich to help him with the revision.

In 1862 Long and Riggs visited the noted Bulgarian writer and poet Petko Rachov Slaveykov in Tryavna. Slaveykov agreed to help with the translation and began the work on the revising of Neofit’s New Testament at once. Long joined the revision of the New Testament into the Eastern dialect in 1863 and later assisted with the translation of the Old Testament. In June 1871, after more than 12 years of revision and translation, 36,000 copies of the complete Bible translation in Bulgarian were published in Constantinople. The translation came to be known as the Tsarigrad (Constantinople) edition.

The decision to revise and publish the Bible in the Eastern dialect was the historical factor based on which the modern Bulgarian language departed from the Western/Macedonian dialect to adopt the Eastern/Thracian dialect.

With the fall of the Berlin Wall in 1989, several organizations attempted to provide a new translation of the Bible in Bulgarian. In 1993 a Protestant New Testament was printed. A complete new Orthodox translation was published in 1995, followed by three new Protestant revisions of the Bulgarian Bible in the period of 2000–2001 by publishing houses of Veren (Faithful), Nov Chovek (New Man) and the Bible League.

Jáni Vasilčin published in 1998 the New Testament in Banat Bulgarian language. The Banat Bulgarians are a Catholic minority group in western Romania and northeastern Serbia.

Jehovah's Witnesses have translated their New World Translation of the Holy Scriptures into Bulgarian.

== See also ==
- Bible translations into Macedonian
