= Bulgarian Eagle (newspaper) =

Bulgarian newspaper

Bulgarian Eagle (Bulgarian: Български орел) is the first Bulgarian information and education newspaper.

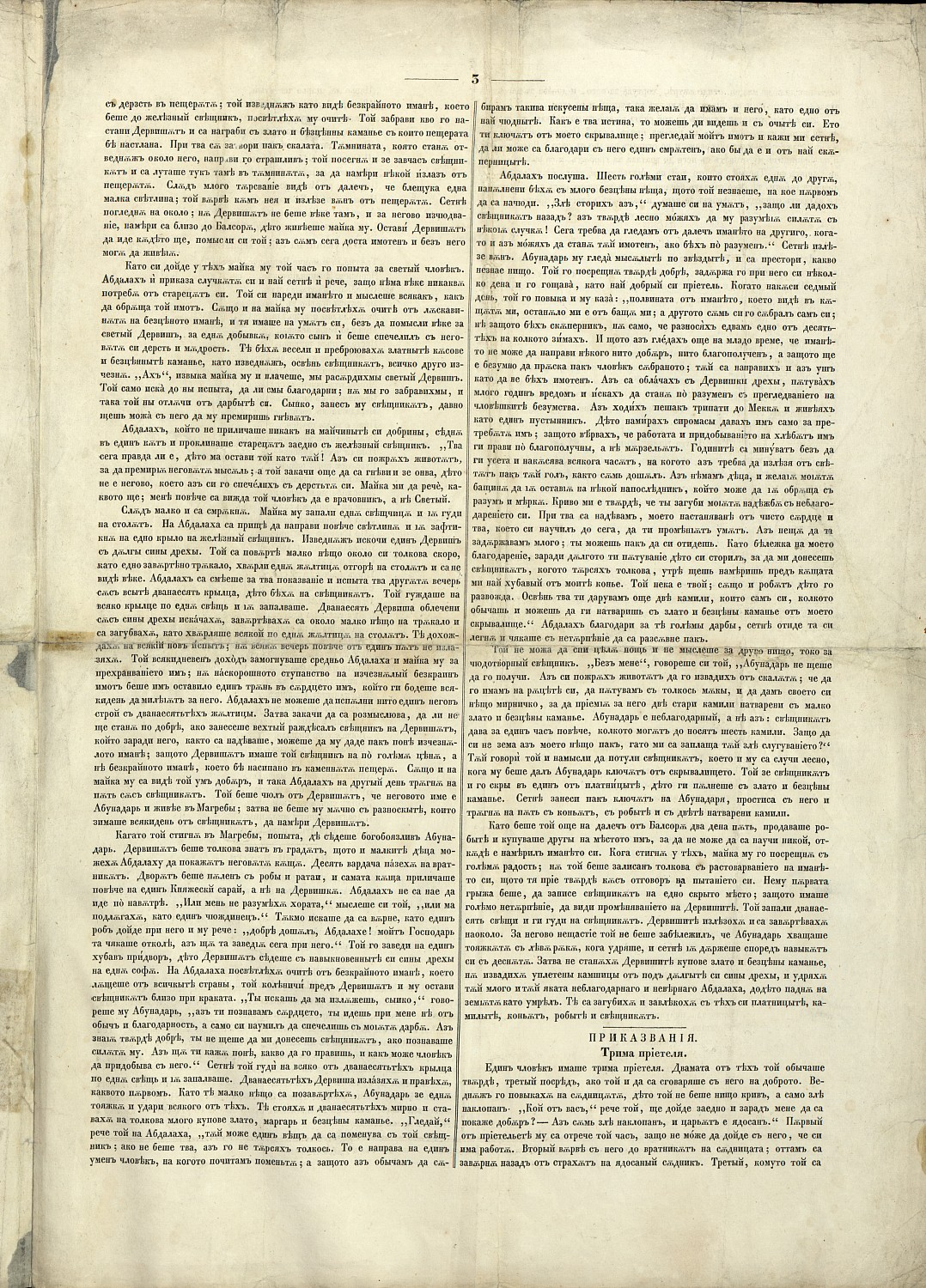

The newspaper was published by Ivan Bogorov. It was published in Leipzig on 3 copies on the following dates: 20 April and 20 September 1846 and 1 January 1847. Ivan Bogorov conceives the newspaper as a fortnightly, but only 3 copies with different titles and a circulation of 500 are published. The newspaper was also distributed in Romania. Under the editorship of Ivan Bogorov, 88 issues were published, while on 25 February 1850, he was forced to lay the newspaper and printing press for 1000 francs and go to Bucharest. The newspaper is 4 pages in small format. Vasil Aprilov writes about him in Fotinov's magazine: "We saw the first issue of his acquaintance these days... we were glad that you have another Bulgarian diary and we wish him good luck from his pure heart.

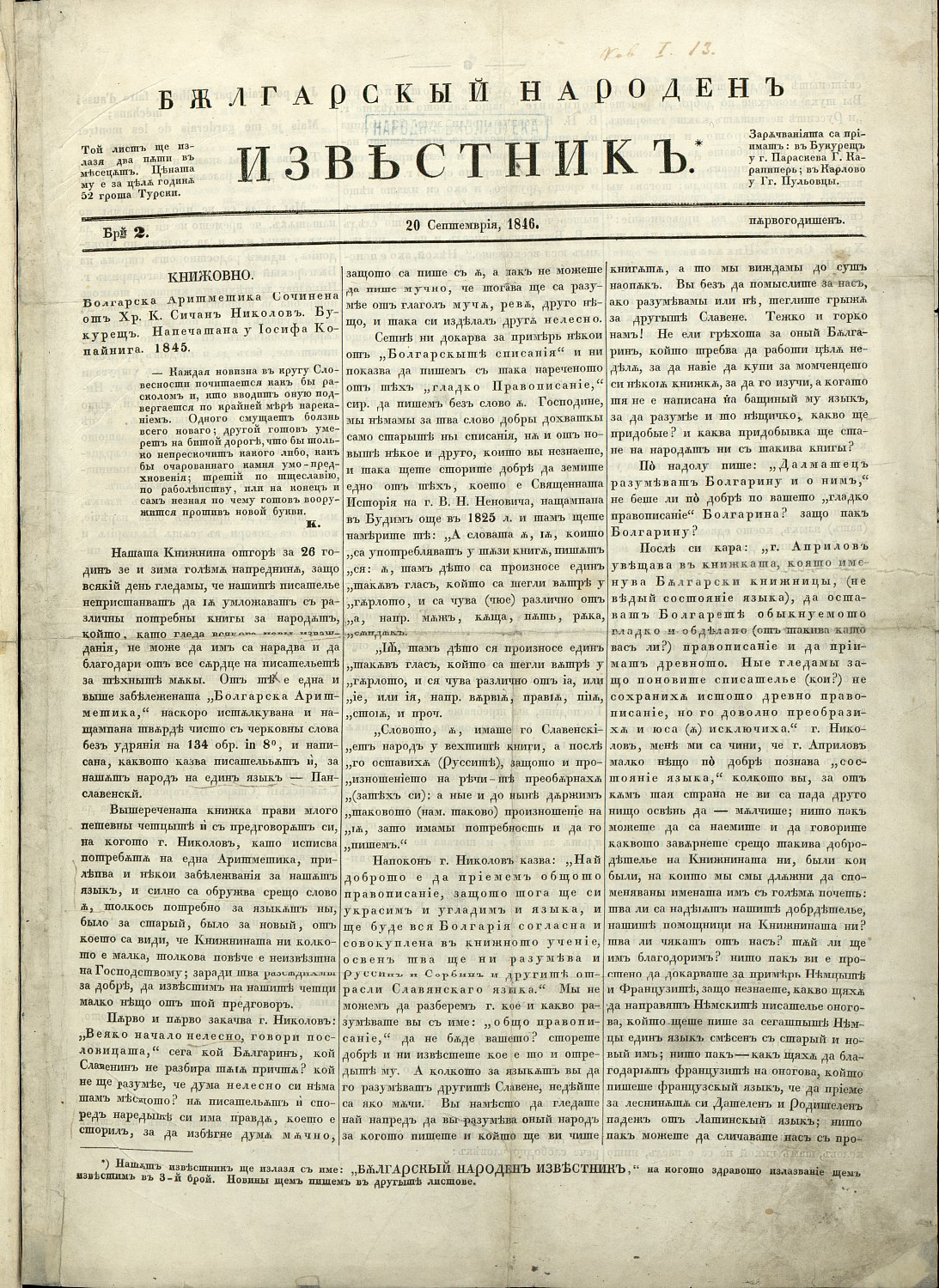

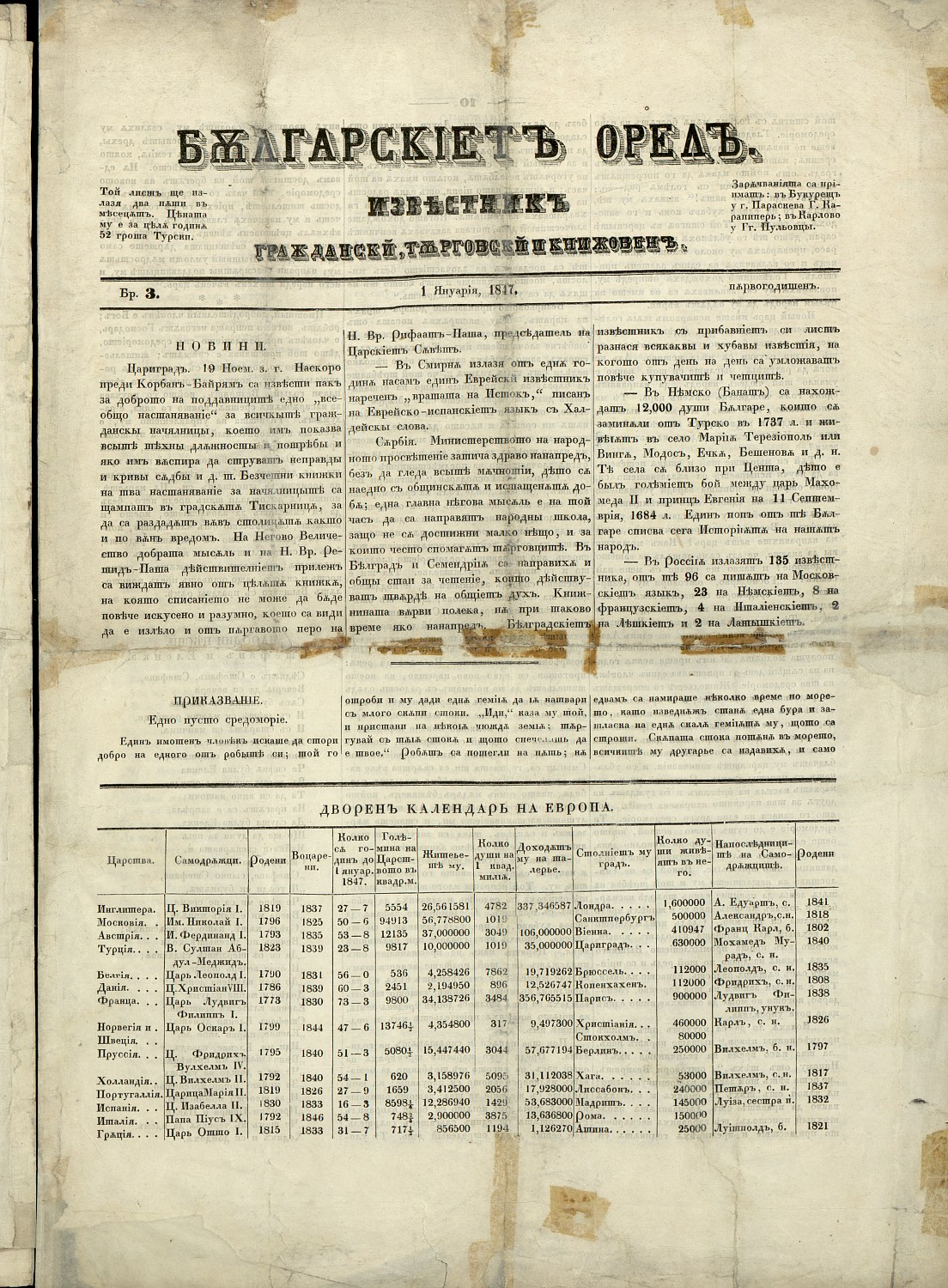

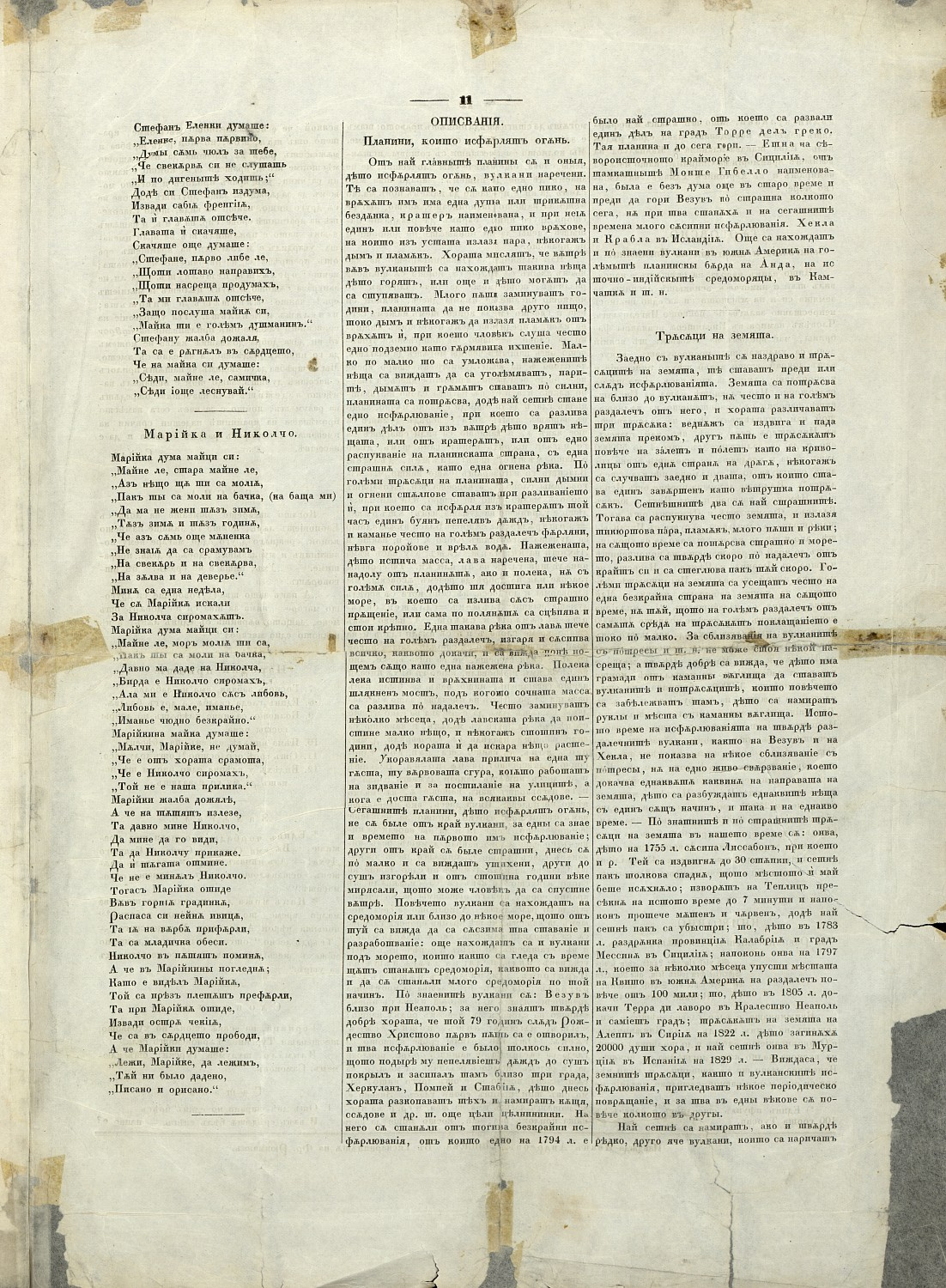
