= Bulgarian Orthodox church municipality, Giannitsa =

Association of the Bulgarian Exarchists

Enidje Vardar (Pazar) Bulgarian Municipality
- Enidje Vardar (Pazar) Bulgarian Municipality
- Ениджевардарска (Па̀зарската) българска община
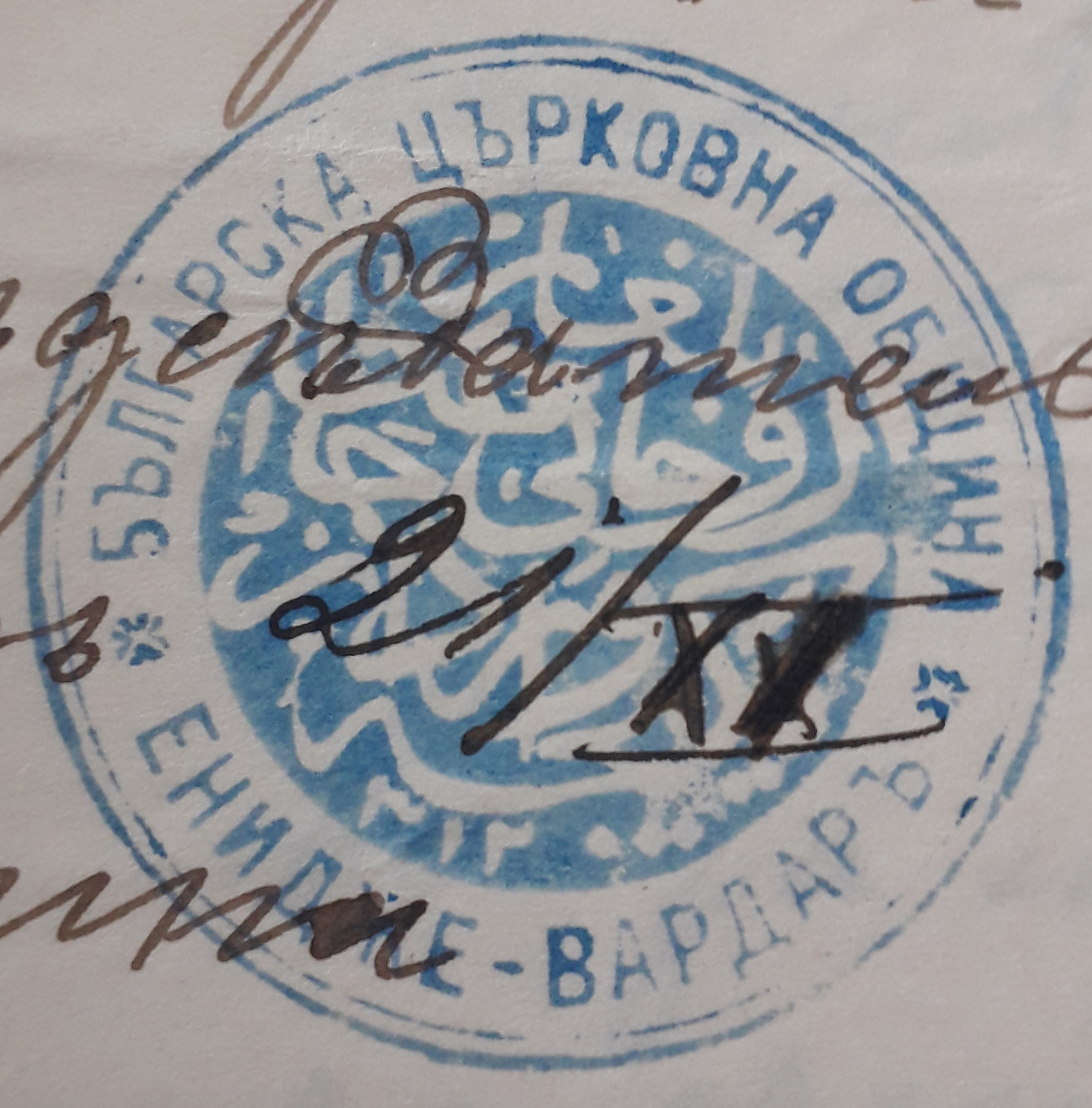

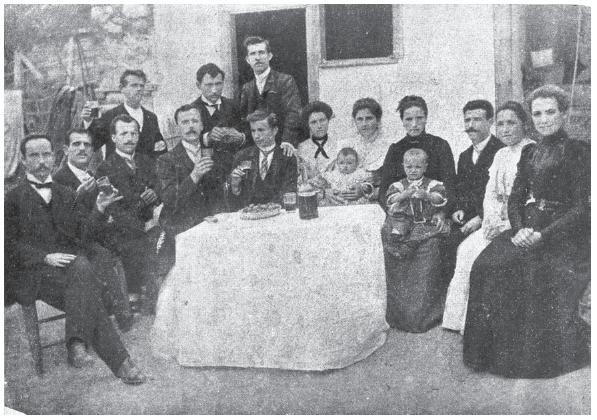
- Bulgarian teachers in Enidje Vardar, 1905
- Formation: january 1895
- Founded at: Giannitsa, Ottoman empire
- Dissolved: july 1913

The Enidje Vardar (Pazar) Bulgarian Municipality is a civil-ecclesiastical association of the Bulgarian Exarchists in Enidje Vardar (Pazar), today Giannitsa, Greece. Its duty was to maintain the Bulgarian schools, community center and churches, as well as the salaries of the teachers in the city.

== History ==
The Bulgarian Revival Movement in the city was led by priest Dimo, who, however, due to persecution by Metropolitan Nikodim, was forced to accept Uniateism and founded the Enidzhevardar Bulgarian Uniate Community. The Uniate movement in the city was initially on the rise, but soon died down and most Bulgarian families returned to Orthodoxy. A new blow to the Bulgarian movement was the imprisonment and subsequent death of the Bulgarian leader Hadji Tode, who was slandered before the authorities by Bishop Nikodim.

=== Struggle for opening of Bulgarian schools ===
Through the support of the local population from the Bulgarian Exarchate and the Bulgarian Municipality of Thessaloniki, a Bulgarian school was opened in 1890 with one male and one female teacher and 35 students. The following year, the school was closed under pressure, but it was reopened in the 1891/1892 school year. This year, there were 6 primary Bulgarian schools in the district, with nine teachers and 421 students. In Enidze Vardar, there was one primary and one grade school with a total of three teachers and 52 students. The grade school in the city became a two-grade school in 1894/1895, in 1900/1901 there were 6 teachers and 72 students, and in 1911/1912 the school became a three-grade school, and there was a library with over 360 books. In the district in 1899/1900 there were 15 primary schools, with 21 teachers and 794 students, and two grade schools with three teachers and 27 students. In 1902/1903 there were 15 primary schools, and two grade schools, with a total of 29 teachers and 877 students. In 1895/1895 the head teacher of the second-grade Bulgarian school in the city was Grigor Popdimitrov.

Letter from the temporary chairman of the municipality Grigor Aleksiev to Exarch Yosif, 1896

The schools opened are three in Enidze Vardar and one in Gumendze, in the villages of Alare, Postol, Asar Begovo, Babiani, Barovitsa, Valgatsi, Bozet, Vechti Pazar, Gerkartsi, Vadrishta, Grubevtsi, Damyan, Kadinovo, Konikovo, Kornishor, Kushinovo, Kriva, Krushari, Libyakhovo, Livaditsa, Litovoy, Mandilevo, Orizari, Petgus, Petrovo, Pilorik, Radomir, Ramna, Tumba, Tushilovo, Chichegus, Izvor, Boimitsa, Dabovo, Ramel and Gorgopik.

=== Opening of Bulgarian chapel and later of church ===
The first attempts to be open an Orthodox Bulgarian chapel in Yenice Vardar (Giannitsa) date back to 1891, when the school board of the Orthodox Bulgarians sent a letter to the Thessaloniki Bulgarian Municipality, explaining that a suitable house for conversion into a chapel had been found. The lack of a Bulgarian Orthodox church municipality thwarted this attempt. When it was established in January 1895, a Bulgarian chapel "Sts. Cyril and Methodius" was also opened after June of the same year with the voluntary donations of Archimandrite Nikolay, Dimitar Mihaylov, Trayan Kalinchanov, El. Ivanova, D. Galabov, T. Nedelkov, A. Atanasova, D. Popgeorgiev, Gligor Mokrev, Maria Dimitrova, El. Dimitrova, Katerina Bozhinova, grandmother Velika Mokreva, Bozhina Pozharlieva, Velika Gl. Mokreva, Maria Poptrayanova, Katerina Dimitrova and Maria Mitsova. The chapel began to operate until the end of the year, when the Nativity of Christ was celebrated there. On June 1, 1896, an application was submitted for the issuance of a foundation stone for the construction of a Bulgarian church next to the kaymakamam (Ottoman Turkish official). In April and May 1902, the chairman of the municipality, Archimandrite Dionysius, once again put the issue on the agenda with a letter to the Bulgarian Exarchate and to the Grand Vizier of the Sublime Porte.

In the first days of 1906, a sultan's decree was received for the construction of the Bulgarian church. It was allowed to be 18 m long, 12 m wide and 9 m high, with one bell tower instead of the originally planned two. The Bulgarian municipal authorities issued a protocol for the immediate start of the construction of the church. A specially created committee included Nikola Shkutov, Dine Garkov, Andon Popstavrev, Harish Bozhkov, Dionis Stankov, Hadzhi Dionish and Hristo Mandalchev, who managed to collect the initial 78 gold pounds and 25 groschen. The property on which the church was to be built was owned by Dimitar Trapkov, Valkoyanov and Georgi Kostov, who donated 752 arshins of land, and two more beds of 800 arshins were purchased for a total area of 1772 arshins. At a solemn event attended by over 500 people, the foundation stone was laid on March 12, 1906. The construction was the work of master Serafim Dichev, who determined the total cost of the construction at 81,900 gold groschen, with 10,389 groschen having been collected to date. Exarch Joseph sent a letter to the Bulgarian authorities, who allocated 300 Turkish liras from the Council of Ministers of the Principality of Bulgaria through the Bulgarian National Bank.

== Chairmen of the municipality ==
Portrait	Name	Years of serv
	archimandrite Nikolay	1895–1896
	priest Grigor Aleksiev	1896–1897
	archimandrite Dionysius	(from 1897 De facto) 1898–1903
	priest Nikola Shkutov	1903–1908
	priest Toma Nikolov	1908–1909
	priest Trayko Kalaydzhiev	1909–1910 (vicar)
	priest Grigorius Lazarov	1910–1911 (vicar)
	priest Georgi Shumanov	1911–1913 (vicar)

== Main teachers of the Bulgarian Orthodox church municipality ==
Portrait	Name	Years of service
	Dimitar Mihaylov	1893–1895
	Ahil Mindzhov	early 1895
	Grigorius Popdimitrov	late 1895–1896
	Panteley Kondov	1896–1897
	Andrey Stoyanov	1897–1898
	Nikola Harlev	1898–1900
	Nikola Pashov	1900–1901
	Kostadin Kuzmanov	early 1901
	Ahil Mindzhov	1901–1902
	Kostadin Kuzmanov	1902–1903
	Apostol Tomov	1904–1905
	Dimitar Karabashev	early 1905
	Anton Toshev	1905
	Ivan Pampulov	1905–1907
	Porfirii Shaynov	1908–1910
	Mihail Anchev	1911–1912
