= Bulgarian Revival =

Period of Bulgarian history (1762–1878)

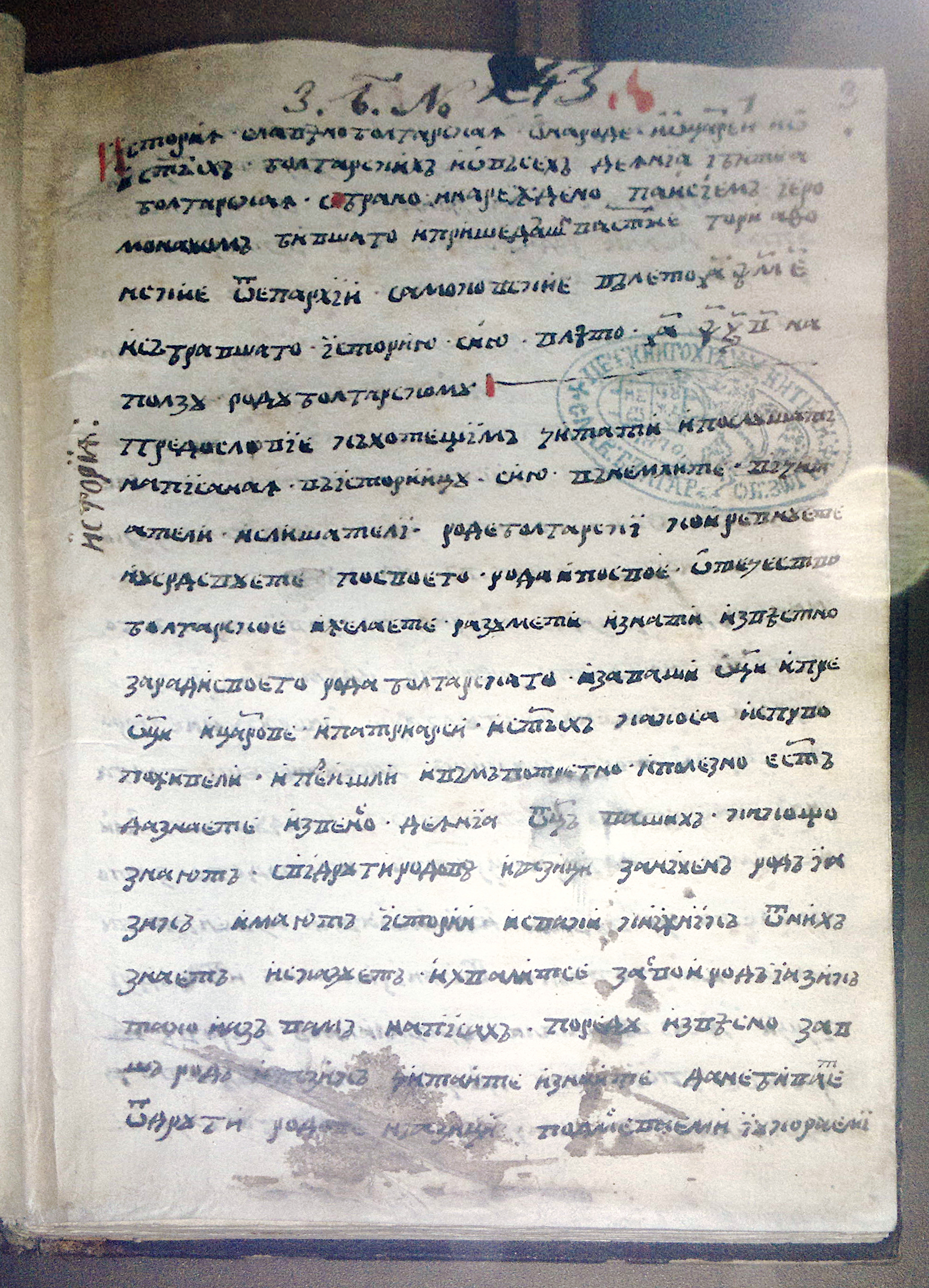
St Paisius of Hilendar put the beginning of the Bulgarian Revival with his Istoriya Slavyanobolgarskaya.

The Bulgarian Revival (Bulgarian: Българско възраждане, romanized: Balgarsko vazrazhdane, Turkish: Bulgar ulus canlanması), also called the Bulgarian National Revival, was a period of socio-economic development and national integration among Bulgarian people under Ottoman rule. It is commonly accepted to have started with the historical book, Istoriya Slavyanobolgarskaya, written in 1762 by Paisius, a Bulgarian monk of the Hilandar monastery at Mount Athos, leading to the national awakening of Bulgaria and the modern Bulgarian nationalism, and lasting until the creation of autonomous status for Bulgaria with the formation of the Principality of Bulgaria in 1878 as a result of the Russo-Turkish War of 1877–1878.

== Characteristics ==
The period is remarkable for its characteristic architecture which can still be observed in old Bulgarian towns such as Tryavna, Koprivshtitsa and Veliko Tarnovo, the rich literary heritage of authors like Ivan Vazov and Hristo Botev that inspired the Bulgarian struggle for independence and an autonomous church, and the April Uprising of 1876, a significant event of armed opposition to Ottoman rule, which ultimately led to the Russo-Turkish Liberation War of 1877–1878. The significant changes in the Bulgarian society, the freedom of economic initiative and religious choice led to the formation of the Bulgarian nation in its ethnic borders and common territory embracing the lands of Moesia (including Dobruja), Thrace and Macedonia.

The Bulgarian National Revival is traditionally divided into three periods, the first from the 18th until the beginning of the 19th century (Bulgarian National Awakening), the second from the Ottoman reforms of the 1820s to the 1850s until the Crimean War, and the third from the Crimean War until the Liberation of Bulgaria in 1878.

The beginning of the Bulgarian National Revival has been a topic of intensified discussion in the past. According to contemporaries of the period, it began in the 1820s. Later Marin Drinov suggested the actual beginning was marked by the writing of Istoriya Slavyanobolgarskaya by Paisius of Hilendar. According to an even later assumption by Hristo Gandev, the period began in the beginning of the 17th century after the end of the Köprülü era and the beginning of the Tulip period and the rule of the Phanariots. The prevailing opinion in contemporary historiography is that the Bulgarian National Revival's beginning is marked by the first clear processes of decomposition in the Ottoman Empire. The April Uprising led to the liberation and the end of the Revival.

The Bulgarian National Revival ended with the Liberation of Bulgaria. This is meant only to include the Principality of Bulgaria, as revival processes continued until later in Eastern Rumelia and Macedonia.

== Notable figures ==
=== Bulgarian Enlighteners and Revolutionaries ===
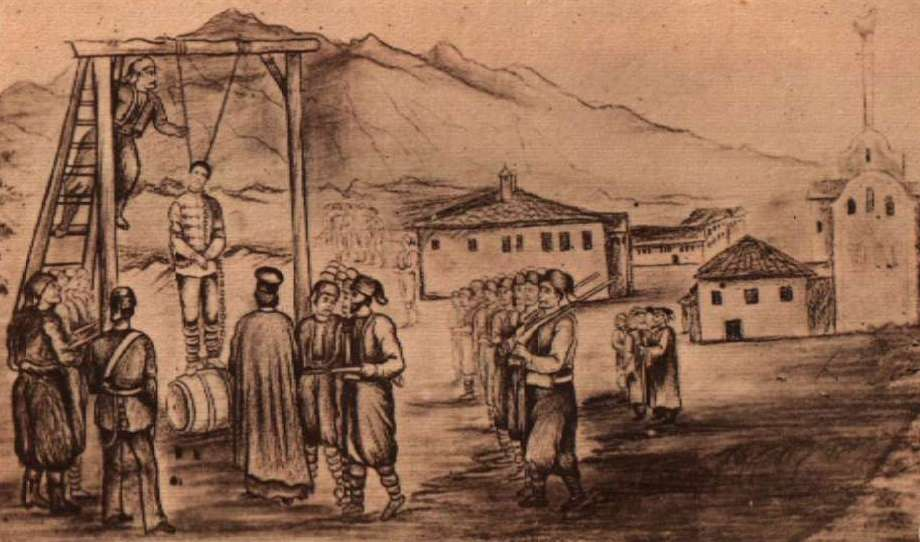
Execution of Vasil Levski in 1873

- Yankul Hrelyovski (first half of the 18th century)
- Yosif Bradati (1714-1789)
- Paisius of Hilendar (1722 - 1773)
- Sophronius of Vratsa (1739 - 1813)
- Spiridon Gabrovski (1740 - 1824)
- Stoyan Kovanlashki
- Puncho Kuzdin
- Yosif Hilendarets
- Todor Vrachanski
- Aleksi Velkovich Popovich
- Doyno Gramatik
- Dimitraki Hadjitoshev
- Nikifor of Rila
- Yoakim Karchovski (1750 - 1820)
- Indzhe Voyvoda (1755 - 1821)
- Kiril Peychinovich (1770 - 1865)
- Todor of Pirdop (1775 - 1850)
- Nikola Karastoyanov (1778 - 1874)
- Rayno Popovich (1783 - 1858)
- Neofit Bozveli (c. 1785 - 1848)
- Joseph Sokolsky (1786 - 1879)
- Vasil Aprilov (1789 – 1847)
- Konstantin Fotinov (1790 - 1858)
- Neofit Rilski (1793 - 1881)
- Traycho Doychinovich
- Petar Beron (1799 – 1871)
- Kolyu Ficheto (1800 - 1881)
- Hristaki Pavlovich (1804 – 1848)
- Ilyo Voyvoda (1805 – 1898)
- Zahari Krusha (1808 - 1881)
- Dimitar Smrikarov (1810 - 1876)
- Zahari Zograf (1810–1853)
- Miladinovi Brothers - Dimitar Miladinov (1810–1862) and Konstantin Miladinov (1830–1862
- Alexander Exarch (1810 - 1891)
- Ilarion Makariopolski (1812 - 1875)
- Anthim I (1816 - 1888)
- Parteniy Zografski (died 1876)
- Nikola Obrazopisov (1828 - 1915)
- Ivan Bogorov (1818–1892)
- Georgi Rakovski (1821 – 1867)
- Stanislav Dospevski (1823 - 1878)
- Nayden Gerov (1823 – 1900)
- Nedelya Petkova (Baba Nedelya, Grandma Nedelya) (1826 - 1894)
- Roumena Voyvoda (1829 - 1862 or 1895)
- Filip Totyu (1830 - 1907)
- Panayot Hitov (1830 – 1918)
- Dobri Voynikov (1833 - 1878)
- Lyuben Karavelov (1834 – 1879)
- Dragan Manchov (1834 - 1908)
- Kuzman Shapkarev (1834 - 1909)
- Dimitar Obshti (1835 - 1873)
- Todor Ikonomov (1835 – 1892)
- Bacho Kiro (1835 – 28 May 1876)
- Vasil Levski (1837 – 1873)
- Marin Drinov (1838 - 1906)
- Stefan Karadzha (1840 – 1868)
- Hadzhi Dimitar (1840 – 1868)
- Vasil Drumev (1841 – 1901)
- Nikola Voyvodov (1841 - 1847)
- Georgi Benkovski (1843 – 1876)
- Petko Voyvoda (1844 – 1900)
- Vasil Petleshkov (1845 - 1876)
- Tanyo Stoyanov (1846 - 1876)
- Hristo Botev (1848 - 1876)
- Ivan Vazov (1850 – 1921)
- Panayot Volov (1850 – 1876)
- Georgi Izmirliev (1851 – 1876)
- Todor Kableshkov (1851 – 1876)
- Stefan Stambolov (1854 - 1895)
- Konstantin Velichkov (1855 - 1907)
- Trayko Kitanchev (1858 – 1895)
- Anastasia Uzunova (1862–1948)

=== Predecessors and other notable figures ===
- Euthymius of Tarnovo (c. 1325 - c. 1402/1404)
- Romylos of Vidin (1330 - 1385)
- Cyprian, Metropolitan of Kiev (1336 - 1406)
- Gregory Tsamblak (c. 1365 - 1420)
- Joasaf of Vidin (14th century)
- Constantine of Kostenets (ca. 1380 - after 1431)
- Vladislav the Grammarian (1456-1479)
- Pimen Zografski (1540 - 1620)
- Petar Bogdan (1601 – 1674)
- Filip Stanislavov (1608 - 1674)
- Petar Parchevich (1612 – 1674)
- Avram Dimitriev (1630 - 1710)
- Velko Popovich (before 1689 - after 1706)
- Hristofor Žefarović (1690 - 1753)
- Parteniy Pavlovich (1695 - 1760)
- Blasius Kleiner (? - 1785)
- Elias Riggs (1810 – 1901)
- Spiridon Palauzov (1818 - 1892)
- Evlogi (1819 - 1897) and Hristo (1824 - 1872) Georgievi brothers
- Felix Kanitz (1829 – 1904)
- Albert Long (1832 - 1901)
- Konstantin Josef Jireček (1854 - 1918)
- Karel (1859 - 1944) and Hermann Škorpil (1858 - 1923)
- Dimitar Kudoglu (1862 - 1940)
- Todor Aleksandrov (1881 – 1924)

== See also ==
- Ottoman Bulgaria
- Bulgarian Exarchate
- Bulgarian Millet
- Constantinople Conference
- Treaty of San Stefano
- Congress of Berlin
- Kresna–Razlog uprising
- Bulgarian unification
- Ilinden-Preobrazhenie Uprising
- Bulgarian Declaration of Independence
- Greater Bulgaria

== Gallery ==
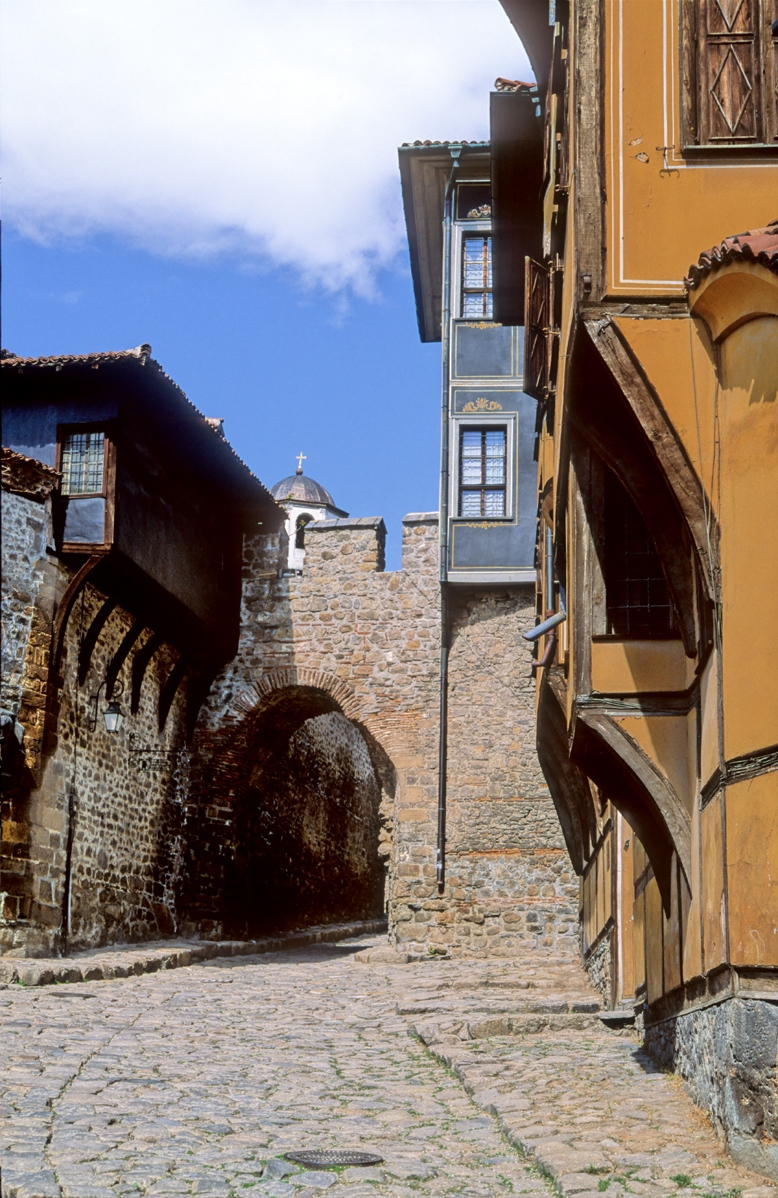
The characteristic architecture of Plovdiv's old town

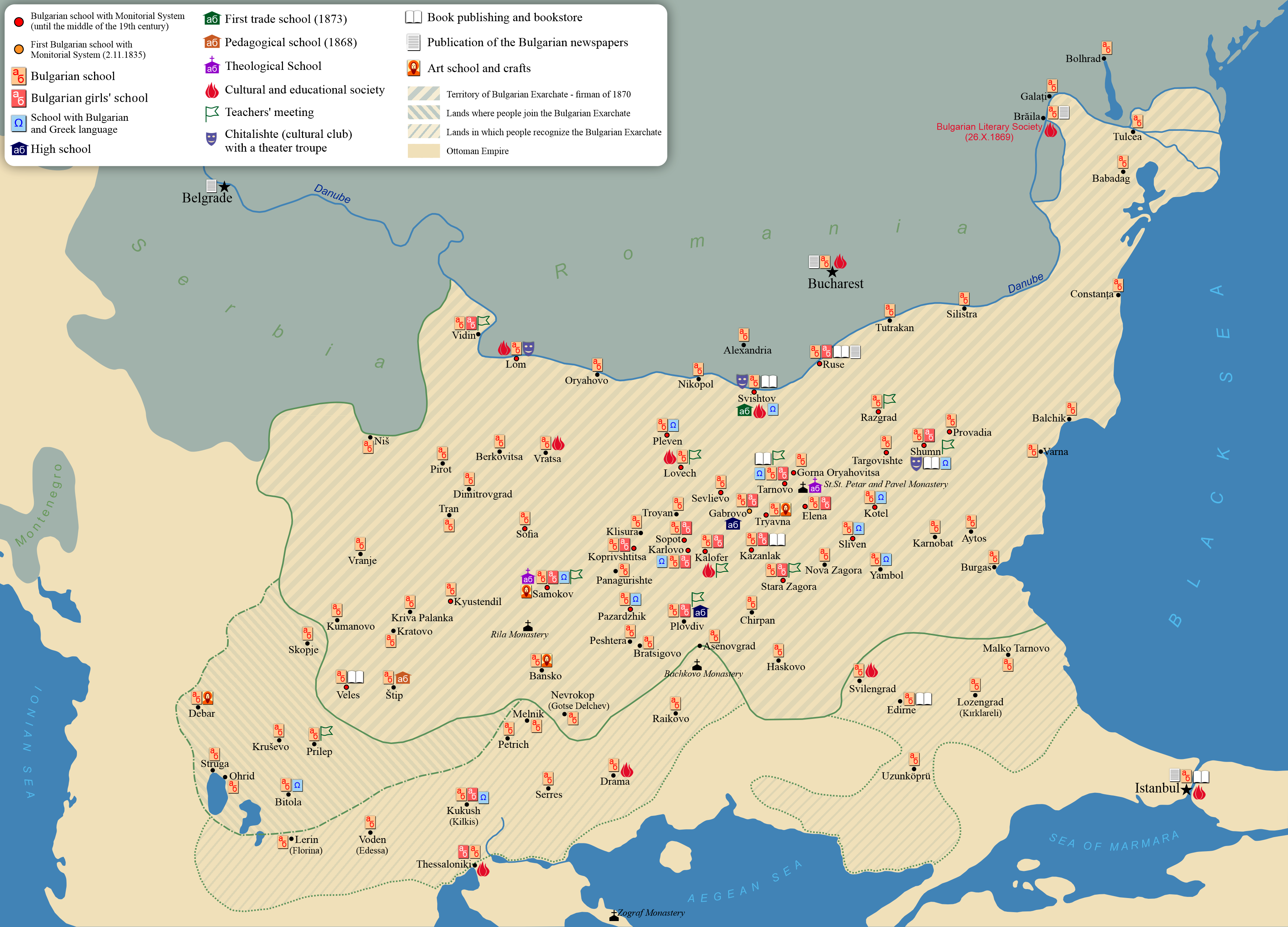
Bulgarian National Revival (18th-19th centuries)

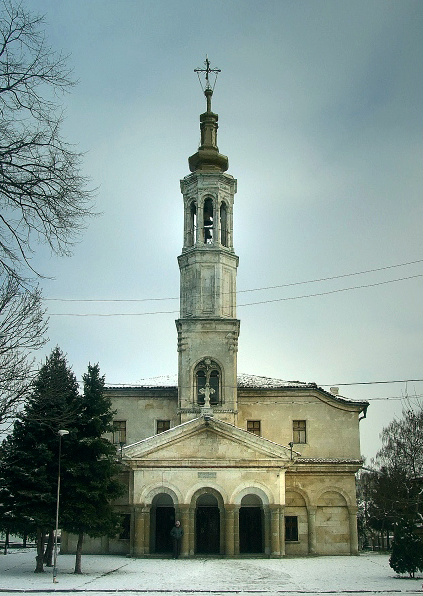
Bulgarian National Revival Church Architecture, Targovishte
