= Hristo Gandev =

Bulgarian historian

Hristo Gandev (Христо Гандев; December 25, 1907, Veliko Tarnovo - July 27, 1987, Sofia) was a Bulgarian professor and historian.
