= Neofit Rilski =

Bulgarian monk, teacher and artist (1793–1881)

Neofit Rilski Неофит Рилски
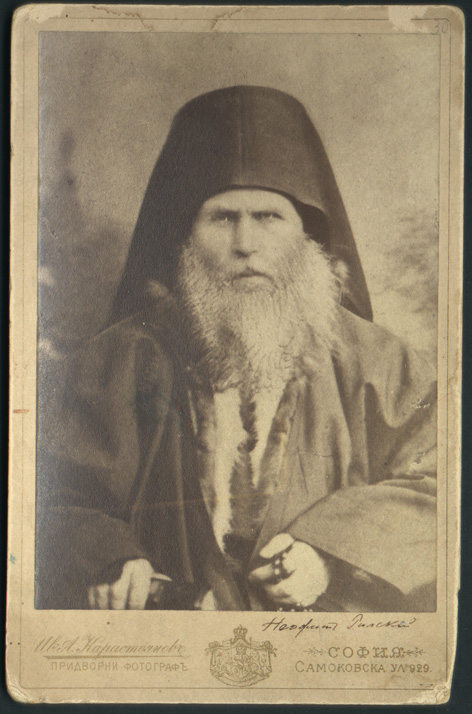
- Born: Nikola Poppetrov Benin; Никола Поппетров Бенин; 1793; Bansko, Rumelia Eyalet, Ottoman Empire (now Bulgaria)
- Died: 4 January 1881 (aged 87–88); Rila Monastery, Principality of Bulgaria
- Occupations: monk, artist, translator
- Known for: Translating the first Bible into vernacular Bulgarian

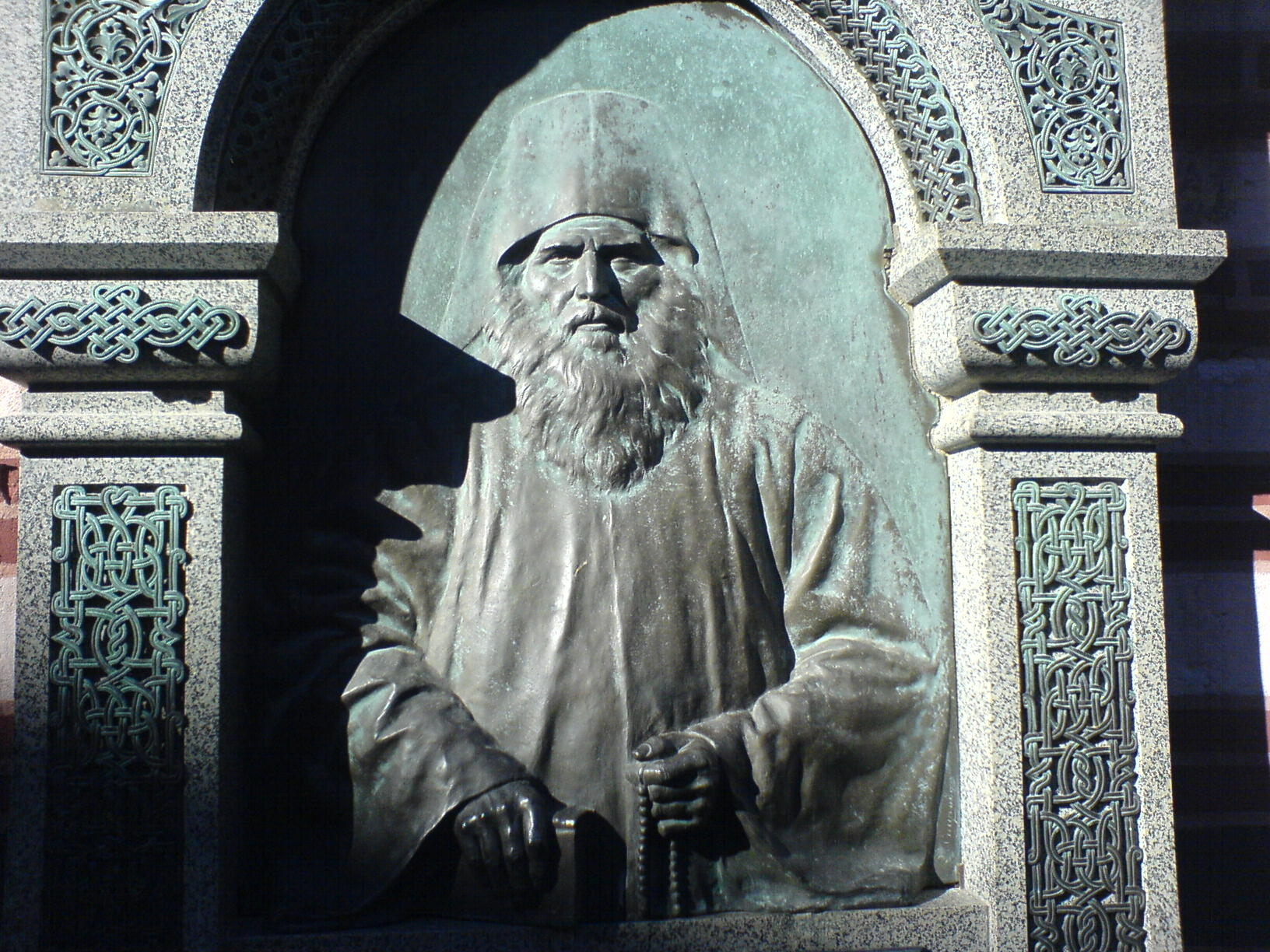
Neofit Rilski gravestone in the Rila monastery, Bulgaria

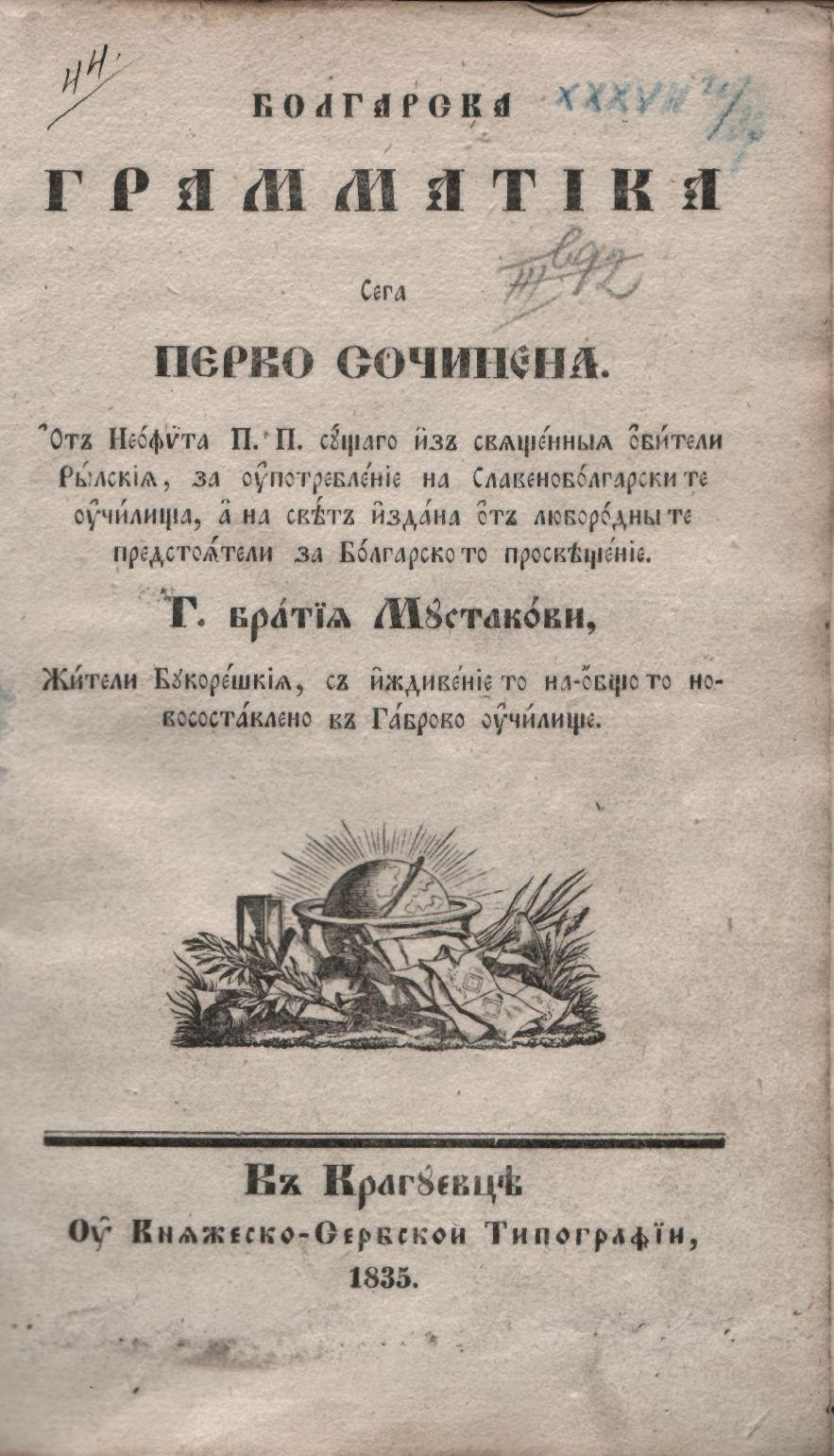
Front cover of the first grammar book of the modern Bulgarian language by Rilski.

Neofit Rilski (Bulgarian: Неофит Рилски) or Neophyte of Rila (born Nikola Poppetrov Benin; (Note: Bulgarian: Никола Поппетров Бенин) 1793 – 4 January 1881) was a 19th-century Bulgarian monk, teacher and artist, and an important figure of the Bulgarian National Revival.

== Biography ==
He was born in the southwestern town of Bansko (or possibly in the village of Guliyna Banya) of Pirin Macedonia. Benin was educated to become a teacher, initially by his father Petar, and later at the Rila Monastery, where he studied iconography and had access to Greek and Church Slavonic books. He went to Melnik in 1822, where he spent four years as a student of the noted teacher Adam and perfected his Greek and Greek literature knowledge. Initially working as a teacher in the Rila Monastery, he also spent time working in Samokov (1827–1831), then back in the monastery, then went to Gabrovo and Koprivshtitsa (1835–1839) and returned to the monastery as a teacher to join the theological school on the island of Halki, where he spent four and a half years. He returned to the Rila Monastery in 1852. He spent the remaining part of his life in Rila, and since 1860 was the monastery's hegumen. He stayed in the monastery despite being offered higher positions in the Orthodox hierarchy, such as becoming a bishop or the rector of the projected Tarnovo seminary.

In 1835, Rilski issued his Bolgarska gramatika, the first grammar book of modern Bulgarian language. His other books include Tablitsi vzaimouchitelni and the 1852 Greek-Slavic dictionary Slovar greko-slavyanskiy. Neofit Rilski made the first popular translation of the New Testament in modern Bulgarian language (not a mixture between Church Slavonic and vernacular elements), commissioned, edited and distributed by the American missionary Elias Riggs. Rilski considered Old Church Slavonic as synonymous with Old Bulgarian and he tried to unify Western and Eastern Bulgarian dialects.

Neofit Rilski died in the Rila Monastery on 4 January 1881.

Neofit Peak on Smith Island, South Shetland Islands and South-West University "Neofit Rilski" in Blagoevgrad are named after Neofit Rilski.

== Literature ==
Olesch, R. (ed.): Neofit Rilski, Bolgarska grammatika. Kragujevac 1835. Tablici Bukarest 1848. Unveränderter Nachdruck mit einer Einleitung herausgegeben von Reinhold Olesch (Slavistische Forschungen, Bd. 41). Köln-Wien: Böhlau 1989. (sample pages)
