= Elias Riggs =

American missionary

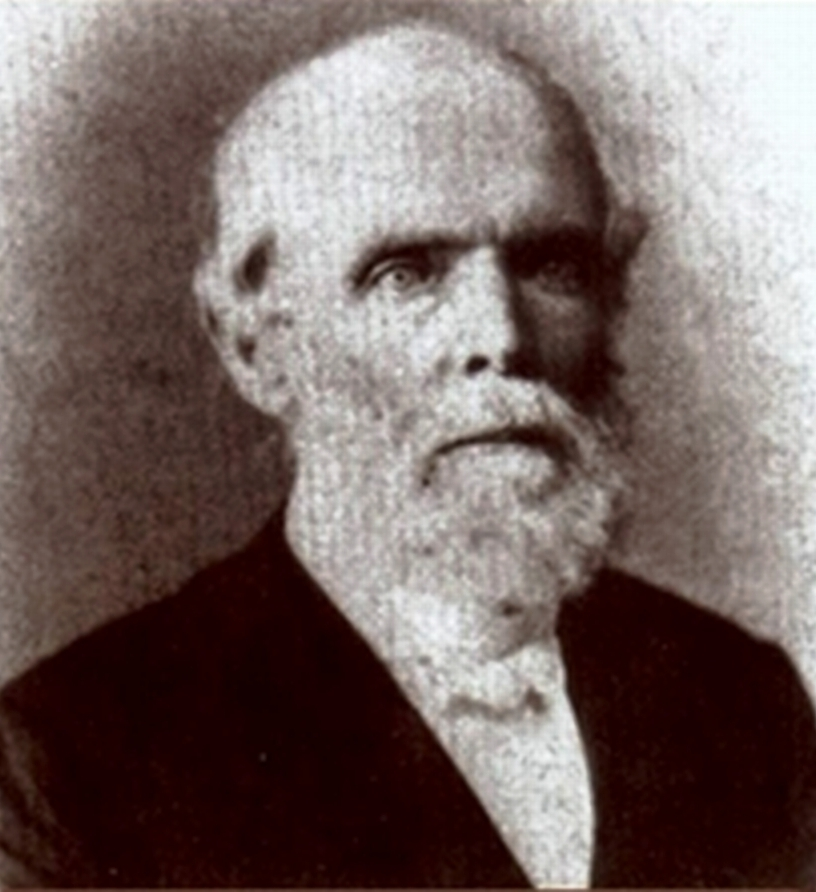
- Born: 19 November 1810; New Providence, New Jersey, U.S.
- Died: 17 January 1901 (aged 90); Constantinople, Ottoman Empire (modern-day Istanbul, Turkey)
- Resting place: Feriköy Protestant Cemetery, Istanbul, Turkey
- Education: Hanover College; Amherst College; Andover Theological Seminary
- Occupations: missionary, linguist
- Employer: American Board of Commissioners for Foreign Missions
- Known for: the Translation of the Scriptures into Armenian and Bulgarian
- Spouse: Martha Jane Dalzel (m. 1832; died 1887)
- Children: eight

Elias Riggs (November 19, 1810 – January 17, 1901) was an American Presbyterian missionary and linguist.

== Biography ==
Elias Riggs was born on November 19, 1810, in New Providence, New Jersey. He was the second son of Elias and Margaret (Congar) Hudson Riggs. His father was the pastor of the local Presbyterian church.

During his missionary activities in the Ottoman Empire he contributed greatly to the Bulgarian National Revival. He organized with Albert Long the first translation (by Neofit Rilski), and worked on editing, printing and dissemination of a translation of the Bible into modern Bulgarian. In 1844 he published the first Grammar of the modern Bulgarian language. Riggs did research on Chaldee Language, and also guided the translation of the Bible into modern Armenian language.

The government and church of newly independent Greece originally opposed Riggs' mission, but later had to accept American and British Protestant activities among Christians other than Greeks. Riggs took part in negotiations identifying the then actual ethnic delimitation between Greeks and Bulgarians in the Ottoman Empire, resulting in an approximate line drawn between Serres and Edessa in Macedonia north of which the Christian population was recognized as predominantly Bulgarian. Subsequently, the 1876 Constantinople Conference of the Great Powers confirmed that early delimitation in its more comprehensive definition of ethnic Bulgarian lands as of the late 19th century.

== Publications ==
- Suggested Emendations of the Authorized English Version of the Old Testament (1873)
- Suggested Modifications of the Revised Version of the New Testament
- Some Reasons in Favor of Retouching the Revised English Version of the Scriptures
- Notes on difficult passages of the New Testament
- A Manual of the Chaldee Language

== Honour ==
Riggs Peak on Smith Island, South Shetland Islands is named after Elias Riggs.

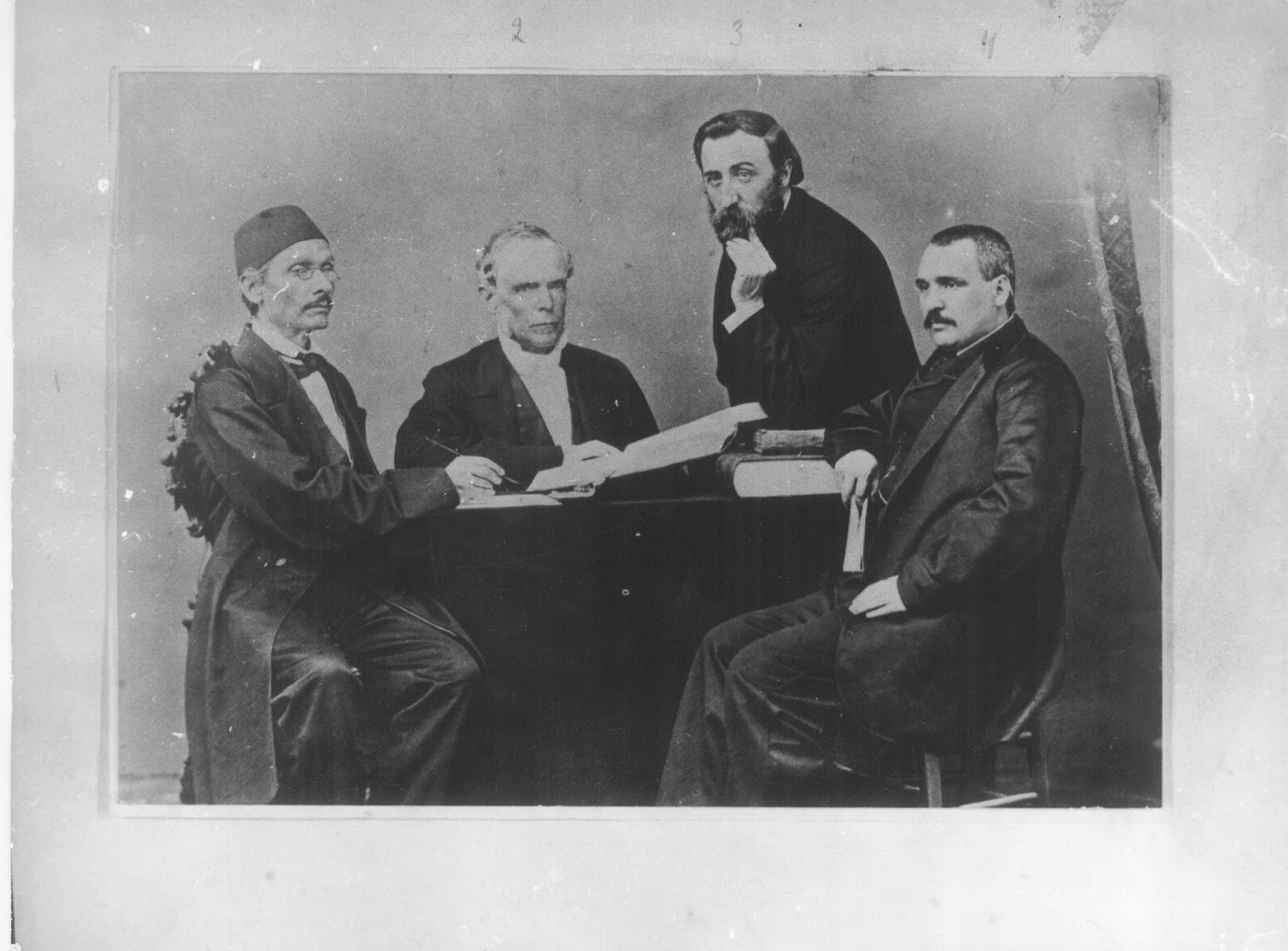
Christodul Costovich, Elias Riggs, Albert Long and Petko Slaveikov in Constantinople, circa 1864-1865
