= Konstantin Fotinov =

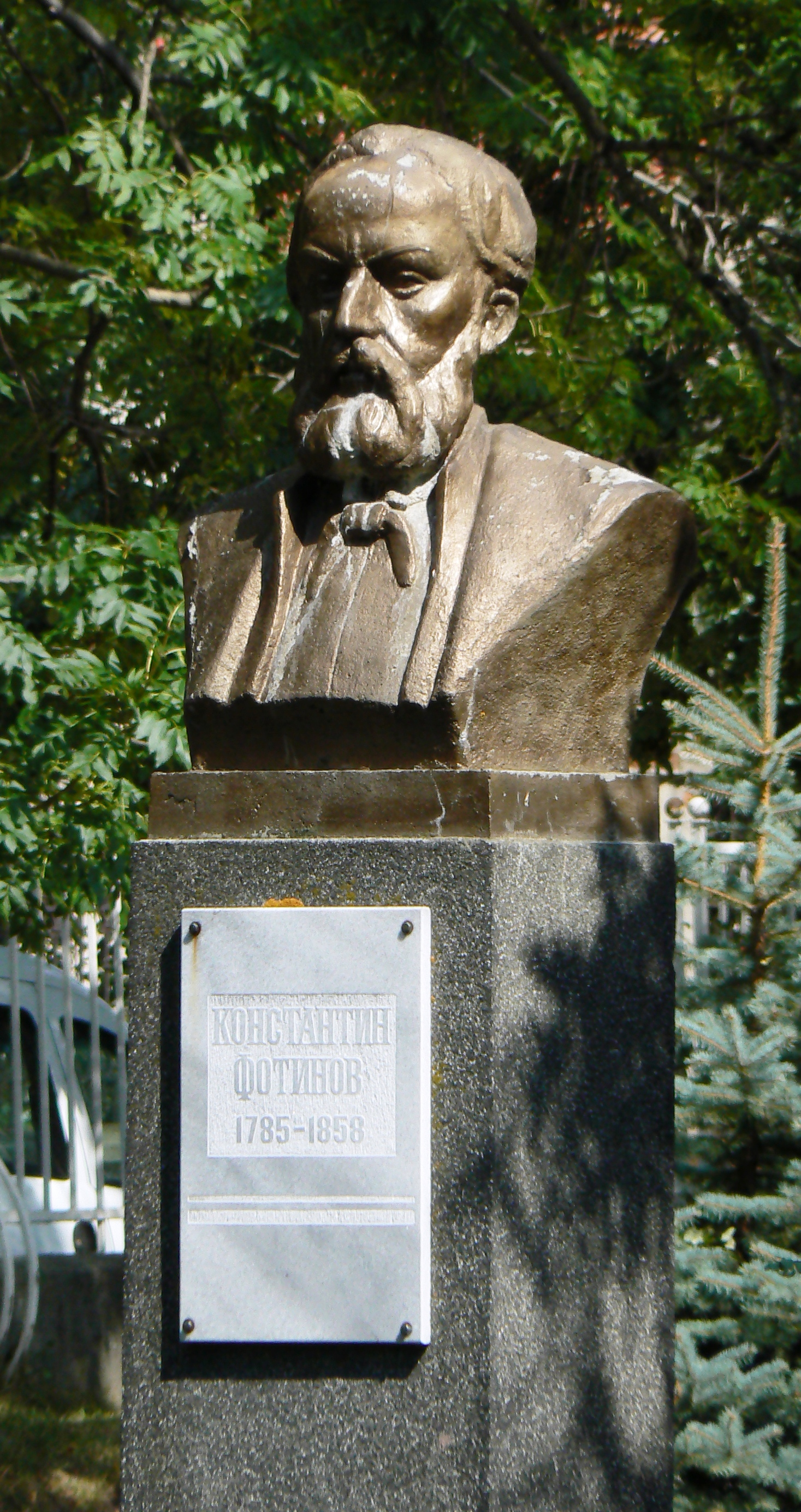

Konstantin Georgiev Fotinov (Bulgarian: Константин Георгиев Фотинов; c. 1790 – 29 November 1858) was a Bulgarian writer, translator and enlightenment figure of the Bulgarian National Revival period. The publisher of the first Bulgarian-language magazine, he is regarded as the founder of the Bulgarian press.

Fotinov was born in the town of Samokov around 1790 to the family of a small-time merchant from Plovdiv. He studied at a local monastical school before continuing his education in Plovdiv in Thrace and in Kydonies in Anatolia; he was tutored by the Greek humanist Theophilos Kairis. He worked on a translation of the Bible into Bulgarian for the BFBS, but they did not approve it. From 1828 on, Fotinov worked as a teacher and man of letters. He founded a private mixed Hellenic-Bulgarian school in İzmir (Smyrna) and employed the Bell-Lancaster method. The school's programme included Bulgarian, Greek and French classes. It had around 200 pupils from all around the Bulgarian lands.

Fotinov was the editor and publisher of the first Bulgarian magazine, Lyuboslovie ("philology", "love of words"), which he issued in Smyrna from 1844 to 1846. The magazine was richly illustrated and included articles on history, geography, religion, morale, medicine, hygiene, ansd language. Fotinov also published a Greek grammar book (1838) and a Bulgarian phrasebook (1845) and translated a geographic book from Greek to Bulgarian (1843). It was Fotinov that first addressed the issue of female education in the Bulgarian press.

From 1852 on, Fotinov worked on a Bulgarian translation of the Bible. He managed to translate the Old Testament: the Book of Psalms was published in Smyrna in 1855 and the Book of Genesis was issued in Istanbul (Tsarigrad) in 1857.
