= Bulgarian Folk Songs =

1861 collection of folk songs

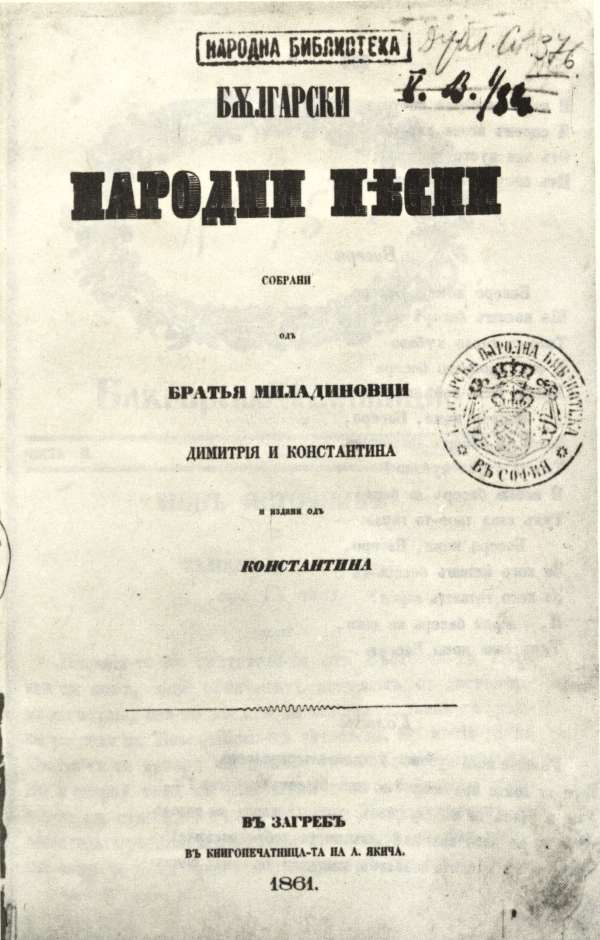
Bulgarian Folk Songs, collected by the Miladinov brothers Dimitar and Konstantin and published by Konstantin in Zagreb at the printing house of A. Jakic, 1861

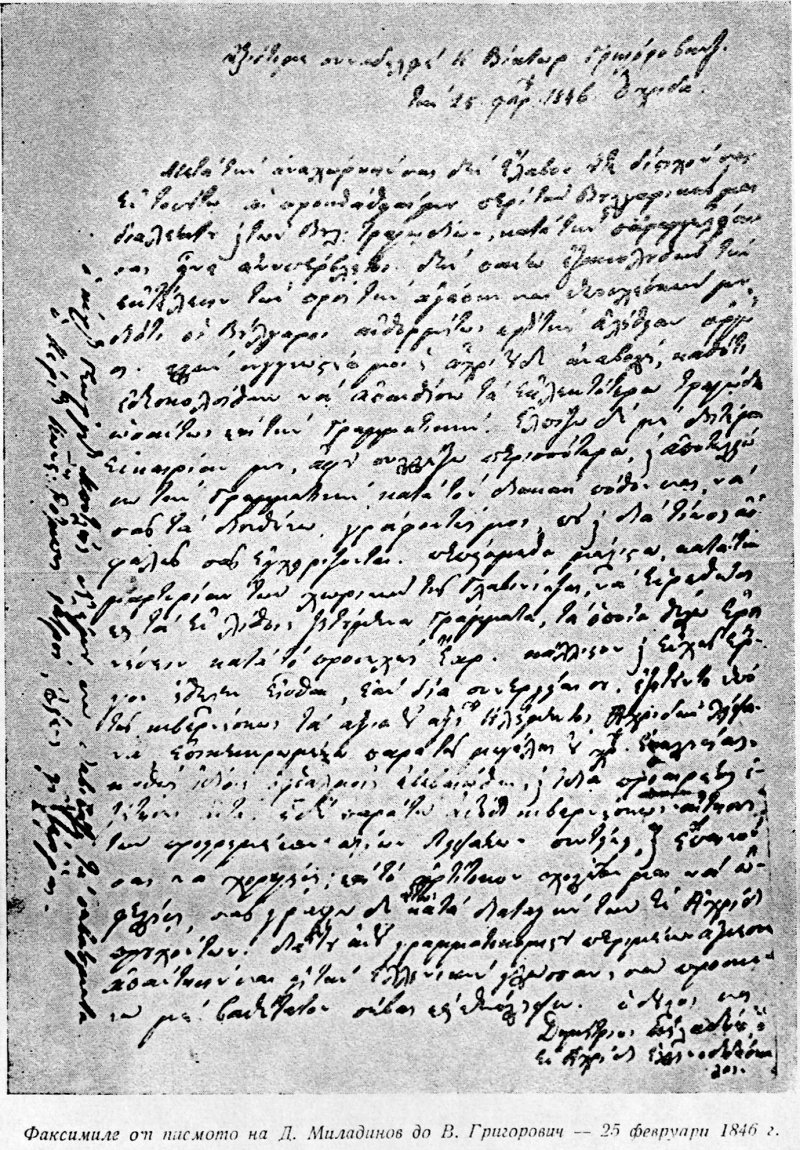
A letter from Dimitar Miladinov to Victor Grigorovich from 25 February 1846 about his search for Bulgarian folk songs and artifacts in Macedonia.

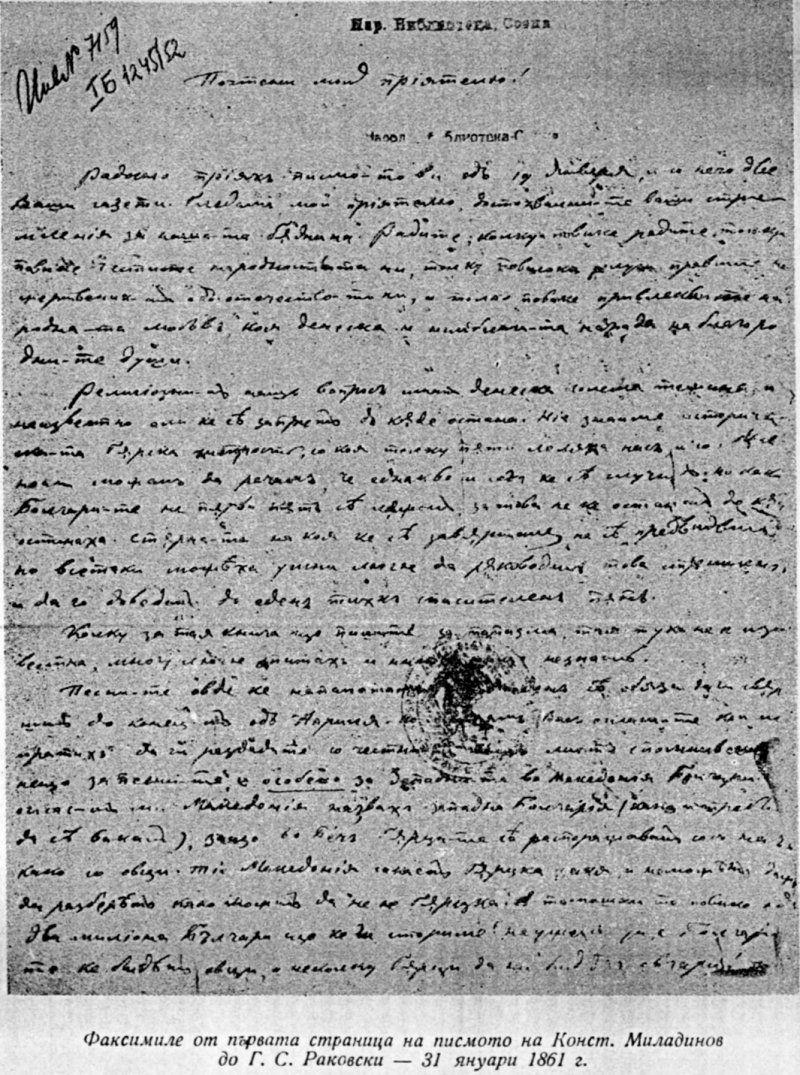
Letter from Konstantin Miladinov to Georgi Rakovski from 8 January 1861 to explain the use of the term Bulgarian in the title of the collection. (Note: "...But I implore you to publish the foreword I sent you in your newspaper, adding a word or two about the songs and especially about the Western Bulgarians in Macedonia. In the foreword I have called Macedonia - Western Bulgaria (as it should be called), because the Greeks in Vienna are treating us just like sheep. They consider Macedonia a Greek province and they are not even able to understand that it is not a Greek region. But what shall we do with the Bulgarians there who are more than two million people? Surely the Bulgarians will not still be sheep with a few Greeks as their shepherds? That time has irrevocably passed and the Greeks will have to be satisfied merely with their sweet dreams. I think that the songs should be distributed chiefly among the Bulgarians, and this is why I have fixed a low price.")

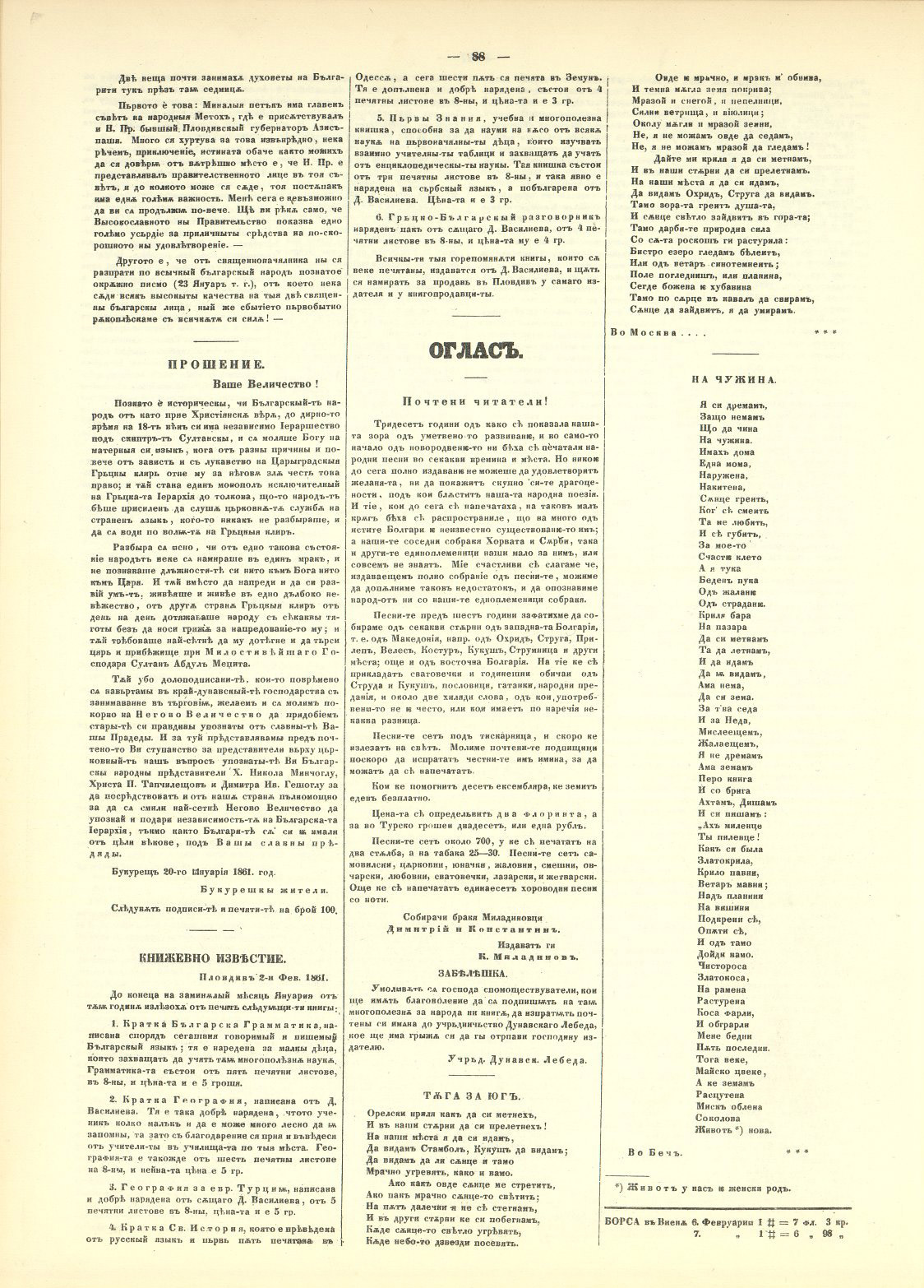
Announcement of the Miladinov brothers on the publication of "Bulgarian Folk Songs" in the newspaper "Dunavski Lebed" issued by Georgi Rakovski, on 7 February 1861.

Bulgarian Folk Songs (Note: Cyrillic: Бѫлгарски народни пѣсни. The original title of the book was written in an unstandardized Bulgarian orthography.) (Note: Modern Bulgarian: Български народни песни, [ˈbəlɡɐrski nɐˈrɔdni ˈpɛsni], Macedonian: Бугарски народни песни, [ˈbugɑrski ˈnɑrɔdni ˈpɛsni].) (Note: The book is known in North Macedonia as the Collection of the Miladinov brothers (Macedonian: Зборникот на Миладиновци, [ˈzbɔrnikɔt nɑ milɑˈdinɔft͡si]).) is a collection of folk songs and traditions from the then Ottoman Empire, especially from the region of Macedonia, but also from Shopluk and Srednogorie, by the Miladinov brothers, published in 1861. The Miladinovs' collection is the greatest single work in the history of Bulgarian folklore studies and has been republished many times. The collection is also considered to have played an important role by the historiography in North Macedonia.

== History ==
=== Collecting and publication ===
The two brothers were interested in Bulgarian folklore. This inspired them to compile the collection. Dimitar was the first one to start collecting songs. He was visited by the Russian Slavist Victor Grigorovich in 1845, who advised him to begin collecting folk songs. In 1846, Dimitar promised to send some folk songs to him in a letter. He and his brother started to collect folk songs. In 1857 Konstantin took the collection they prepared to Moscow with the hope of publishing it there, but could not find a publisher. One of the main problems was that the materials were written down in Bulgarian, but with Greek letters. In Moscow, he received the encouragement of the Bulgarian students there. Vasil Cholakov assisted, providing him with songs, and taking a direct part in transcribing the songs taken down by the Miladinov brothers, in preparing for publishing their collection. The 660 songs were collected mainly between 1854 and 1860. Most of them by the elder brother, Dimitar, who taught in several Macedonian towns (Ohrid, Struga, Prilep, Kukush and Bitola) and was able to put into writing 584 folk songs from the area. Women recited most of the songs. The songs from the Sofia district were supplied by the Sofia schoolmaster Sava Filaretov. Those from Panagyurishte area, were recorded by Marin Drinov and Nesho Bonchev. Rayko Zhinzifov, who went to Russia with the help of Dimitar, was another collaborator.

In 1860 Konstantin addressed Croatian bishop Joseph Strossmayer, who sympathized with the Bulgarian people, with an appeal to publish the collection. Originally, the book was written using Greek orthography. He answered Konstantin's letter positively, but insisted the folk songs should be written in the Cyrillic alphabet. Konstantin transcribed the songs from Greek into Cyrillic. Its preprint was finalized in Đakovo and it was printed in Zagreb by Ante Jakić in 1861. The collection was dedicated to Strossmayer. In the preface to the collection, the brothers expressed their gratitude to Cholakov, among other associates. The book represents an anthology of 660 folk songs, but also folk legends, traditions, rituals, names, riddles, and proverbs. The brothers called the land they collected from as "Western Bulgaria", as they announced regarding the publication of their collection, because they disliked the name "Macedonia" since it was a Greek term. In the book's foreword, Konstantin Miladinov explicitly refers to the collection of works as Bulgarian.

=== Legacy ===
The collecting was well-received by its contemporaries - Lyuben Karavelov, Nesho Bonchev, Ivan Bogorov, Kuzman Shapkarev, Rayko Zhinzifov and others. The Russian scholar Izmail Sreznevsky pointed out in 1863 that the Bulgarians are far from lagging behind other peoples in poetic abilities. Elias Riggs, an American linguist in Istanbul, translated some songs into English and sent them to the American Oriental Society in Princeton, New Jersey. In 1862, Riggs wrote the collection presents an interesting picture of the traditions and fancies prevailing among the masses of the Bulgarian people. The collection also had an impact on the development of the modern Bulgarian literature. The collection has been published many times in Bulgaria. The second edition was published in 1891 by Dimitar's wife Mitra, in the newly liberated Bulgarian Principality. The third was released in 1942, edited by literary historian Mihail Arnaudov. The fourth one was released in 1961, edited by literary historian Petar Dinekov.

In post-war Yugoslav Macedonia the collection was published for the first time in 1962 and later in 1983 under the title "The Collection of the Miladinov Brothers", by literary historians Haralampije Polenaković and Todor Dimitrovski. (Note: Polenaković avoided using the original title because, per him, Cholakov provided songs and anthroponymic materials from Bulgaria to Konstantin Miladinov, with the goal to justify the name "Bulgarian Folk Songs". He cited several statements by Miladinov and his associates where they described the songs he prepared in Moscow as "Macedonian", a term also used by Žinzifov and Rachinski. In 1859 letter he wrote that he had "many Macedonian songs". Polenaković argued that Miladinov couldn't name his collection "Bulgarian Folk Songs" based on the material he gathered, so he sought additional material from Bulgaria. This claim is based on a letter from Vasil Cholakov to Franjo Rački, where Cholakov wrote: "...It may be known to you that when I came to Zagreb last year, my deceased friend Konstantin Miladinov requested me to give him one hundred songs from the eastern regions of Bulgaria, so that he could name his collection 'Bulgarian Folk Songs'. I gratefully fulfilled my friend’s request, as he promised to give me without fail one hundred forints from the local advance payments for my work.") The original references to Bulgarians, Bulgarian culture, Bulgarian language and Macedonia as "Western Bulgaria" were redacted. During the Yugoslav era, the original text, in which the authors explicitly referred to the featured works as Bulgarian, was made unavailable to the public. In 1999, after Macedonia had gained its independence from Yugoslavia, under the auspices of Dimitar Dimitrov, a Bulgarophile minister of culture, the collection was reissued under its original title, which caused backlash from Macedonian historians. The Macedonian State Archive, funded by the Soros Foundation, released a photocopy of the book's cover page in which the word "Bulgarian" was cropped to make it seem that the title was merely "Folk songs collected by the Miladinov brothers Konstantin and Dimitar" and not "Bulgarian folk songs collected by the Miladinov brothers Konstantin and Dimitar". Bulgarian scholars have accused their Macedonian colleagues of falsifying the original edition by deliberately deleting references to Bulgaria. These accusations have received strong support from international academic circles. Although the book contains a number of songs in which the literary characters are mentioned as Bulgarian, Macedonian researchers claim the "Bulgarian" designation appeared in the title shortly prior to the book's publication, and that it was originally was titled "Macedonian Folk Songs". The collection's historical context and its authors' national identity have been disputed between North Macedonia and Bulgaria. Pupils in present-day North Macedonia do not have the access to the book in its original form. In March 2021, a shipment with the original edition of the book, intended for the Bulgarian Cultural Center in Skopje, was denied entry into North Macedonia, which provoked backlash from Bulgarians.

== Sample of the first song in the book ==
English language

Yoan Popov left,
to go on Easter,
on Easter, to plow,
when he reached the halfway,
A Samovila came out,
A Woodland Faerie,
his roads she barred:
- Go back, Yoan Popov,
Do not go on Easter,
on Easter, to plow!
...

Bulgarian orthography

Кинисал ми Йо'ан Попов,
да ми о'ит на Великден,
на Великден на оранье.
И ми пойде до пол-пъти,
и излезе Самовила,
Самовила Самогорска,
пътищата му предстрети:
- Врат' се, врати, Йо'ан Попов,
не одай ми на Великден,
на Великден на оранье!
...

Macedonian orthography

Кинисал ми Јо’ан Попов,
Да ми о’ит на Велигден
На Велигден на орање,
И ми појде до пол-пати,
И излезе Самовила
Самовила Самогорска,
Патиштата му предстрети:
„Врат’ се, врати Јо’ан Попов,
Не одај ми на Велигден
На Велигден на орање!”
...

Original orthography

Кинисалъ ми Јо’анъ Поповъ,
Да ми о’итъ на Велигденъ
На Велигденъ на оранѥ,
И ми пойде до пол-пѫти,
И излезе Самовила
Самовила Самогорска,
Пѫтища-та му предстрети:
„Врат’ сѣ, врати Јо’анъ Поповъ,
Не одай ми на Велигденъ
На Велигденъ на оранѥ!”
...

== See also ==
- Political views on the Macedonian language
- Folk Songs of the Macedonian Bulgarians
