= Hard sign =

Letter of the Cyrillic script

- Ъ ъ
- ᲆ

Usage
- Writing system: Cyrillic
- Type: Alphabetic
- Language of origin: Old Church Slavonic
- Sound values: [ɤ̞], [ə], [ɐ], [ʔ]
- In Unicode: U+042A, U+044A, U+1C86

History
- Development: Ⱏ ⱏ: Ъ ъ
- Transliterations: ǎ, ă, ą, ë, ę, ų, ŭ, a, u, y
- Variations: ᲆ

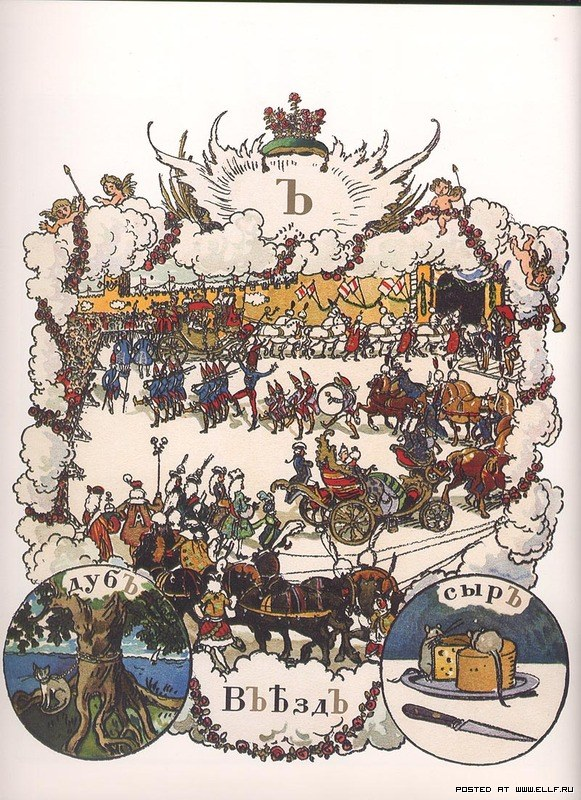
Hard sign, from Alexandre Benois' 1904 Russian alphabet book. It shows dub" (oak), v"ězd" (entry) and syr" (cheese).

The letter Ъ ъ (italics Ъ, ъ) of the Cyrillic script is known as the hard sign (Russian: твёрдый знак, romanized: tvërdyj znak, pronounced [ˈtvʲɵrdɨj ˈznak], Rusyn: твердый знак, romanized: tverdyj znak) in the modern Russian and some varieties of Rusyn alphabet (in Rusyn, ъ could also be known as ір, ir), as yer in Old Church Slavonic (Church Slavonic: ѥръ, romanized: jerъ), as er golyam (ер голям, "big er") in the Bulgarian alphabet, as debelo jer (дебело їер, "thick yer") in pre-reform Serbian orthography, and as ayirish belgisi in the Uzbek Cyrillic alphabet.

Originally in Old Church Slavonic the yer denoted an ultra-short or reduced mid rounded vowel. It is one of two reduced vowels that are collectively known as the yers in Slavic philology.

== Usage ==
=== Bulgarian ===
In Bulgarian, the er goljam ("ер голям") is the 27th letter of the alphabet. It is used for representing the mid back unrounded vowel /ɤ̞/ phoneme, sometimes also notated as a schwa /ə/. It sounds somewhat like the vowel sound in some pronunciations of English "but" [bʌ̘t] or Mandarin "de" (的) [tɤ]. It sounds similar to the Romanian letter "ă" (for example, in "băiat" [bəˈjat̪]) and Estonian letter õ. In unstressed positions (in the same manner as ⟨а⟩), ⟨ъ⟩ is normally pronounced /ɐ/, which sounds like Sanskrit "a" (अ), Portuguese "terra" [ˈtɛxɐ], or the German -er in the word "Kinder" [ˈkʰɪndɐ]. Unlike the schwa sound in English, the Bulgarian /ɤ̞/ can appear in stressed as well as in unstressed syllables, for example in "въ́здух" ['vɤ̞zdux] 'air' or even at the beginning of words (only in the word "ъ́гъл" ['ɤ̞gɐɫ] ‘angle’).

Before the reform of 1945, this sound was written with two letters, "ъ" and "ѫ" ("big yus", denoting a former nasal vowel). Additionally "ъ" was used silently after a final consonant, as in Russian. In 1945 final "ъ" was dropped; and the letter "ѫ" was abolished, being replaced by "ъ" in most cases. However, to prevent confusion with the former silent final "ъ", final "ѫ" was replaced instead with "а" (which has the same sound when not stressed).

It is variously transliterated as ⟨ǎ⟩, ⟨ă⟩, ⟨ą⟩, ⟨ë⟩, ⟨ę⟩, ⟨ų⟩, ⟨ŭ⟩, or simply ⟨a⟩, ⟨u⟩ and even ⟨y⟩.

=== Belarusian and Ukrainian ===
The letter ъ is not used in the alphabets of Belarusian or Ukrainian, its functions being performed by the apostrophe instead. In the Latin Belarusian alphabet (Łacinka), as in Polish, the hard sign's functions are performed by a following j rather than the i that would be present after a palatalized consonant.

=== Rusyn ===
In the Carpatho-Rusyn alphabets of Slovakia and Poland, ъ, called твердый знак tverdyj znak "hard sign" (also known as ір in Cyrillic or yr in Latin alphabets) is the last letter of the alphabet, unlike the majority of Cyrillic alphabets, which place ъ after щ.

In Pannonian Rusyn, ъ is not present in the modern orthography, but had previously been used in the early 20th century prior to the orthographical standardization. The soft sign, ь, called мегки знак (mehki znak), remains, but is chiefly only used after л, н, д, and т, with the latter two largely found in loanwords from Carpathian Rusyn or Hungarian.

=== Macedonian ===
Although Macedonian is most closely related to Bulgarian, its writing system does not use the yer. During the creation of the modern Macedonian orthography in the late 1944 and the first half of 1945, the yer was one of the subjects of arguments. The problem was that the corresponding vowel exists in many dialects of Macedonian, but it is not systematically present in the west-central dialect, the base on which the Macedonian language standard was being developed.

Among the leaders of the Macedonian alphabet and orthography design team, Venko Markovski argued for using the letter yer, much like the Bulgarian orthography does, but Blaže Koneski was against it. An early version of the alphabet promulgated on December 28, 1944, contained the yer, but in the final version of the alphabet, approved in May 1945, Koneski's point of view prevailed, and no yer was used.

The absence of yer leads to an apostrophe often being used in Macedonian to print texts composed in the language varieties that use the corresponding vowel, such as the Bulgarian writer Konstantin Miladinov's poem Т'га за југ (Bulgarian: Тъга за юг).

=== Old Church Slavonic ===
In Old Church Slavonic, the letter signified a reduced mid vowel (see Old Church Slavonic#Vowels). It was called ѥръ, jerъ, and corresponded to Glagolitic ⟨Ⱏ⟩.

=== Russian ===
==== Modern Russian: hard sign ====
In Modern Russian, the letter "ъ" is called the hard sign (твёрдый знак / tvjordyj znak). Historically it was also referred to as ер / jer, as in Church Slavonic, but by the time of Dmitry Ushakov's Dictionary (1935–1940) the term was deemed archaic. It has no phonetic value of its own; it is purely an orthographic device. Its function is to separate a number of prefixes ending in consonants from subsequent morphemes that begin with iotated vowels. In native words, it is therefore only seen in front of the letters "я", "е", "ё", and "ю" (ja, je, jo, and ju transliterated). The hard sign marks the fact that the sound [j] continues to be heard separately in the composition. For example:

- сесть [ˈsʲesʲtʲ] sjestʹ 'sit down'
- съесть [ˈsjesʲtʲ] sʺjestʹ perfective form of 'eat'

It therefore functions as a kind of "separation sign" and has been used only sparingly in the aforementioned cases since the spelling reform of 1918. The consonant before the hard sign often becomes somewhat softened (palatalized) due to the following iotation. As a result, in the twentieth century there were occasional proposals to eliminate the hard sign altogether, and replace it with the soft sign ь, which always marks the softening of a consonant. However, in part because the degree of softening before ъ is not uniform, the proposals were never implemented. The hard sign ъ is written after both native and borrowed prefixes. It is sometimes used before "и" (i), non-iotated vowels or even consonants in Russian transcriptions of foreign names to mark an unexpected syllable break, much like an apostrophe in Latin script (e.g. Чанъань — Chang'an), the Arabic ʽayn (e.g. Даръа — Darʽa [ˈdarʕa]), or combined with a consonant to form a Khoisan click (e.g. Чъхоан — ǂHoan). However, such usage is not uniform and, except for transliteration of Chinese proper names, has not yet been formally codified (see also Russian phonology and Russian orthography).

==== Final yer pre-1918 ====
Before 1918, a hard sign was normally written at the end of a word when following a non-palatal consonant, even though it had no effect on pronunciation. For example, the word for "male cat" was written "котъ" (kotʺ) before the reform, and "кот" (kot) after it. This old usage of ъ was eliminated by the spelling reform of 1918, implemented by the Bolsheviks after the 1917 October Revolution. Because of the way this reform was implemented, the issue became politicized, leading to a number of printing houses in Petrograd refusing to follow the new rules. To force the printing houses to comply, red sailors of the Baltic Fleet confiscated type carrying the "parasite letters". Printers were forced to use a non-standard apostrophe for the separating hard sign, for example:

- pre-reform: съѣздъ (s'jezd')
- transitional: с’езд (s’jezd)
- post-reform: съезд (s'jezd)

In the beginning of the 1920s, the hard sign was gradually restored as the separator. The apostrophe was still used afterward on some typewriters that did not include the hard sign, which became the rarest letter in Russian. In Belarusian and Ukrainian, the hard sign was never brought back, and the apostrophe is still in use today.

According to the rough estimation presented in Lev Uspensky's popular linguistics book A Word On Words (Слово о словах / Slovo o slovakh), which expresses strong support for the reform, the final hard sign made up about 3.5% of printed text and thus wasted paper and ink, which provided the economic grounds for the reform.

Printing houses set up by Russian émigrés abroad kept using the pre-reform orthography for some time, but gradually they adopted the new spelling. Meanwhile, in the USSR, Dahl’s Explanatory Dictionary was repeatedly (1935, 1955) reprinted in compliance with the old rules of spelling and the pre-reform alphabet.

Today the final yer is sometimes used in Russian brand names: the newspaper Kommersant (Коммерсантъ) uses the letter to emphasize its continuity with the pre-Soviet newspaper of the same name. Such usage is often inconsistent, as the copywriters may apply the simple rule of putting the hard sign after a consonant at the end of a word but ignore the other former spelling rules, such as the use of ѣ and і. It is also sometimes encountered in humorous personal writing adding to the text an "old-fashioned flavour" or separately denoting true.

==== Statistics ====
The hard sign is the rarest grapheme of the Russian language. Out of all 200,000 documented words in Russian, only 400 (0.02%) contain the letter Ъ. Despite its rare usage in Russian, it is considered one of the most common letters in Bulgarian.

=== Languages of the Caucasus and Crimean Tatar ===
In Cyrillic orthographies for various languages of the Caucasus, along with the soft sign and the palochka, the hard sign is a modifier letter, used extensively in forming digraphs and trigraphs designating sounds alien in Slavic, such as /q/ and ejectives. For example, in Ossetian, the hard sign is part of the digraphs гъ /ʁ/, къ /kʼ/, пъ /pʼ/, тъ /tʼ/, хъ /q/, цъ /tsʼ/, чъ /tʃʼ/, as well as the trigraphs къу /kʷʼ/ and хъу /qʷ/. The hard sign is used in the Crimean Tatar language for the same purpose. In Chechen and Ingush, the hard sign can represent a glottal stop in addition to its use to represent the ejective consonants used in these languages. It sees limited use in Latin-script transliterations of Caucasian languages to transliterate the palochka, e.g. хӀорджӀаьла khъordjъäla, ГӀалгӀай Gъalgъai.

=== Tajik ===
In the Cyrillic version of the Tajik alphabet, ъ denotes a glottal stop, usually found in Arabic loanwords.

== Related letters and other similar characters ==
- Ы ы : Cyrillic letter Yery
- Ь ь : Cyrillic letter soft sign
- Ӏ ӏ : Cyrillic letter Palochka
- Ҍ ҍ : Cyrillic letter semisoft sign
- Ѣ ѣ : Cyrillic letter yat
- Ƅ ƅ : Latin letter tone 6
- ” : Double quotation mark

== Computing codes ==
Character information
Preview	Ъ		ъ		ᲆ	
Unicode name	CYRILLIC CAPITAL LETTER HARD SIGN		CYRILLIC SMALL LETTER HARD SIGN		CYRILLIC SMALL LETTER TALL HARD SIGN	
Encodings	decimal	hex	dec	hex	dec	hex
Unicode	1066	U+042A	1098	U+044A	7302	U+1C86
UTF-8	208 170	D0 AA	209 138	D1 8A	225 178 134	E1 B2 86
Numeric character reference	&#1066;	&#x42A;	&#1098;	&#x44A;	&#7302;	&#x1C86;
Named character reference	&HARDcy;		&hardcy;			
KOI8-R and KOI8-U	255	FF	223	DF		
Code page 855	159	9F	158	9E		
Code page 866	154	9A	234	EA		
Windows-1251	218	DA	250	FA		
Macintosh Cyrillic	154	9A	250	FA		

== See also ==
- Ğ
- Virama
