= Bulgar alphabet =

Bulgar alphabet may refer to:

- Kuban alphabet, an alphabet in use in Old Great Bulgaria during the 8th to 13th centuries
- Bulgarian alphabet, an alphabet introduced in 1870 by Marin Drinov and reformed in 1945
