= Taga za Yug =

Poem by Konstantin Miladinov

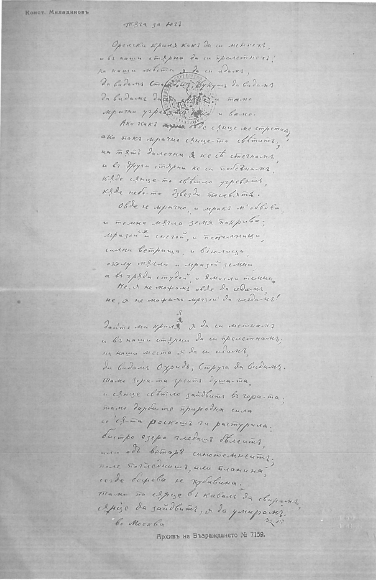
The original of the poem.

Taga za Yug (Originally spelled in non-standardized Bulgarian orthography: Тѫга за югъ, Bulgarian: Тъга за юг, Macedonian: Т'га за југ, in English "Longing for the South") is a poem by the Bulgarian National Revival poet Konstantin Miladinov. It is a patriotic-reflexive song in which the author, who lives in Moscow, expresses his homesickness for his homeland. By the end of the 1850s, Bulgarian poets as Miladinov started to write lyric poetry in vernacular. This poem was written in the Struga dialect.

== Publication ==
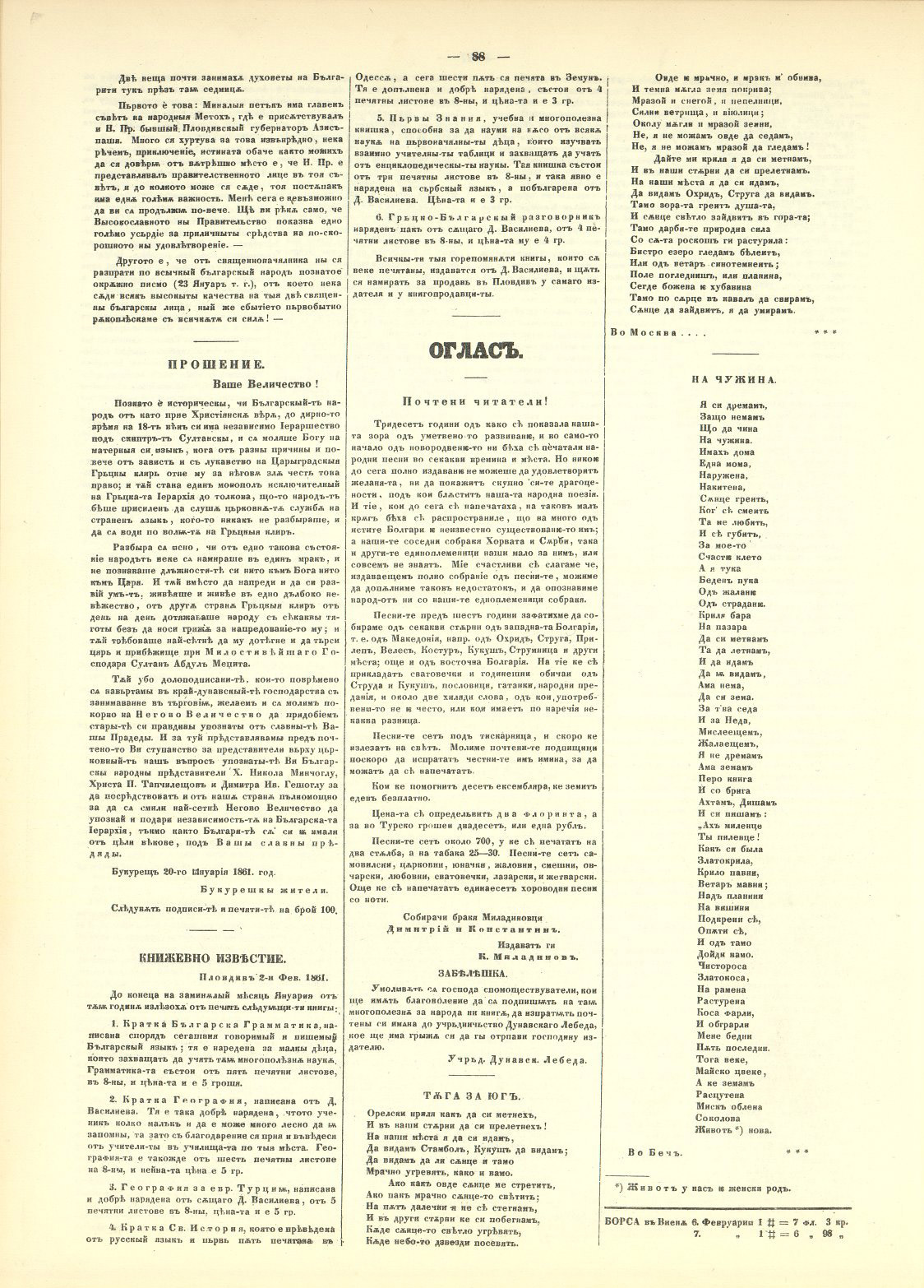
Announcement of the Miladinov Brothers on the publication of Bulgarian Folk Songs and Konstantin Miladinov's poems "Longing for the South" and "Abroad" in the newspaper "Dunavski Lebed".

Konstantin Miladinov was educated in Athens, but later attended Moscow University (1856-60), willing to continue his studies in Slavic language instead of Greek. In Moscow, Konstantin Miladinov worked on the editing of the folk songs he was given by his brother Dimitar Miladinov and his Bulgarian friends, which later both brothers published as a collection called Bulgarian Folk Songs. Miladinov wrote the poem there in vernacular, specifically using his native Struga dialect. The inspiration to write the song came after Dimitar Miladinov sent him a letter to go back to their hometown of Ohrid, where he could continue working as a teacher. The grief of Konstantin for his homeland was strengthened by his poor health. "Longing for the South" was published for the first time by Bulgarian National Revival activist Georgi Rakovski in his newspaper "Dunavski lebed" issued in Belgrade on February 7, 1861. Rakovski's association with Miladinov was a result of their struggle for the national awakening of the Bulgarians.

== Content ==
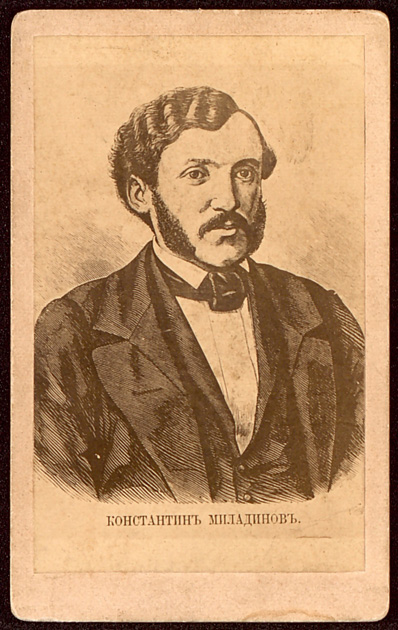
Konstantin Miladinov

During his stay due to studies in Moscow, the author was overcome with feelings of coldness, gloom and loneliness. Because of the cold climate, it is these dark and dreary feelings that nurtured his yearning for the warm sunshine of the South. By exclusively using positive epithets to depict the native soil, the author evoked the painful, unattainable desire to return to his homeland, symbiotically embracing it. In the lyrics, he mentioned several cities then in the Ottoman Empire: Stambol (Istanbul), present-day Turkey, and Kukush (Kilkis), present-day Greece. He also mentioned that he wants to see his "own places" Ohrid and Struga, present-day North Macedonia.

== Legacy ==
Miladinov's work is considered part of the 19th century history of the Bulgarian literature. In North Macedonia the poem is viewed as one of the most important Macedonian literary works under the name T'ga za jug. It is seen as foundational to modern Macedonian poetry and traditionally recited at the opening ceremony of Struga Poetry Evenings. It is included also in the country's school textbooks. It has been translated into more than 60 languages.

The T'ga za Jug wine is named after Miladinov's poem. Produced in North Macedonia, the wine is semi-dry and ruby-red in color. It has been described as being similar in taste to the Italian or Californian Barbera. The rock band "Balkanski Banditi" (Balkan Bandits) with members from both Bulgaria and North Macedonia released an album with that name in 2012.

== See also ==
- Miladinov Brothers
