= Dimitar Dimitrov (writer) =

Macedonian philosopher and politician (born 1937)

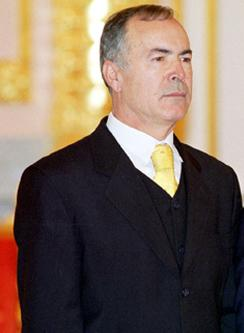
Dimitar Dimitrov

Dimitar Dimitrov (Macedonian: Димитар Димитров; born 1937) is a Macedonian former governmental minister, diplomat, professor of philosophy, and writer.

== Life ==
He was born in Chrisa (Cakoni), Greece, in 1937. His family fled to the Socialist Republic of Macedonia during the Greek Civil War in 1948. He completed his studies in a gymnasium and graduated in philosophy in the Philosophical Faculty in Skopje. Dimitrov received his master's degree in Ljubljana and his doctorate in Zagreb. He worked as a professor in a gymnasium, editor in the publishing house "Kultura" (Culture) and a professor in the University of Skopje.

Dimitrov was the Minister of Culture (1991 – 1992) in the first government led by Nikola Kljusev, and the Minister of Education (1998 – 1999) of the Republic of Macedonia in the government led by Ljubčo Georgievski, the Ambassador (2000 – 2003) of the Republic of Macedonia to Russia. Under his auspices, sources on the history of Macedonia were published, which questioned the established historical version, such as the folklore collection of the Miladinov brothers under its original title Bulgarian Folk Songs, Report of the International Commission on the Balkan Wars, the personal diary of the Metropolitan of Kastoria, Germanos Karavangelis, etc. It resulted in public scandals and he was dismissed from his position. He opposed the identitarian narrative as part of the antiquization policy promoted by the Macedonian government under Nikola Gruevski.

He has a reputation for being a Bulgarophile intellectual in his country. In his 1999 book The Name and the Mind, Dimitrov claimed that there was a process of de-Bulgarization in the 20th century on the territory of North Macedonia. He also claimed that the Macedonian language is Serbianized. The book was translated into Bulgarian and edited with an afterword by former Bulgarian president Zhelyu Zhelev, which caused negative reactions in Skopje.

Dimitrov is an author of philosophical, political and children's books. He published three books with short stories for children: "Shepherd boy" (1960), "Goodbye, childhood" and "When we are children" (1962). He is married and is the father of former Macedonian foreign minister Nikola Dimitrov.
