= Palochka =

Cyrillic letter

- Ӏ ӏ
- 1

Usage
- Writing system: Cyrillic
- Type: Alphabetic
- Language of origin: Languages of the Caucasus
- Sound values: [ʔ]; [ʕ]; [◌ˀ]; [◌ˁ]; [◌ʼ]
- In Unicode: U+04C0, U+04CF

History
Development
F1
    - 𐤀
      - 𐡀
        - 𐢀 ,𐢁
          - ا
            - Ӏ ӏ
- Time period: late 1930s–present
- Variations: 1

Other
- Writing direction: left-to-right

Palochka (Note: Russian: палочка, [ˈpaɫət͡ɕkə], lit. "stick", pl. палочки, [ˈpaɫət͡ɕkʲɪ]) (Ӏ ӏ; italic: Ӏ ӏ) is a letter in the Cyrillic script. This letter was introduced to the Cyrillic script in the late 1930s as the Hindu-Arabic digit ⟨1⟩. On Cyrillic keyboards, it is often typeset as the Roman numeral ⟨I⟩. Unicode currently supports both caseless/capital Palochka at U+04C0 and a rarer lower-case Palochka at U+04CF. Palochka marks glottal(ized) and pharyngeal(ized) consonants.

== Form ==
The letter looks similar to the digit 1. Its uppercase form resembles the Latin Letter I (I i) in uppercase form, while its lowercase form resembles the Latin letter L (L l) in lowercase form.

== History ==
The Cyrillic palochka was derived directly from the Arabic letter alif ⟨ا⟩. The name of the letter comes from a diminutive form of the Russian word палка (translit. palka), which means "stick" (as in, a long thin piece of wood). In the early days of the Soviet Union, many of the non-Russian Cyrillic alphabets contained only letters found in the Russian alphabet to keep them compatible with Russian typewriters. Sounds absent from Russian were marked with digraphs and other letter combinations. The palochka was the only exception because the numerical digit 1 was used instead of the letter. In fact, on many Russian typewriters, the character looked not like the digit 1 but like the Roman numeral I with serifs. That is still common because the palochka is not present in most standard keyboard layouts (and, for some of them, not even the similar-looking Cyrillic-script letter dotted i ⟨І⟩) or common fonts and so it cannot be easily entered or reliably displayed on many computer systems. For example, even the official site of the People's Assembly of the Republic of Ingushetia uses the digit 1 instead of the palochka.

== Usage ==
In the alphabets of Abaza, Avar, Chechen, Dargwa, Ingush, Lak, Lezgian, Tabassaran, and Tsakhur, it is a modifier letter which signals the preceding consonant as an ejective or pharyngeal consonant; this letter has no phonetic value on its own.

In Kabardian, the palochka has its own phonetic value, representing a glottal stop /ʔ/ (like the ⟨tt⟩ in RP button).

- Example from Kabardian: елъэӀуащ [jaɬaˈʔʷaːɕ], "he asked her for something"

In Avar, it represents an ejective consonant.

- Example from Avar: кӀалъазе [kʼaˈɬaze], "to speak"

In Chechen, the palochka makes a preceding stop or affricate ejective if voiceless, or pharyngealized if voiced, but also represents the pharyngealized glottal plosive /ʔˤ/ (like the ayn in Arabic, but more abrupt, usually transcribed /ʡ/) when it does not follow a stop or affricate. As an exception, in the digraph ⟨хӀ⟩, it produces the voiceless glottal fricative /h/. Ingush is similar.

- Examples from Chechen: йоӀ [juo̯ʔˤ], "girl" and хӀорджӀаьла [hordʒˤæla], "shark"

Exceptionally among the Caucasian languages, Abkhaz does not use the palochka, but instead uses a series of special letters to distinguish ejective and non-ejective (aspirated) consonants.

== Computing codes ==
Character information
Preview	Ӏ		ӏ	
Unicode name	CYRILLIC LETTER PALOCHKA		CYRILLIC SMALL LETTER PALOCHKA	
Encodings	decimal	hex	dec	hex
Unicode	1216	U+04C0	1231	U+04CF
UTF-8	211 128	D3 80	211 143	D3 8F
Numeric character reference	&#1216;	&#x4C0;	&#1231;	&#x4CF;

The lowercase form of the palochka was added to Unicode 5.0 in July 2006.

== See also ==
- Cyrillic characters in Unicode
