= Rayko Zhinzifov =

Bulgarian poet (1839–1877)

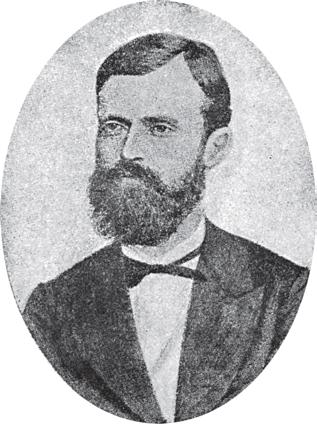
Rayko Zhinzifov

Rayko Ivanov (Yoanov) Zhinzifov or Rajko Ivanov (Jovanov) Žinzifov, (Bulgarian: Райко Иванов (Йоанов) Жинзифов, Macedonian: Рајко Иванов (Јованов) Жинзифов; 15 February 1839 – 15 February 1877), born Ksenofont Dzindzifi (Cyrillic: Ксенофонт Дзиндзифи), was a Bulgarian National Revival poet and translator from Veles in today's North Macedonia, who spent most of his life in the Russian Empire.

== Biography ==
Zhinzifov was born on 15 February 1839 into an Aromanian family in Veles in the Ottoman Empire, today in North Macedonia. His father Yoan Dzindzifi was a Hellenophile, who named him Xenophon (Ksenofont) and taught him Greek, although he also gained Slavic literacy. He sent him to study at a Greek secondary school. In 1855, he moved to Prilep and met Dimitar Miladinov. He became an assistant teacher in Prilep at Dimitar Miladinov's school in 1856. Miladinov sent him to teach in Kukush (modern Kilkis, Greece) in the next year. Under his influence, he abandoned his Hellenophile views and Miladinov was the one who started calling him Rayko.

Zhinzifov went to the Russian Empire with the aid of Miladinov, in July 1858, in pursuit of higher education. He arrived in Odessa (modern Ukraine), where he became close with Georgi Rakovski. He studied at a local gymnasium there. Inspired by Rakovski, he changed his Greek birth name Xenophon to the Bulgarian Rayko. At the end of the year, at the invitation of Konstantin Miladinov, he moved to Moscow, where he joined the Slavic Charity Committee. In 1860, he enrolled into the Faculty of History and Philology at Moscow University. He had a scholarship of 20,000 rubles but it was not enough to cover his expenses so he requested money from his father, who did not answer. The Slavic Committee helped him instead. Zhinzifov became close to the Slavophiles in Moscow, who provided him with both material and moral support, and became an adherent of Slavophilia himself. He graduated from the Faculty of History and Philology in 1864.

Zhinzifov lived among the young Bulgarian diaspora in Moscow, along with Lyuben Karavelov, Nesho Bonchev, Konstantin Miladinov, Vasil Popovich, etc., and issued the Brotherly Labour magazine. In the Russian press of the time, Zhinzifov was particularly active in the information of the Russian society about the tough fate of the Bulgarian people under Ottoman rule. He co-operated with the Bulgarian newspapers Danubian Dawn, Macedonia, Liberty, Bulgarian Bee, Age and Time, the magazines Chitalishte, Periodical Magazine, Bulgarian Booklets, etc. He also contributed to the Russian periodicals Moscow, Moscow News, Den (Day), etc. Zhinzifov spent time in Ottoman Macedonia in 1866 before returning to the Russian Empire and acquiring Russian citizenship. In early 1868, he became a member of the Moscow Slavic Committee. His work in the committee gave him the opportunity to help Bulgarian schools (where books were sent), Bulgarian students studying in Russia and he supported a project of founding a girls' school for the South Slavs in Russia. On 8 February 1868, at the suggestion of Nil Popov, Zhinzifov was elected as a member of the Ethnographic Department of the Imperial Society of Lovers of Natural Science, Anthropology and Ethnography. He was a teacher of Greek in the Lazarev Institute of Oriental Languages, as well as two Moscow gymnasiums. In 1870, Zhinzifov was elected as a member of the Bulgarian Literary Society (modern Bulgarian Academy of Sciences). He died in 1877, on his 38th birthday, in Moscow.

== Works, translations and views ==
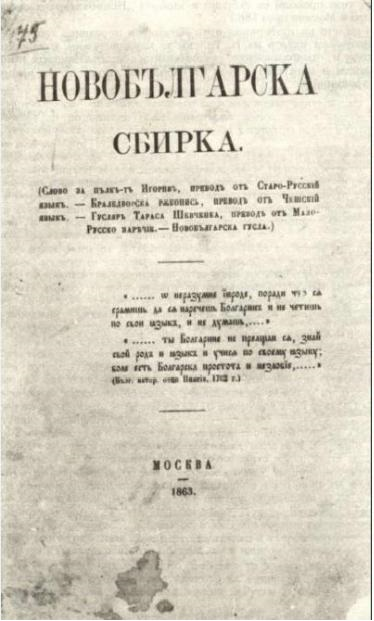
New Bulgarian Collection, Moscow, 1863

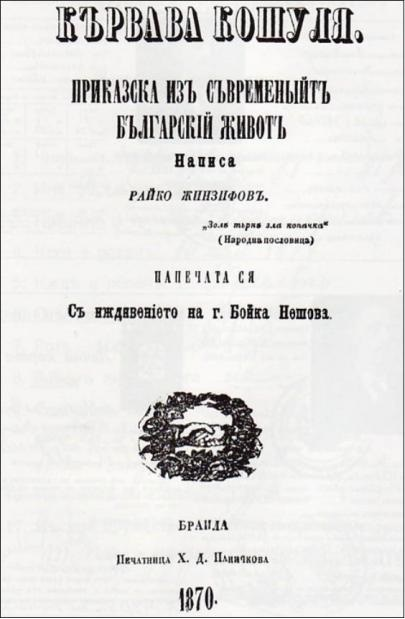
"Karvava koshulya" (Bloody Shirt; A story about the modern Bulgarian life), Braila, 1870

Some of his notable poems include:

- Град (City)
- Кървава Кошуля (Bloody Shirt)
- Гусляр в собор (Harper at a fair)
- Охрид (Ohrid)
- Жалба (Lament)
- Галаб (Pigeon)
- Вдовитса (Widow)
- До българската майка (To the Bulgarian mother)
- Сон (Dream)
- Прошетба (A Walk)

While he was a student (in 1863), Zhinzifov published his first book in Bulgarian in Moscow - Novobolgarska sbirka (New Bulgarian Collection). The book was prominent in the Russian press. The newspaper Day published a positive review in the same year. On the other hand, in the newspaper Bulgarian Bee, a review of the book was published by Karavelov, who criticized Zhinzifov for his Slavophile views. He wrote in two languages: Bulgarian and Russian (Zhinzifov wrote poetry in Bulgarian and journalistic pieces in Russian). Zhinzifov inserted Russian words into modern Bulgarian. Zhinzifov translated Václav Hanka's 'Rukopis Královédvorský' (Manuscript of the King's Court, a forgery of the early 19th century, although Zhinzifov was not aware about its nature), Old East Slavic text The Tale of Igor's Campaign, poems by Taras Shevchenko, into Bulgarian. The themes of his poetry were mostly patriotic and it was strongly influenced by the work of the Ukrainian poet Taras Shevchenko. Due to his poetical heritage, he has been described as a Romantic poet. He had two works which he did not get to complete, such as "Road builder in Macedonia, or otherwise a geographical and statistical description of Macedonia" and a Russian-Bulgarian dictionary. His Bulgarian works contributed to the Bulgarian national revival.

Zhinzifov was conservative and an Orthodox Christian. He opposed all cultural imports (dress, dances, languages, foreign words) as a Slavophile with the aim to preserve traditional patriarchal morality. He expressed love for music, theater and painting. Zhinzifov was of the view that Bulgarians constituted the majority in Vardar Macedonia and Pirin Macedonia, which was confirmed by international diplomats. In all of his works Zhinzifov regarded himself as a Bulgarian, his language - Bulgarian, his fellow compatriots - Macedonian Bulgarians, and his homeland as Bulgaria. Zhinzifov denied the existence of Macedonians and Thracians as separate nations. He defined the boundaries of his homeland as consisting of Macedonia (which he often called "Lower Bulgaria"), Thrace and Upper Bulgaria (or "Balkan Bulgaria").

== Legacy ==
In his honor Rayko Nunatak on Graham Land in Antarctica was named after him. The historiography in North Macedonia regards him as an ethnic Macedonian writer. Schools in North Macedonia are named in honor of him. Writers such as Ivan Vazov and Petko Slaveykov denied the value of his work, while others like Anton Strashimirov and Stefan Mladenov defended him. His poetry has been republished.
