= Reforms of Bulgarian orthography =

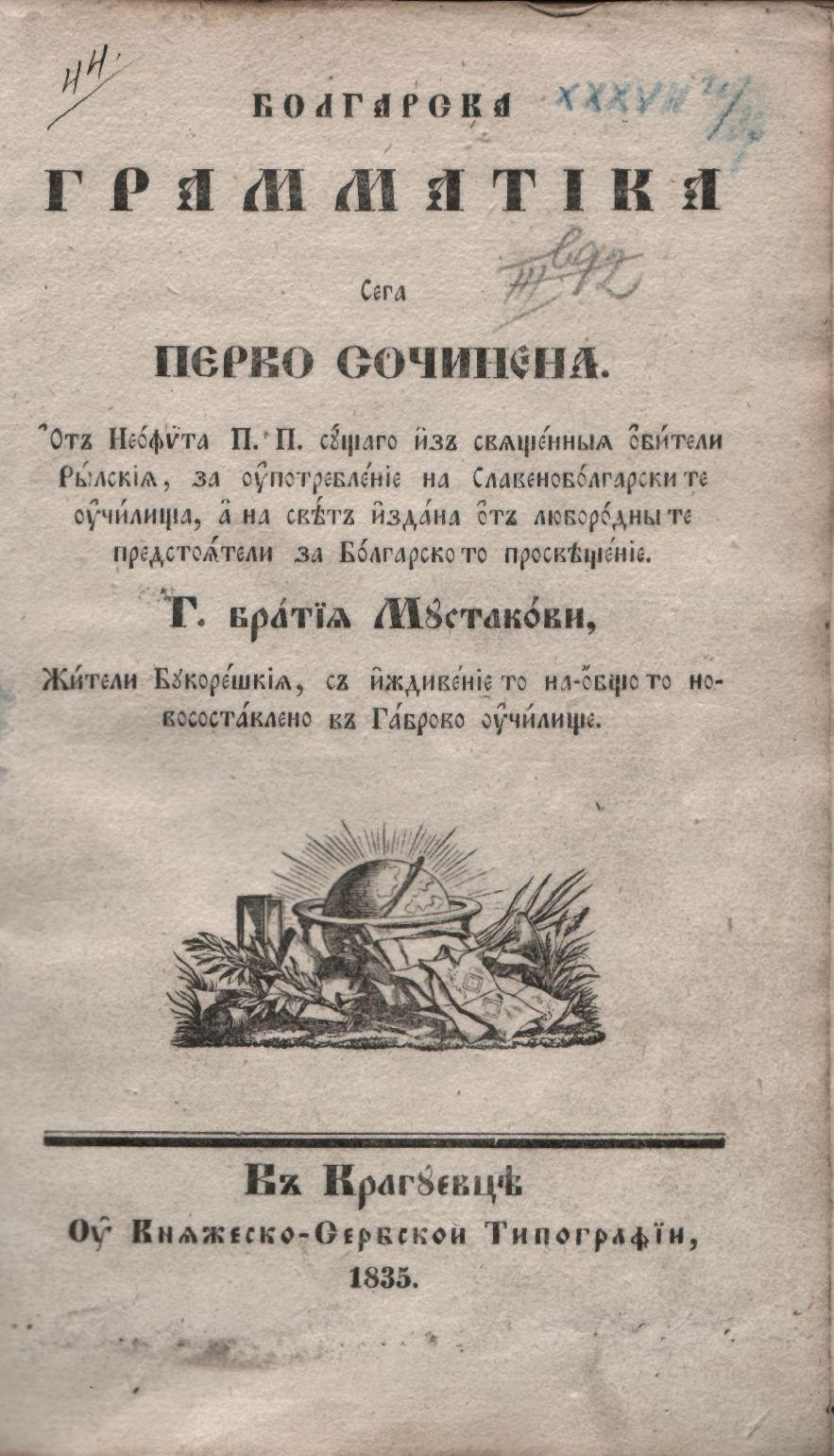
Front cover of the first grammar book of the modern Bulgarian language published by Neofit Rilski in 1835 in unstandardized orthography, printed in Serbian royal printing office in Kragujevac .

The Reforms of Bulgarian Orthography are historical changes to the spelling and writing system of the Bulgarian language.

== Ottoman Era ==
Until the 19th century, Bulgarian was predominantly a spoken language, with no standardized written form of the vernacular dialects. Formal written communication was usually in the Church Slavonic language. For a long, time the Cyrillic script was primarily associated with religious texts, and as such, it was more resistant to changes. The early Cyrillic alphabet from the 9th century, developed in the First Bulgarian Empire, contained 44 letters for 44 sounds. However, by the 19th century, the Bulgarian sound system had reduced its size, which would necessitate reforms.

Formally, people would still write the language with the Church Slavonic writing system. However, informally, most would instead write with Russian rules (adapted to suit Bulgarian), such as о and е for etymological ъ and ь or і for /i/ before vowels (for example, "Болгарія" instead of modern "България"). The definite article, which was unique to Bulgarian among Slavic languages, would be written variously as a suffix (човекътъ), a suffix with a hyphen (човекъ-тъ), and a particle after the word (човекъ тъ). Two schools of thought would emerge in the 19th century relating to the question of the Bulgarian orthography - the conservative Plovdiv school and the more moderate Tarnovo school. They agreed on the following issues:

- The traditional letters ѣ (pronounced as я or е) and ы (pronounced as и) are fully retained in their etymological locations (вѣра/вяра, рыба/риба).
- Following the Russian model, the letter і is used instead of и before vowels (мнѣніе, періодъ).
- The letters ѫ and ъ, which represent the same sound, are used etymologically based on the origin of the word (мѫка, мъхъ).
- The letters ѫ and ѭ are retained in verb conjugations (плетѫ, плетѫтъ, знаѭ, знаѭтъ).
- The letters ъ and ь are retained as silent letters at the end of words (човекъ, конь). At the time it was believed that, when the word was suffixed with a definite article, the silent Yer would be voiced - човекъ became човекътъ or човекъ-тъ, конь became коньтъ or конь-тъ (the ь would be pronounced as an iotated ъ - similar to a ѭ or unstressed я).

The two schools would differ on many cases, such as the treatment of the definite article (the supporters of the Tarnovo school would fuse the article with the word, while their counterparts from Plovdiv would put a hyphen before it), the remnants of the old Slavic vocalic (syllabic) р and л, and the treatment of the archaic case forms, which only remained in writing (other than the vocative case, which would be fully retained). However, by the 1870's, the two schools were falling out of fashion, being seen as too conservative by keeping archaic letters like ы and і, both pronounced as /i/. Instead, a more decentralised era would again take hold, similar to previous decades. Many people, such as Lyuben Karavelov, would write in their own personal orthographies, with changes depending on the author's preference.

As Bulgaria was then part of the Ottoman Empire, in 1869, Bulgarian émigrés founded the so called Bulgarian Literary Society in Brăila, Kingdom of Romania, with Marin Drinov as its chairman. In a number of articles for the magazine "Periodic Magazine," he examined problems of orthography and grammar in the Bulgarian language. In the end, it was indeed Drinov's reform which would become the most widely used, even during the Ottoman Empire. It was defined by the following characteristics:

- The letters ы and і are removed from the alphabet (along with archaic characters such as ѥ and ѳ).
- The letters ѫ and ъ are retained in etymological positions (мѫка, мъхъ).
- The letters ѫ and ѭ are retained in verb conjugations (плетѫ, плетѫтъ, знаѭ, знаѭтъ).
- The silent letters ъ and ь at the end of words are retained, and pronounced as vowels when a definite article is added.
- The partial article (used when the noun is not the subject) is abolished, and the full article (when the noun is the subject) is always used instead.
- Drinov also believed that the letter щ and the silent yers should be removed, however, this was never put into practice.

Drinov's spelling system would play an important role after the liberation of Bulgaria, and many of its innovations can be seen in the modern language today.

== Late 19th Century ==
In 1878 a new Bulgarian Principality was founded. For the first 15 years of its life, the orthography question would be put on hold, as the government would worry about other things instead. During this time, Marin Drinov's writing system would remain the most used, and alternatives would not catch on. The first new reform would come in 1892, during the rule of Stefan Stambolov. The then-Minister of Enlightenment, Georgi Zhivkov, would appoint a commission to solve the problem of the orthography. It included high-profile teachers and philologists. After a short period, the commission would come up with a radical new writing system. It was characterised by its removal of traditional letters, moving away from Russian and closer to Serbian. Most agree that this was politically motivated, likely due to Stambolov's notoriously anti-Russian government. The reform is defined by these traits:

- The letters й and ь are removed. Instead they are replaced by the former decimal i, і, named the iota or yota (маіка, коі, синіо).
- The letters ю and я are removed and replaced by the sequences іу and іа (коіа, іабълка, съіуз).
- The letter ѫ is replaced by ъ normally and а in verb conjugations (мъж, ръка, чета, четат).
- The letter ѭ, which is only used in verb conjugations, is replaced by іа (търпіа, правіа).
- The letter ѣ is retained only when pronounced as я, otherwise, it is replaced by е (млѣко but млечно, голѣмо but големи).
- The silent ь and ъ at the end of words are abolished.
- The usage of doubled consonants in loanwords is removed. This change is still in modern Bulgarian (програма, акумулатор).

The reform was not liked by the population, who saw it as too radical by removing so many traditional letters, and it never managed to be implemented before the end of Stambolov's regime. Most people would continue writing with Drinov's spelling.

Another reform was created by a commission by Konstantin Velichkov, the next minister of enlightenment. The reform entailed:

- The traditional letters ю, я and й are retained.
- The letter ѫ is replaced by ъ and а.
- The letter ѭ is replaced by я.
- The letter ѣ is replaced by е or я depending on the pronunciation (голямъ, големи).
- The word-final yers are retained.

Despite this reform being considerably less radical, it would not catch on either.

In 1898, the minister of enlightenment was Ivan Vazov, and he too would attempt to reform the Bulgarian spelling. His reforms were:

- The partial article is reinstated.
- The suffix нье is written how its pronounced, as не (правене instead of правенье).
- The definite article -ий is replaced by -иятъ and -ия.

This reform would fail to catch on simply because Vazov would resign before it could be implemented. The new minister, Todor Ivanchov, would immediately start addressing the spelling. His new orthography would be the same as Vazov's, with the following changes:

- The letters ѫ and ѭ are removed from verb conjugations and replaced by а and я. The letter ѭ itself is fully removed, as verb conjugations are the only place where it is used.
- The use of doubled consonants in foreign words is abolished (програма, клас, Русия).
- Consonants are always used in their traditional locations even if they are devoiced (градъ, not гратъ).
- The letter ѣ can be written as е in words where it is never pronounced я (река, беда).

Being a mixture of traditional spelling and practical reform, this orthography would become widely accepted. It would go on to be used until 1945.

== 20th Century ==
In 1923, under the prime ministership of Aleksandar Stamboliyski, Stoyan Omarchevski would form another commission on reforming the Bulgarian spelling. He wanted to simplify the spelling so that, in his eyes, people and learners would have an easier time. The reform was:

- The removal of the ъ and ь from the alphabet. They are removed at the end of words and replaced with another letter otherwise.
- The sound ъ is represented by the letter ѫ, regardless of the origin (мѫка (from мѫка), мѫх (from мъхъ), пѫрво (from пьрво)).
- The letter ѣ is abolished and replaced by я or е depending on its pronunciation (голям, големи).
- The letter ь in the definite article -ьт is replaced by я (конят, денят).
- The ь as a letter representing softness is replaced by й (синйо, актйор).
- The full & partial definite articles become not grammatical, but phonetic. The full article is used when the word afterwards begins with a vowel, while the partial article is used when it begins with a consonant.

This spelling would not be seen well by the more conservative, who saw it as destroying symbols of "Bulgarianness". However the reform would remain popular among communists and agrarians.

The orthography would, in the end, last only two years, because after Stamboliyski's murder, it would be repealed. Several parts of it were, however, kept, such as the removal of the vowel ь and its replacement by ъ and я. The spelling would remain used by communists, which led to it being banned in 1928.

The last spelling reform would happen in 1945. The new communist government, the Fatherland Front ("Отечествен фронт", in Bulgarian), would create a new spelling, less radical than the one of Omarchevski. The reform would be:

- The full and partial articles are fully retained as in the orthography of Ivanchov (this was not popular among the people making the reforms, but it was still retained).
- The letter ѫ is abolished and replaced by ъ in all cases, except for the word сѫ ("са", meaning "(they) are"), where it is replaced by а instead.
- The letter ѣ is abolished and replaced by я and e according to pronunciation.
- The ъ at the end of words is abolished, where it makes no sound.
- The ь at the end of words is abolished, but the letter is retained for softness before the letter о.

The orthography was published in 1945 by the regency council, and the old orthography was deemed illegal. The reform was executed in 6 months, but its implementation continued for over 20 years.

== See also ==
- Bulgarian alphabet
