= Kabardian =

Kabardian may refer to:

- Kabardians, a Circassian tribe of the Northwest Caucasus
- Kabardian language, the Northwest Caucasian language spoken by them
- Kabardian horse, a breed originating from the same region

== See also ==
- Kabardino-Balkaria, a republic in North Caucasus, federal subject of Russia
