= Kuzman Shapkarev =

Bulgarian folklorist and ethnographer

- Кузман Шапкарев
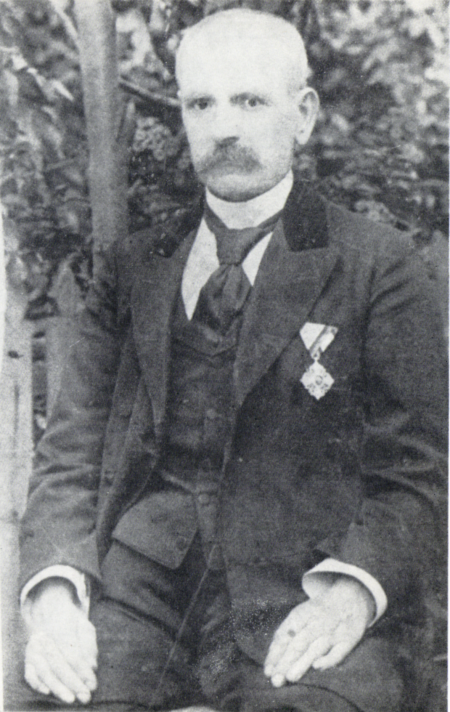
- Kuzman Shapkarev decorated with the Bulgarian Order "For Civil Merit", 5th Class
- Born: 1 February 1834; Ohrid, Manastir Vilayet, Ottoman Empire
- Died: 18 March 1909 (aged 75); Sofia, Bulgaria
- Occupations: Writer, teacher, folklorist
- Spouse(s): Elisaveta Miladinova-Shapkareva (d. 1870); Ekaterina Shapkareva
- Children: Kliment Shapkarev, Ivan Shapkarev
- Writing career
- Language: Bulgarian
- Period: Bulgarian National Revival

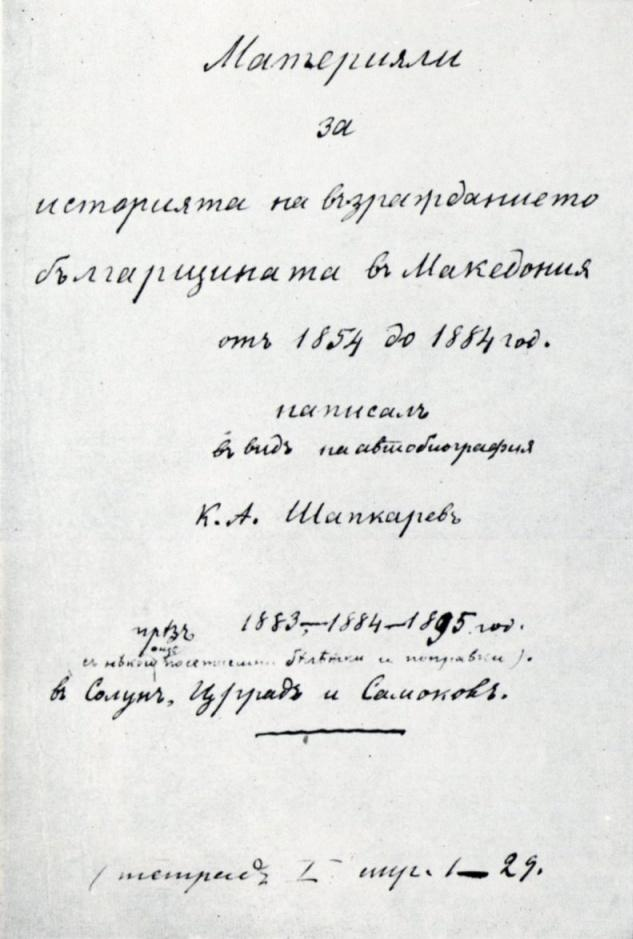
The title page of the autobiography of Shapkarev "Materials on the history of the revival of the Bulgarian national idea in Macedonia."

Kuzman Anastasov Shapkarev (Bulgarian and Macedonian: Кузман Анастасов Шапкарев, romanized: Kuzman Anastasov Šapkarev; 1 January 1834 – 18 March 1909) was a Bulgarian folklorist and ethnographer from the Ottoman region of Macedonia, author of textbooks and ethnographic studies, and a figure of the Bulgarian National Revival.

== Life ==
Kuzman Shapkarev was born in Ohrid in 1834. Shapkarev initially studied under his uncle Yanaki Strezov. He was a teacher in a number of Bulgarian schools in Ohrid, Bitola, Prilep, Kukush, Thessaloniki, (1854–1883). In these towns, he was especially active in introducing the Bulgarian language in local schools. Не initiated the establishment of two Bulgarian high schools (Bulgarian men's high school and Bulgarian girls' high school) in Thessaloniki in the 1880s.

He wrote the following textbooks: "A Bulgarian Primer" (1866), "A Big Bulgarian Reader" (1868), "Mother tongue" (1874), "Short Land description (Geography)" (1868), "Short Religion Book" (1868), which were published in Istanbul. Shapkarev criticized the dominance of eastern Bulgarian and even declared that it was incomprehensible in Macedonia. In his Great Bulgarian Textbook (Golema balgarska chitanka) from 1868, which he authored under the pseudonym "One Macedonian" (Edin Makedonets), he stated his intention to write in a language understandable to his compatriots, the Macedonian Bulgarians. He also announced a project of a dictionary that would contain translation from Macedonian into Upper Bulgarian and vice versa. This activity was condemned by the Bulgarian press, which even accused him of advocating the existence of a separate Macedonian language and a distinct history of the Macedonian people. Shapkarev regarded his language as Bulgarian and adhered to Bulgarian nationalism. Bulgarian philologist Marin Drinov rejected his proposal for a mixed eastern and western Bulgarian (Macedonian) basis of the Bulgarian standard language. The Russian philologist Pyotr Draganov described Shapkarev's work as "protecting the Macedonian dialects from assimilation by the Bulgarianness".

Shapkarev was a contributor of many Bulgarian newspapers and magazines – "Tsarigradski vestnik" (Constantinople newspaper), "Gayda" (Bagpipe), "Macedonia", "Pravo" (Justice), "Savetnik" (Adviser), "Balgarska pchela" (Bulgarian bee) and others. Shapkarev was a collaborator of the revolutionary Georgi Rakovski and in the field of ethnography, he assisted the Miladinov brothers.

He married Dimitar Miladinov's daughter Elisaveta Miladinova but she died in 1870. After 1883 he lived in Eastern Rumelia and Bulgaria – in Plovdiv, Sliven, Stara Zagora, Vraca and Orhanie (Botevgrad). Along with his scientific and public occupation in Bulgaria, he worked as a notary and a judge.

From 1900 he was a regular member of the Bulgarian Literary Society. He died in 1909.

His autobiographical book is called "Materials for the Revival of Bulgarian national spirit in Macedonia".

== Legacy ==
His first son Kliment Shapkarev was an activist of the Internal Macedonian Revolutionary Organization, while the second – Ivan Shapkarev was a high-ranking Bulgarian Army officer. His grandson Petar Shapkarev was a Bulgarian economist and chairman of the Macedonian Scientific Institute, while his great-grandson Mihail Shapkarev was a Bulgarian sculptor.

In the International Congress of Slavists in 1968, Macedonian academics attempted to present Shapkarev as a proponent for a separate Macedonian language. In response, their Bulgarian colleagues publicly read a passage from Shapkarev where he declared his Bulgarian ethnicity. He is an important figure in the Bulgarian and Macedonian historical narrative, with him being regarded as an ethnic Macedonian in the latter narrative. Shapkarev Buttress on the Fallières Coast, Antarctica, is named after Kuzman Shapkarev. The Kuzman Shapkarev Secondary School, one of the first specialized high schools in Sofia, carries his name.

== Works ==
=== Scientific works ===
- Rusalii. The old and too interesting Bulgarian custom preserved in Southern Macedonia, Plovdiv, 1884
- "The Serbian Greatideas' endeavours and our scientifists", 1888
- "Several notes about Macedono-Slav collection of P. Draganov" 1895
- "Collection of folk monuments (Bulgarian folk tales and beliefs), 1885
- Collection of Bulgarian Folklore (Сборник от български народни умотворения), vol. І-ІІІ, Sofia, 1891–1894
- Materials for the Biography of the Miladinov Brothers - Dimitar and Konstantin (Материали за животоописанието на Братя Миладинови, Димитрия и Константина), Plovdiv 1884

=== Textbooks ===
- A Bulgarian Primer, 1868
- A Big Bulgarian Reader, 1868
- Short Land description for children, 1868
- Short History of the Old and New Testament and a short cathehism, 1868
- Holy Gospel or a collection of gospel readings, 1870
- A collection of the Apostolic readings, 1870
- Mother tongue, 1874
- The Bulgarian Folklore Collection (Сборник от български народни умотворения), in several volumes:
  - Books I, III, IV, V, VI - Песни (Songs)
  - Book VII: Български обичаи, обряди, суеверия и костюмы (Bulgarian customs, rituals, beliefs and costumes), 1891
  - Books VIII and IX: Български прикаски и вѣрования съ прибавление на нѣколко Македоновлашки и Албански (Bulgarian folktales and beliefs with some Macedo-Romanian and Albanian) 1892, 1894 (same, in a modern edition, with modernized spelling)
  - (Note: Book II did not exist)

=== Autobiographical books ===
- Contribution to education in Macedonia. One autobiography of Kuzman Shapkarev, Macedonian review, Sofia 1927, vol 2
- "Materials for Revival of Bulgarian national spirit in Macedonia", Sofia 1984

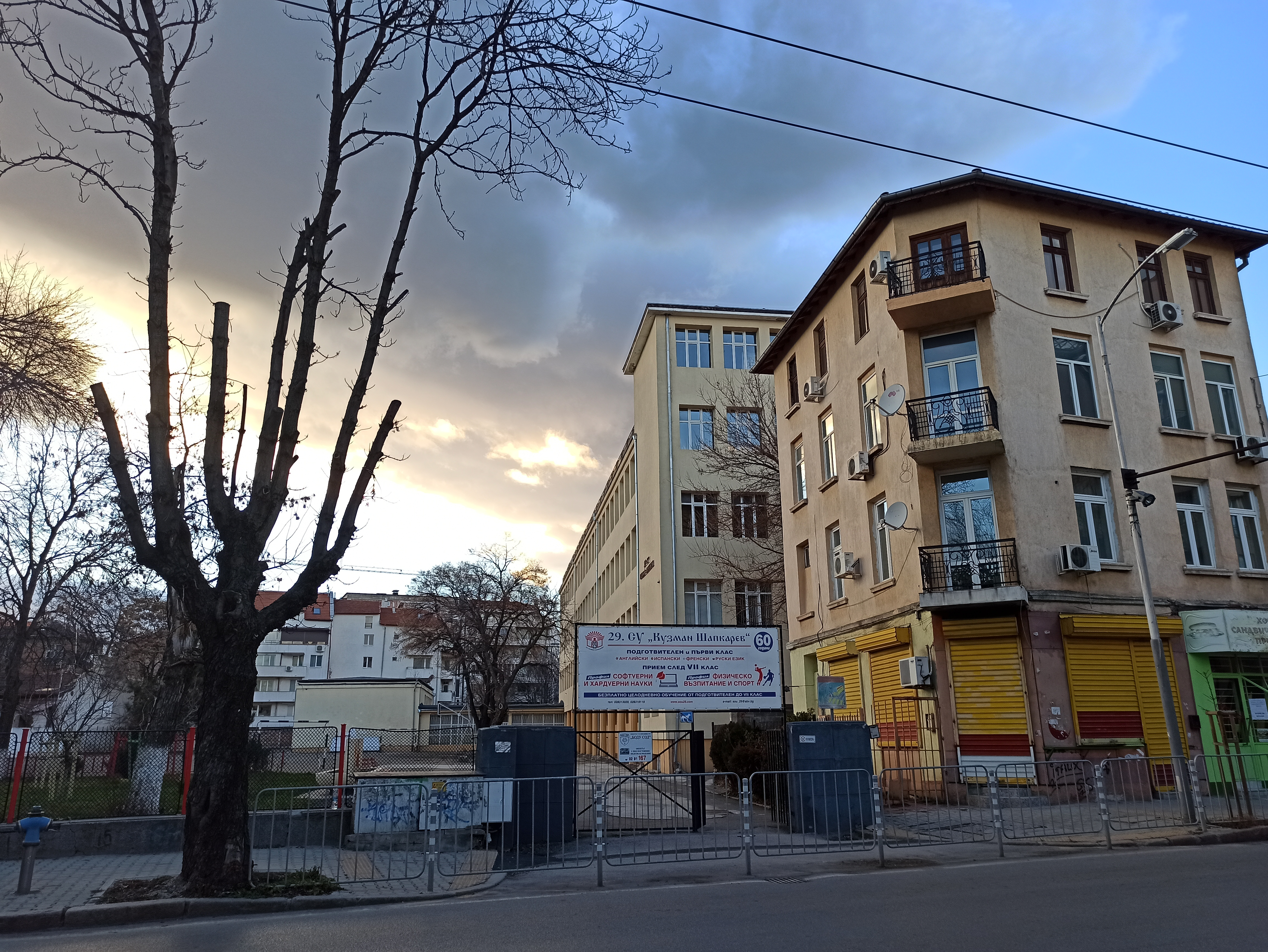
Kuzman Shapkarev Secondary School in Sofia.
