= Marin Drinov =

Bulgarian historian (1838–1906)

Marin Stoyanov Drinov
- Марин Стоянов Дринов
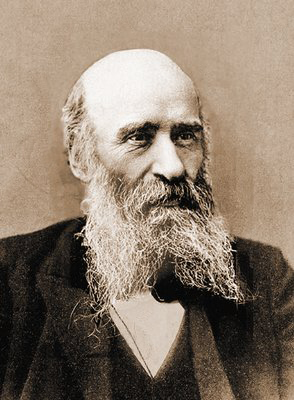
- Born: Марин Стоянов Дринов; 20 October 1838; Panagyurishte, Edirne Eyalet, Ottoman Empire
- Died: 13 March 1906 (aged 67); Kharkov, Kharkov Governorate, Russian Empire
- Resting place: Central Sofia Cemetery; 42°42′44.6″N 023°19′57.9″E
- Education: Imperial Moscow University (1865)
- Occupation: Historian

Marin Stoyanov Drinov (Bulgarian: Марин Стоянов Дринов, Russian: Марин Степанович Дринов; 20 October 1838 – 13 March 1906) was a Bulgarian historian and philologist from the National Revival period who lived and worked in Russia through most of his life. He was one of the originators of Bulgarian historiography. Drinov was a founding member of the Bulgarian Academy of Sciences (then the Bulgarian Literary Society), as well as its first chairman.

== Biography ==
Drinov was born in Panagyurishte in 1838. He left for Russia in 1858 to continue his education. He studied history and philology in Kiev and at the Moscow State University, traveled and worked in Austria and Italy between 1865 and 1871. In 1869, he became one of the co-founders and an active member of the Bulgarian Literary Society. Drinov achieved a master's degree and became a reader of Slavistics at Kharkiv University, beginning to work as a regular professor at the end of 1876. He is one of the members of the Kharkiv Linguistic School.

During the period of Russian government of Bulgaria (1878–1879) Drinov was Minister of Popular Enlightenment and Spiritual Affairs. Taking an active part in the organization of the newly liberated Bulgarian state, Marin Drinov is known as one of the authors of the Tarnovo Constitution, the person to have proposed Sofia instead of Tarnovo (favored by Austrian diplomats) for the new Bulgarian capital and the person to have introduced the standardized 32-letter edition of Cyrillic that was used in Bulgaria until the orthographic reform of 1945. He played a decisive role in the standardization of the Bulgarian language. As early as 1870 he rejected Shapkarev's proposal for a mixed eastern and western Bulgarian/Macedonian foundation of the standard language, stating in his article in the newspaper Makedoniya: "Such an artificial assembly of written language is something impossible, unattainable and never heard of." This position of Drinov has been criticized by some modern Bulgarian linguists as Blagoy Shklifov.

The orthography of the standard Bulgarian language, established with a decree of the Minister of Education Todor Ivanchov in 1899, is attributed to Drinov. The Bulgarian language has undergone three orthographic reforms since: in 1921, 1923 and 1945.

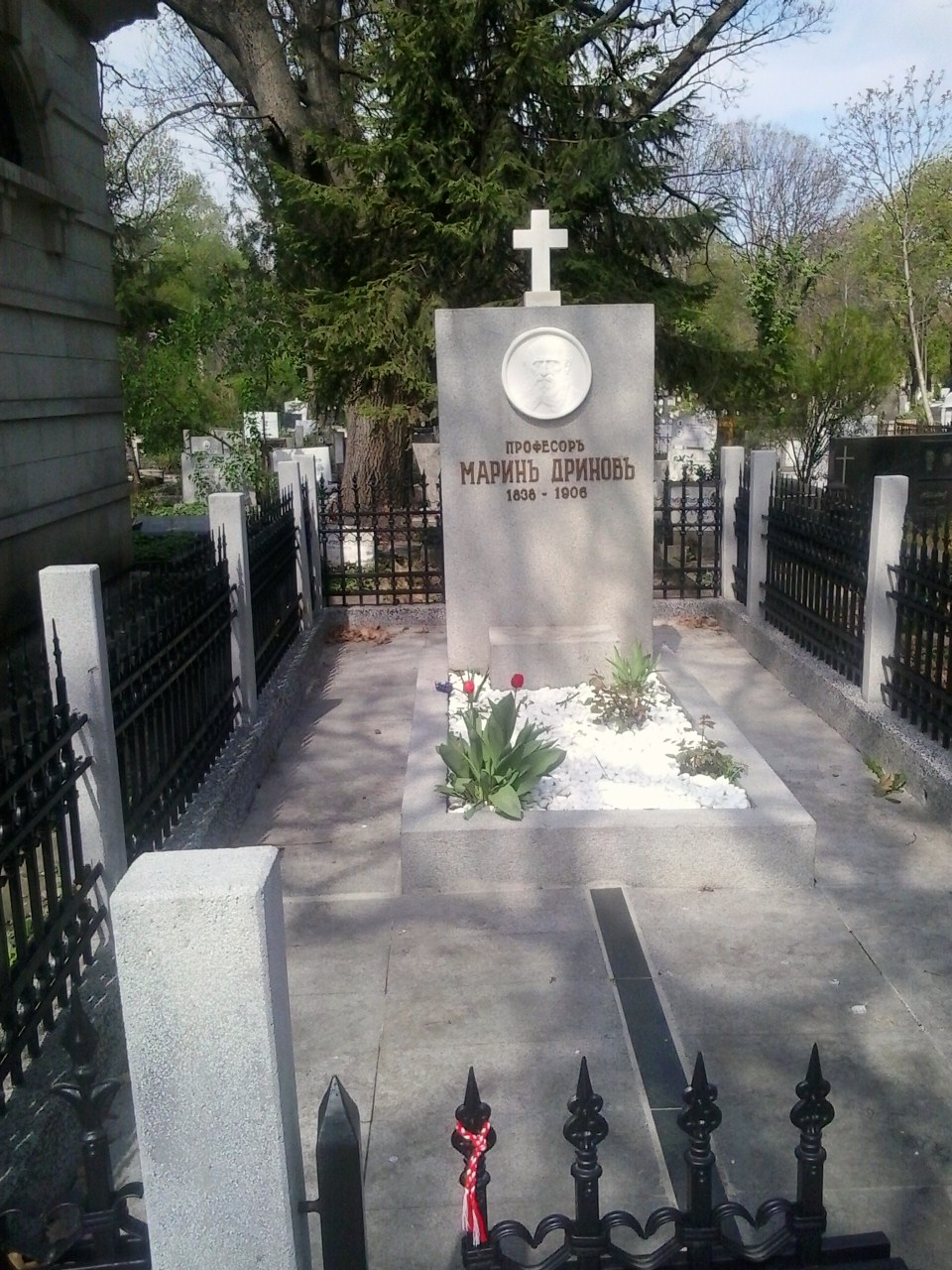
Marin Drinov's Grave in Sofia Central Cemetery (42°42′44.6″N 023°19′57.9″E)

Drinov lived in Kharkiv after 1881, continuing his scientific and educational activities until the end of his life. He died in the town on 13 March 1906, after a long fight with tuberculosis.

== Honours ==
Drinov Peak on Smith Island, South Shetland Islands is named after Marin Drinov.

Two awards of the Bulgarian Academy of Sciences are named after Marin Drinov.

== Literature ==
- Дринов, М. Поглед върху произхождението на българския народ и началото на българската история. Пловдив-Русчук-Велес, 1869
- Дринов, М. Исторически преглед на Българската църква от самото ѝ начало и до днес. Виена, 1869
- Заселение Балканскаго полуострова славянами (1872)
- Южные славяне и Византия в Х веке (1876)
- Дринов, М. Новый церковно-славянский памятник с упоминанием о славянских первоучителях. – Журнал Министерства Народного Просвящения, Ч. 238. Санкт-Петербург, 1885, 174–206 (отд. отп.)
- Дринов, М. О некоторых трудах Димитрия Хоматиана, как историческом материале. I. – Византийский временник, Т. I (1894), 319–340
- Дринов, М. О некоторых трудах Димитрия Хоматиана, как историческом материале. II. – Византийский временник, Т. II (1895), 1–23
- Дринов, М. Съчинения. Т. III. С., 1915
- Дринов, М. Избрани съчинения. Т. I-II. Под ред. на Иван Дуйчев, София, 1971

== Bibliography ==
- Imperial Moscow University: 1755–1917: encyclopedic dictionary. Moscow: Russian political encyclopedia (ROSSPEN). 2010. p. 223. ISBN 978-5-8243-1429-8 – via A. Andreev, D. Tsygankov.
- Сборниче за юбилея на професора Марин С. Дринов 1869-1899. Нареди и издаде Българското книжовно дружество в София. С., 1900
- Изследвания в чест на Марин Стоянов Дринов. София, 1960.
- Кирило-Методиевска енциклопедия. Т. I. София, 1985, 614–616.
- Gjuzelev, V. Marin Drinov (1838–1906) – Begründer der bulgarischen Slawistik und Mediävistik, Palaeobulgarica, XVII (1993), № 4, 107–126.

| Preceded by --- | Chairman of the Bulgarian Academy of Sciences; 1869–1882 | Succeeded by Vasil Stoyanov |
| Preceded by Vasil Stoyanov | Chairman of the Bulgarian Academy of Sciences; 1884–1894 | Succeeded by Kliment Turnovski |
