= Bulgarian alphabet =

Writing system of the Bulgarian language

Bulgarian Cyrillic alphabet Българска кирилска азбука
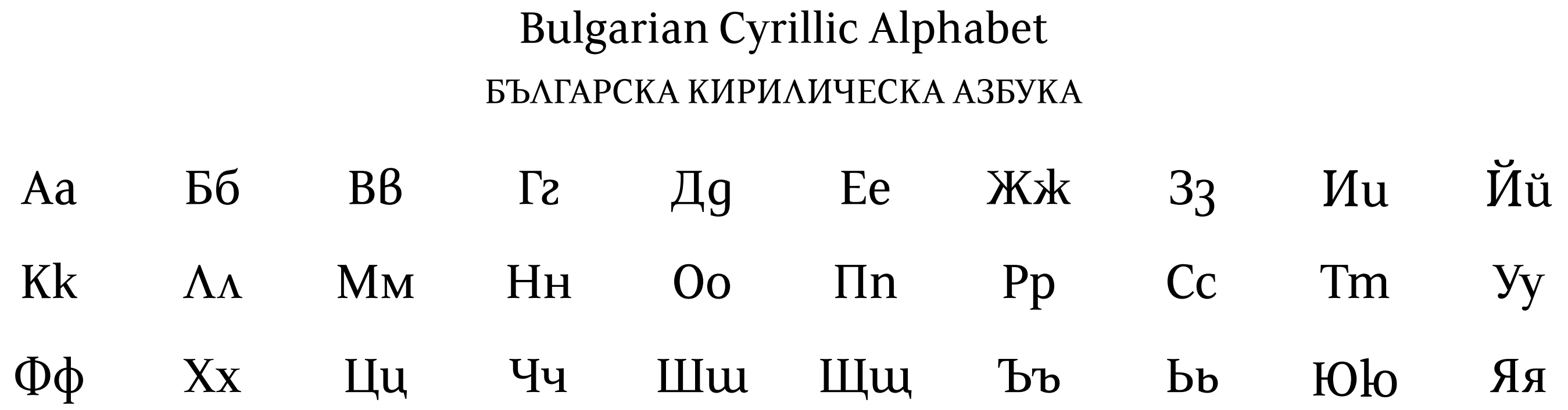
- Script type: Alphabet
- Period: 9th century – present
- Languages: Bulgarian

Related scripts
- Parent systems: Egyptian hieroglyphs: Phoenician alphabet; Greek alphabet (partly Glagolitic alphabet); Early Cyrillic alphabet; Bulgarian Cyrillic alphabet

ISO 15924
- ISO 15924: Cyrl (220), Cyrillic

Unicode
- Unicode alias: Cyrillic
- Unicode range: subset of Cyrillic (U+0400...U+04FF)

The Bulgarian Cyrillic alphabet (Bulgarian: Българска кирилска азбука, romanized: Balgarska kirilska azbuka) is used to write the Bulgarian language. The Cyrillic alphabet was originally developed in the First Bulgarian Empire during the 9th – 10th century AD at the Preslav Literary School.

It has been used in Bulgaria (with modifications and exclusion of certain archaic letters via spelling reforms) continuously since then, superseding the previously used Glagolitic alphabet, which was also invented and used there before the Cyrillic script overtook its use as a written script for the Bulgarian language. The Cyrillic alphabet was used in the then much bigger territory of Bulgaria (including most of today's Serbia), North Macedonia, Kosovo, Albania, Northern Greece (Macedonia region), Romania and Moldova, officially from 893. It was also transferred from Bulgaria and adopted by the East Slavic languages in Kievan Rus' and evolved into the Belarusian, Russian and Ukrainian alphabets and the alphabets of many other Slavic (and later non-Slavic) languages. Later, some Slavs modified it and added/excluded letters from it to better suit the needs of their own language varieties.

== History ==
In the 9th century, the Bulgarian Empire introduced the Glagolitic alphabet, devised by Saint Cyril and Saint Methodius. The Glagolitic alphabet was gradually superseded in later centuries by the Cyrillic script, developed around the Preslav Literary School, Bulgaria at the end of the 9th century.

Several Cyrillic alphabets with 28 to 44 letters were used in the early and middle 19th century during the efforts on the codification of Modern Bulgarian until an alphabet with 32 letters, proposed by Marin Drinov, gained prominence in the 1870s: it was used until the orthographic reform of 1945, when the letters yat (uppercase Ѣ, lowercase ѣ) and yus (uppercase Ѫ, lowercase ѫ) were removed from its alphabet, reducing the number of letters to 30. Yat was also known as "double e" (двойно е/е-двойно), and yus was also known as "big nasal sign" (голяма носовка), crossed yer (ъ кръстато), and "wide yer" (широко ъ).

Although Bulgarian uses the Cyrillic alphabet, some letter shapes in Bulgaria were made to look more 'Latin' in the 20th century (see the pictures on the right in the article).

With the accession of Bulgaria to the European Union on 1 January 2007, the Cyrillic script became the third official script of the European Union, following the Latin and Greek scripts.

== List ==
=== Overview ===
The Bulgarian Cyrillic alphabet (uppercase/lowercase)
А а	Б б	В в	Г г	Д д	Е е	Ж ж	З з	И и	Й й
К к	Л л	М м	Н н	О о	П п	Р р	С с	Т т	У у
Ф ф	Х х	Ц ц	Ч ч	Ш ш	Щ щ	Ъ ъ	Ь ь	Ю ю	Я я

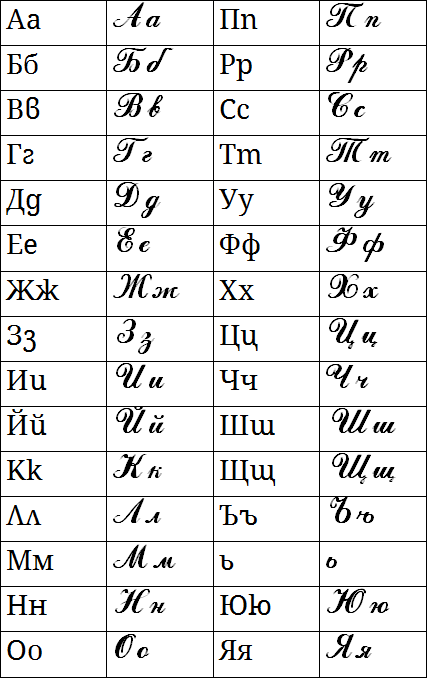
A modern form of the Bulgarian alphabet, derived from the cursive forms of the letters

Differences from other Cyrillic alphabets: alternate variants of lowercase Cyrillic letters: Б/б, Д/д, Г/г, И/и, П/п, Т/т, Ш/ш. Default Belarusian/Russian/Ukrainian forms on the left. Alternate Bulgarian (Western) upright forms in the middle. Alternate Serbian/Macedonian (Southern) italic forms on the right. See also:

=== Detailed table ===
The following table gives the letters of the Bulgarian alphabet, along with the IPA values for the sound of each letter. The listed transliteration in the Official transliteration column (known as the Streamlined System) is official in Bulgaria and is listed in the Official orthographic dictionary (2012). For other transliteration standards see Romanization of Bulgarian.

Bulgarian alphabet (Note: Lowercase cursive characters are shown in brackets when they look significantly different from their corresponding roman type. See Letterforms and typography of Cyrillic script for more information.)	ISO 9	Official transliteration	IPA (Note: See Help:IPA/Bulgarian for details.)	Name of letter	English equivalent
А а (а)	A a	A a	/a/, /ɐ/ or /ə/	а	a as in "part"
Б б	B b	B b	/b/ or /p/	бъ	b as in "bug"
В в (в)	V v	V v	/v/ or /f/	въ	v as in "vet"
Г г (г)	G g	G g	/ɡ/ or /k/	гъ	g as in "good"
Д д (ɡ/д) (Note: For д, both ɡ and д are used.)	D d	D d	/d/ or /t/	дъ	d as in "dog"
Е е	E e	E e	/ɛ/	е	e as in "best"
Ж ж	Ž ž	Zh zh	/ʒ/ or /ʃ/	жъ	s as in "treasure"
З з	Z z	Z z	/z/ or /s/	зъ	z as in "zoo"
И и (и)	I i	I i	/i/	и	i as in "machine"
Й й (й)	J j	Y y	/j/	и кратко	y as in "yes" or "yoyo"
К к	K k	K k	/k/ or /ɡ/	къ	k as in "kick"
Л л (л)	L l	L l	/l/ before е and и, /ʎ/ before ю, я and ь, /ɫ/ elsewhere	лъ	l as in "call" or "lend"
М м	M m	M m	/m/	мъ	m as in "man"
Н н	N n	N n	/n/	нъ	n as in "normal"
О о	O o	O o	/ɔ/, /o/	о	o as in "order"
П п (п)	P p	P p	/p/ or /b/	пъ	p as in "pet"
Р р	R r	R r	/r/	ръ	trilled r as in Spanish "perro"
С с	S s	S s	/s/ or /z/	съ	s as in "sound"
Т т (т)	T t	T t	/t/ or /d/	тъ	t as in "stick"
У у	U u	U u	/u/, /o/ or /ʊ/	у	оо as in "boot"
Ф ф	F f	F f	/f/ or /v/	фъ	f as in "food"
Х х	H h	H h	/x/	хъ	ch as in Scottish English loch
Ц ц (ц)	C c	Ts ts	/t͡s/	цъ	ts as in "fits"
Ч ч	Č č	Ch ch	/t͡ʃ/	чъ	ch as in "chip"
Ш ш (ш)	Š š	Sh sh	/ʃ/ or /ʒ/	шъ	sh as in "shot"
Щ щ (щ)	Št št (Note: The romanizations of these characters differ from the current version, ISO 9:1995, as it was never officially adopted as a Bulgarian standard.)	Sht sht	/ʃt/	щъ	sht as in "shtick"
Ъ ъ	Ǎ ǎ	A a	/ɤ/, /ɐ/ or /ə/	ер голям	u as in "turn"
Ь ь	ʹ	Y y	/j/ or not pronounced	ер малък	soft sign: y as in "canyon"
Ю ю	Ju ju	Yu yu	/ju/, /jo/, /ʲu/ or /ʲo/	ю	you as in "youth"
Я я	Ja ja	Ya ya	/ja/, /jɐ/, /ʲa/ or /ʲɐ/	я	ya as in "yarn"

Most letters in the Bulgarian alphabet stand for just one specific sound. Five letters stand for sounds written in English with two or more letters. These letters are ч (ch), ш (sh), щ (sht), ю (yu), and я (ya). Two additional sounds are written with two letters: these are дж (/dʒ/) and дз (/dz/). The letter ь marks the softening (palatalization) of any consonant (except ж, ч, and ш) before the letter о, while ю and я after consonants mark the palatalization of the preceding consonant in addition to representing the vowels /u/ and /a/.

The names of most letters are simple representations of their phonetic values, with consonants being followed by /ɤ/ – thus the alphabet goes: /a/ – /bɤ/ – /vɤ/, etc. However, the name of the letter Й is "i-kratko" (short i), the name of Ъ is "er-golyam" (large yer), and the name of Ь is "er-malak" (small yer). People often refer to Ъ simply as /ɤ/.

The Bulgarian alphabet features:

- The Bulgarian names for the consonants are [bɤ], [kɤ], [ɫɤ] etc. instead of [bɛ], [ka], [ɛl] etc.
- Е represents /ɛ/ and is called "е" [ɛ]. To transcribe a "ye" /jɛ/ phoneme in loanwords and foreign names, it is spelled as йе, as in йена (yen).
- The sounds /dʒ/ (/d͡ʒ/) and /dz/ (/d͡z/) are represented by дж and дз respectively.
- Short I (Й, й) represents /j/.
- Щ represents /ʃt/ (/ʃ͡t/) and is called "щъ" [ʃtɤ] ([ʃ͡tɤ]).
- Ъ represents the vowel /ɤ/, and is called "ер голям" [ˈɛr ɡoˈljam] ('big er'). In spelling however, Ъ is referred to as /ɤ/ where its official label "ер голям" (used only to refer to Ъ in the alphabet) may cause some confusion. The vowel Ъ /ɤ/ is sometimes approximated to the /ə/ (schwa) sound found in many languages for easier comprehension of its Bulgarian pronunciation for foreigners, but it is actually a back vowel, not a central vowel.
- Ь is used on rare occasions (only after a consonant [and] before the vowel "о"), such as in the words 'каньон' (canyon), 'шофьор' (driver), etc. It is called "ер малък" ('small er').

The grave accent is used to distinguish the pronoun ⟨ѝ⟩ 'her' from the conjunction ⟨и⟩ 'and'. Ѝ is not considered a separate letter but rather a special form of И.

== Writing ==
Bulgarian is usually described as having a phonemic orthography, meaning that words are spelt the way they are pronounced with the exception of allophones (i.e. phones in complementary distribution). Examples of these follow thusly:

- The sounds [ɐ] and [o], which appear only in unstressed syllables, are written with two different letters each – "а" or "ъ", and "о" or "у" respectively.
- The vowel in stressed verb endings -а, -ат, -я and -ят and the stressed short definite articles -a and -я is pronounced [ɤ]. Thus чета ("I read") is pronounced [t͡ʃeˈtɤ], and мъжа ("the man") is pronounced [mɐˈʒɤ].
- Voiced consonants are pronounced unvoiced when at the end of a word or when preceding an unvoiced consonant – e.g. втори ("second") is pronounced [ˈftɔri], and град ("city") is pronounced [ˈɡrat]. Similarly, unvoiced consonants are pronounced voiced when preceding a voiced consonant – e.g. сграда ("building") is [ˈzɡradɐ]. (The voiced consonant "в" is an exception – it does not cause the preceding unvoiced consonant to become voiced – сватба (wedding) is [ˈsvadbɐ].)

=== Modern developments ===
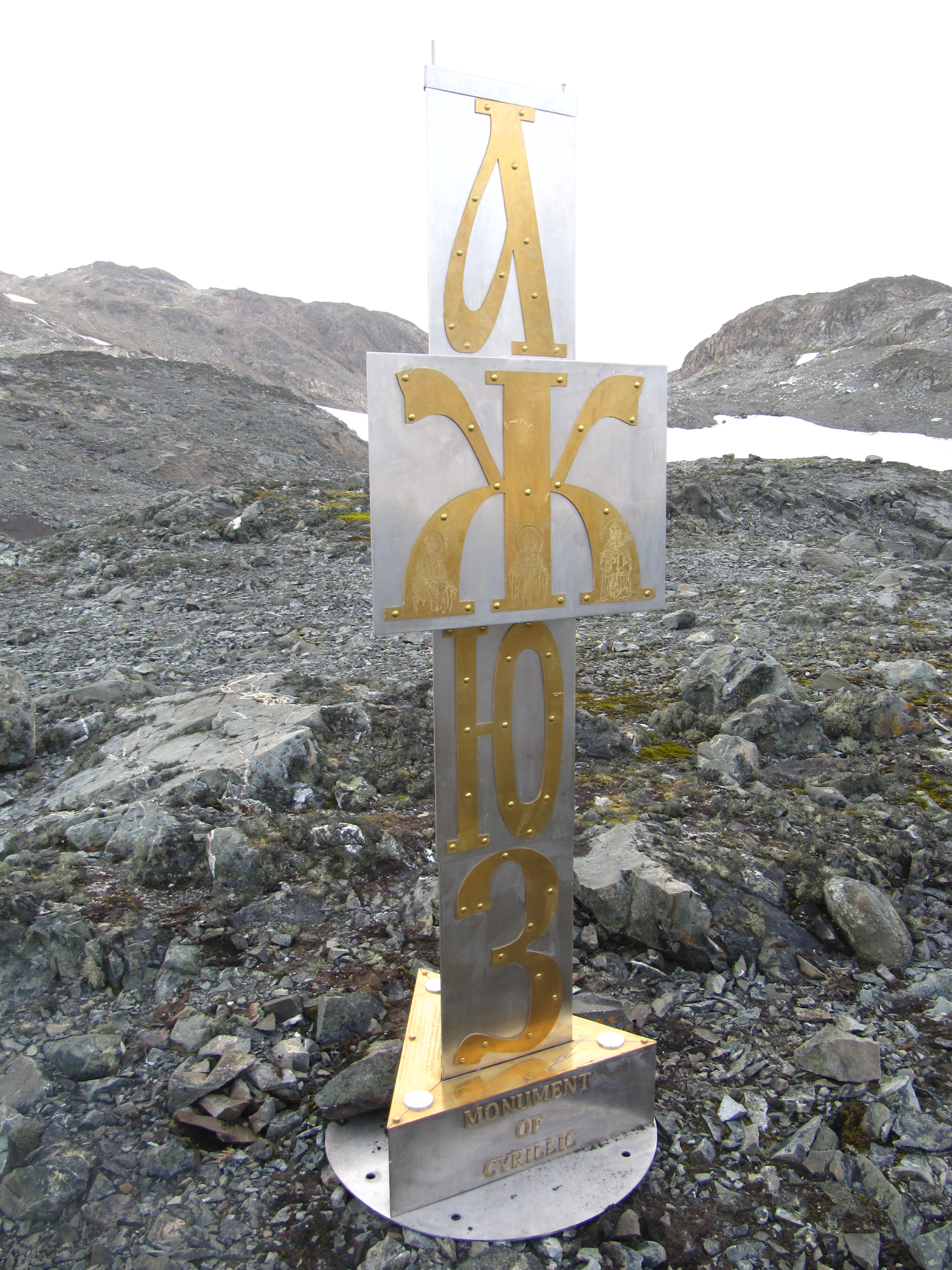
Cyrillic Script Monument at the Bulgarian base in Antarctica

Since the time of Bulgaria's liberation in the late 19th century, the Bulgarian language has taken on a large number of words from Western European languages. All of these are transcribed phonetically into Cyrillic, e.g.:

- French – e.g. тротоар (trottoir – sidewalk), тирбушон (tire-bouchon – corkscrew), партер (from par terre – ground floor)
- German – e.g. бинт (Bind – bandage), багер (Bagger – digger), бормашина (Bohrmaschine – drill)

Notable is the transliteration of many English names through German, e.g.:

- Washington → Вашингтон (Vashington) rather than Уошингтън, Scotland → Шотландия (Shotlandiya) rather than Скотландия

However, since the end of communism, this intermediary transcription in placenames, especially American placenames, has been incorrectly identified as being transliterated through Russian, and for that reason has been criticized as a holdover from the communist era, when Bulgarian press and news media were subservient to those of the Soviet Union.

In the years since the end of communism and the rise of technology, the tendency for borrowing has shifted mainly to English, where much computer-related terminology has entered and been inflected accordingly – again, in a wholly phonetic way. Examples include:

- кликвам на файла (click(klik)-vam na file(fayl)-a) – I click on the file
- даунлоудваш го на десктопа (download(daunloud)-vash go na desktop-a) – you download it onto the desktop
- чатим в нета (chat-im v net-a) – we chat on the net

The computer-related neologisms are often used interchangeably with traditional Bulgarian words, e.g. 'download' and 'upload' can be simply свалям and качвам (svalyam and kachvam – 'to bring down' and 'to put up').

=== Use of Roman script in Bulgarian ===
The insertion of English words directly into a Cyrillic Bulgarian sentence, while frowned upon, has been increasingly used in the media. This is done for several reasons, including –

- To shorten what would otherwise be a longer word or phrase –

Янките против още US войски в Афганистан (instead of американски - American)
The Yanks oppose more US troops in Afghanistan

- To avoid the need to transcribe to Cyrillic or translate to Bulgarian well known abbreviations:

Ние не сме видели края на SOPA, PIPA и ACTA (instead of, for example, СОПА, ПИПА и АКТА)
We have not seen the end of SOPA, PIPA and ACTA

Brand names are also often not transcribed: WikiLeaks, YouTube, Skype – as opposed to Уикиликс, Ю-Тюб, Скайп. However, this is not always the case, as in the headline "Фейсбук vs. Гугъл" (official transliteration: Feysbuk vs. Gugal). Note the inconsistency here – despite the insistence on Cyrillic, the "vs." has been retained in Roman script.

The 2012 Official Orthographic Dictionary of the Bulgarian Language by the Bulgarian Academy of Sciences permits widely known proper names to remain in their original alphabet. Example sentences are given, all containing names of American IT companies: Yahoo, Microsoft, YouTube, PayPal, Facebook.

== Keyboard layout ==
The standard Bulgarian keyboard layout for personal computers is as follows:

== See also ==
- Bulgarian Braille
- Cyrillic script in Unicode
- Macedonian alphabet
- Old Bulgarian
- Romanization of Belarusian
- Romanization of Greek
- Romanization of Macedonian
- Romanization of Russian
- Romanization of Ukrainian
- Scientific transliteration of Cyrillic
- Serbian Cyrillic alphabet
