= Miladinov brothers =

Bulgarian national revival poets and activists

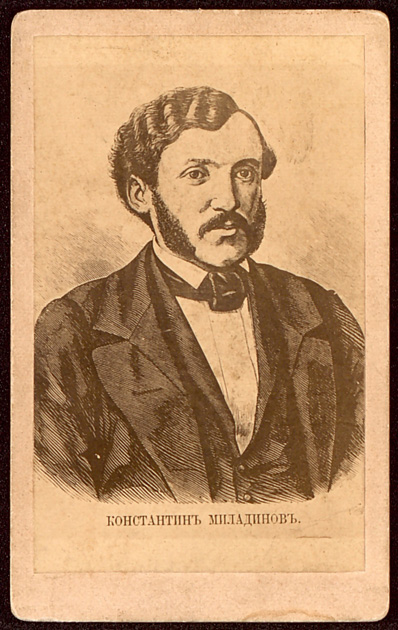
Konstantin Miladinov

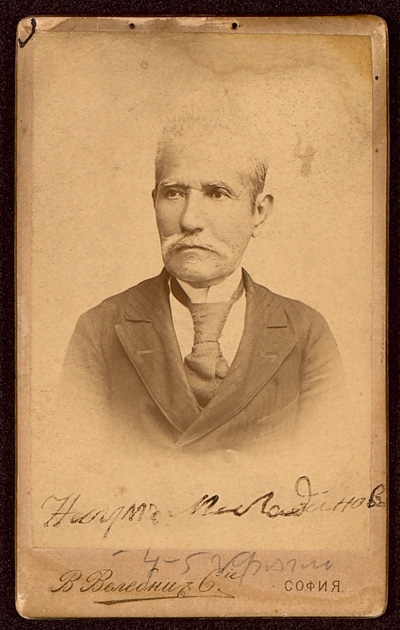
Naum Miladinov

The Miladinov brothers (Bulgarian: Братя Миладинови, romanized: Bratya Miladinovi, Macedonian: Браќа Миладиновци, romanized: Brakja Miladinovci), Dimitar Miladinov (Bulgarian: Димитър Миладинов; Macedonian: Димитар Миладинов; 1810–1862) and Konstantin Miladinov (Bulgarian and Macedonian: Константин Миладинов; 1830–1862), were Bulgarian poets, folklorists, educators, and activists of the Bulgarian national movement in Ottoman Macedonia. They are best known for their collection of folk songs called Bulgarian Folk Songs, considered a milestone in Bulgarian literature, the greatest literary work in the history of Bulgarian folklore studies and the genesis of folklore studies during the Bulgarian National Revival. They also contributed to Bulgarian ethnography through their collection of folk material. Their third brother Naum Miladinov (Bulgarian and Macedonian: Наум Миладинов; 1817–1897) helped compile this collection too. Konstantin Miladinov is also famous for his poem Taga za Yug (Grief for the South) which he wrote during his stay in Russia.

In North Macedonia, the Miladinov brothers are regarded as Macedonians, as part of the Macedonian national awakening and literary tradition. Their original works have been unavailable to the general public and only censored versions, and redacted copies of them have been published there.

== Family and background ==
The mother of the Miladinov brothers was Sultana Miladinova. Her father was an Aromanian from Magarevo who moved to Ohrid and studied in Moscopole with Daniel Moscopolites. Sultana's mother was a native of Ohrid and the granddaughter of sakellarios Pop Stefan, who was so fond of his pupil Dimitrius of Ioannou that he let him marry her. The brothers' father, Hristo Miladinov, was also from Magarevo. He was a pottery merchant, who moved to Struga in 1810. The family had eight children, six sons and two daughters.

After the conquest of the Balkans by the Ottoman Empire, the name Macedonia disappeared as a designation for several centuries. Names such as "Lower Moesia" and "Bulgaria" were used for the northern and central parts of the modern Macedonian region. The name was revived in the early 19th century with the new Greek state and was affirmed in the modern area as a result of Hellenic religious and school propaganda. Opposition to Hellenism and the Greek clergy became the main concern of the brothers. The Miladinov brothers deliberately avoided using the term Macedonia in reference to the region, arguing that it presents a threat to the Bulgarian people there, and proposed the name Western Bulgaria instead. Miladinov worried that the use of the designation Macedonian would imply an identification with the Greek nation.

== Dimitar Miladinov ==
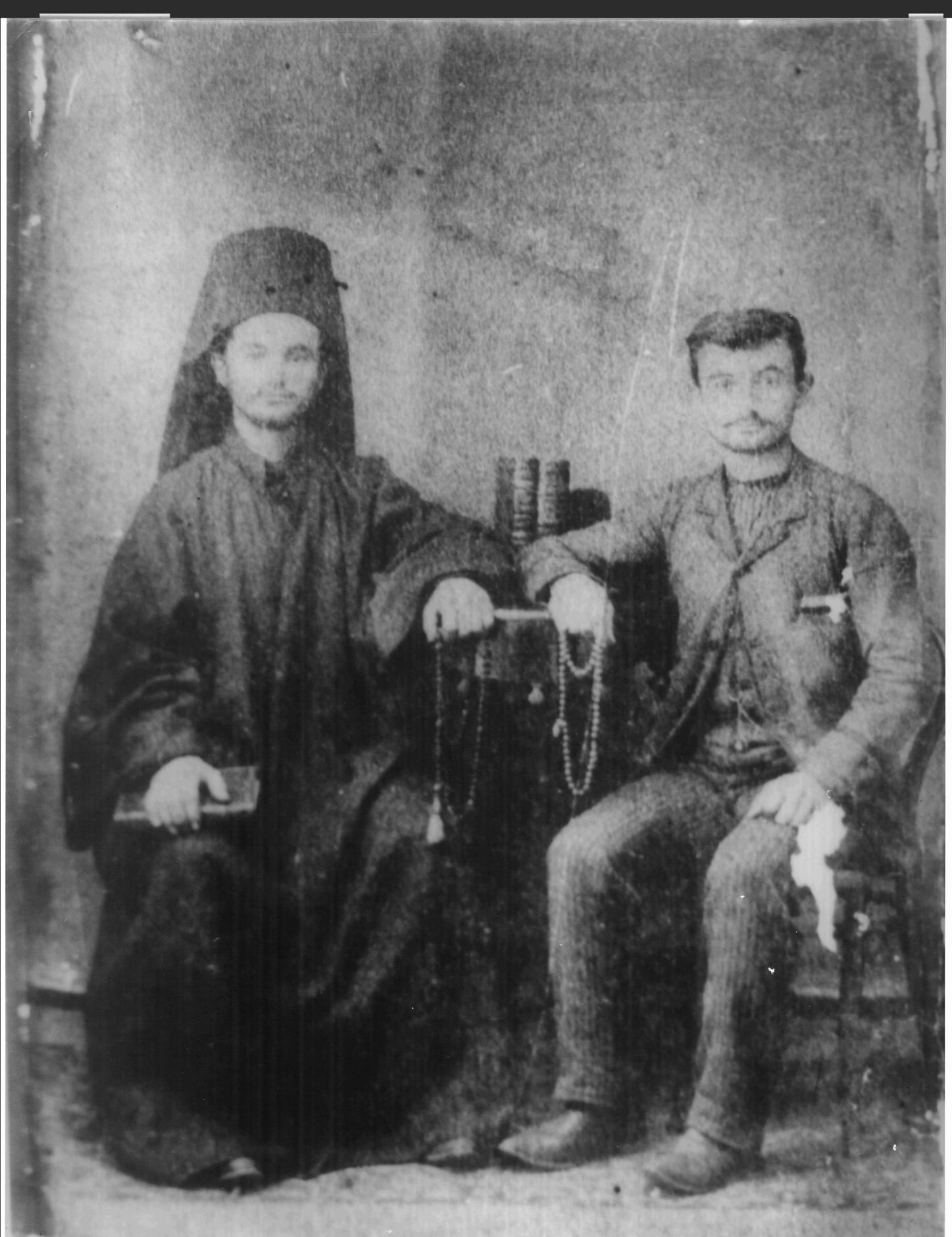
Dimitar Miladinov with Greek priest Meletius

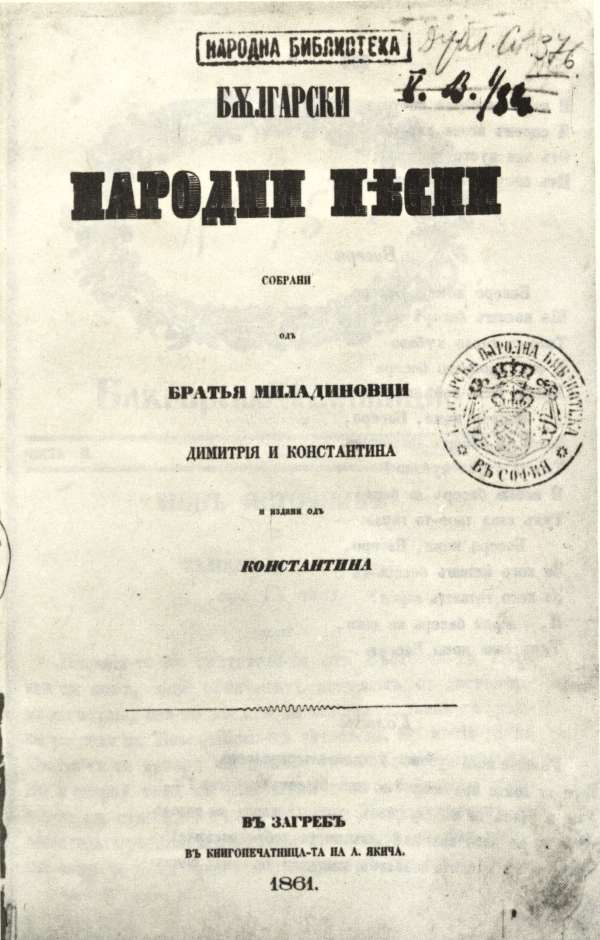
Front cover of the original edition of Bulgarian Folk Songs. "Bulgarian Folk Songs collected by the Miladinov brothers Dimitar and Konstantin and published by Konstantin in Zagreb at the printing house of A. Jakic, 1861"

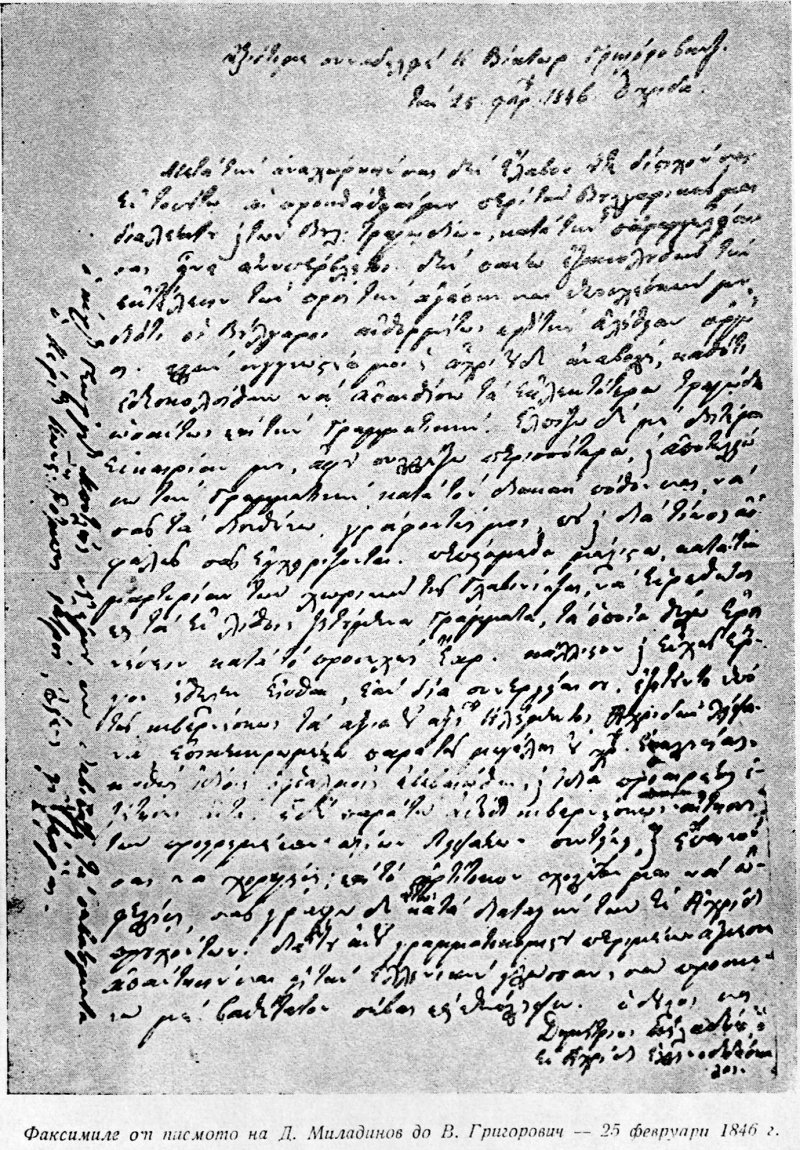
A letter from Dimitar Miladinov to Victor Grigorovich from 25 February 1846 about his search for Bulgarian folk songs and artefacts in Macedonia.

Dimitar Miladinov was born around 1810 in the town of Struga in the Ottoman Empire (today North Macedonia), in the family of a potter named Hristo Miladinov and his wife, Sultana. Dimitar was the eldest of eight children, six boys and two girls. In his youth, Dimitar received basic education at the Monastery of Saint Naum on Lake Ohrid. Afterwards, he continued his education in a school in the town of Ohrid. He studied in a Greek high school in Ioannina for three years, where he mastered the Greek language. Dimitar had worked as a teacher in Ohrid, Struga, Bitola, Prilep, Magarevo and Kukush, while also teaching in Greek.

As a teacher, in the 1840s, Dimitar introduced the Bell-Lancaster method in Kukush (today in Greece) and expanded the classes. A Greek bishop opposed his activities. In May 1845, the Russian Slavist Viktor Grigorovich, who sought to strengthen Russian influence by engaging local teachers and intellectuals, visited him in Ohrid and realised that Miladinov had improper knowledge of Bulgarian language, and was comfortable only in Greek. Russian interest in the Balkan Slavs was tied to efforts to expand influence in the region, and writings that encouraged national awakening in the Slavs were used to support these political aims. Under Grigorovich's influence, Miladinov developed interest in Bulgarian. As his interest grew, he developed a Bulgarian national consciousness. Dimitar travelled around the Macedonian region, collecting folk material, which he informed Grigorovich about. In a letter written in Greek on 20 August 1852, he complained that most of the Bulgarians of Macedonia used Greek as the language of education and were considered Greeks. He called for opposition to the hellenisation of the Bulgarians. From 1853 to 1856, he resided in Hapsburg South Slavic lands. In 1857, he received an invitation to return to teach in Kukush, on the condition that he would teach in Bulgarian, which he accepted. The inhabitants of Kukush liked him due to his charisma and teaching skills. At the initiative of Dimitar, and with the approval of the city's fathers, in 1858, the Greek language was banished from the churches and substituted with Church Slavonic. He also substituted Greek schoolbooks with Bulgarian schoolbooks from Istanbul. During this period, he translated the Acts of the Apostles into Bulgarian to make it available for church usage. In 1859, upon hearing that the town of Ohrid had officially demanded from the Ottoman government the restoration of the Bulgarian Patriarchate, Dimitar left Kukush and went to Ohrid to help. There, he translated Bible texts into Bulgarian. In a letter to Tsarigradski Vestnik (Tsarigrad Newspaper) on 26 March 1860, he wrote: "In the holy Ohrid district, there is not a single Greek family, except for three or four Vlachs now, and all the others are purely a Bulgarian tribe." From April to September 1860, he toured the Macedonian region to raise funds for the renovation of the Bulgarian church St. Stephen in Istanbul as a representative of the Bulgarian community. With the encouragement of Croatian bishop Josip Juraj Strossmayer, along with his younger brother Konstantin, he prepared a book titled Bulgarian Folk Songs, which was published in 1861. Due to his endeavours, the Greek bishop Meletius denounced Miladinov as a Russian agent. He was imprisoned in Istanbul in 1861. The Russian consul in Bitola, Mikhail Khitrovo, in a letter to Aleksey Lobanov-Rostovsky regarding the imprisonment, wrote: "...It would be very regrettable if there turned out to be no possibility of helping him, especially since one cannot deny that this man has suffered partly because of us". Khitrovo also requested support for Miladinov's family from the ambassador in Constantinople. Dimitar was later joined by his supporting brother Konstantin. On 11 January 1862, he died in prison from typhus.

== Konstantin Miladinov ==
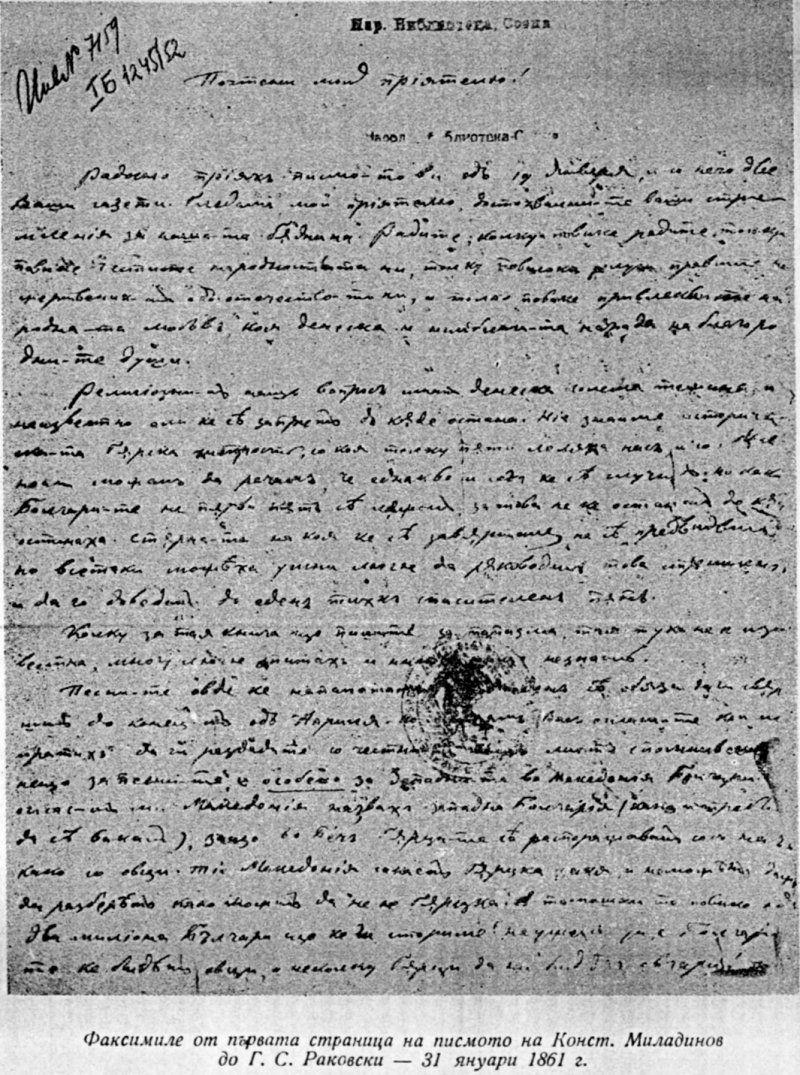
Letter from Konstantin Miladinov to Georgi Rakovski from 8 January 1861 to explain the use of the term Bulgarian in the title of the collection.

The first biography of the Miladinov brothers, written by their brother-in-law Kuzman Shapkarev and issued in Plovdiv, 1884.

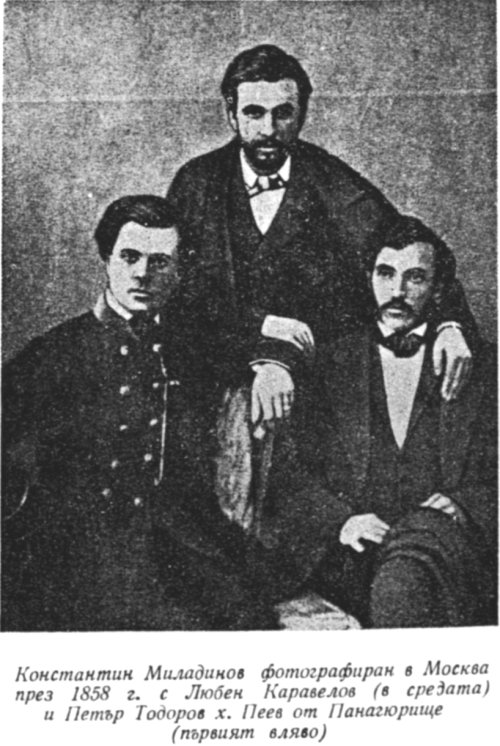
Konstantin Miladinov (right), together with the Bulgarian national activists Lyuben Karavelov and Petar Hadzhipeev in Moscow, 1858

Konstantin Miladinov was the youngest son in the family of the potter Hristo Miladinov. He was born in 1830 in Struga. He studied in an elementary school in Ohrid. After his graduation from the Hellenic Institute at Ioannina and the University of Athens, where he studied literature. He stayed at the Zograf Monastery along with Parteniy Zografski, where he learned Russian grammar. Afterward, he was a teacher in Magarevo in the schoolyear 1852/1853. At the initiative of his brother, Dimitar, in 1856, he went to Russia. He arrived in Odessa and because he was short of money, the Bulgarian Society in that city financed his trip to Moscow. Konstantin enrolled at the Moscow University to study Slavic philology. While at the University of Athens, he was exclusively exposed to the teachings and thinking of ancient and modern Greek scholars. In Moscow, he came in contact with prominent Slavic writers and intellectuals.

While in Moscow he desired to see the river Volga. At the time of his youth, the universal belief was that the Bulgars had camped on the banks of the river, had crossed it on their way to the Balkans and the origin of the name Bulgarians had come from the river's name. After seeing the river, he wrote his impressions down in a letter to a friend: "O, Volga, Volga! What memories you awake in me, how you drive me to bury myself in the past! High are your waters, Volga. I and my friend, also a Bulgarian, we dived and proudly told ourselves that, at this very moment, we received our true baptismal…" While staying in Russia, he wrote his poem called Taga za Yug (Grief for the South), expressing his homesickness. Other poems he wrote include "Bisera" (Pearl), "Zhelanie" (Desire), "Kletva" (An Oath), "Dumane" (A Saying), "Na chuzhdina" (Abroad). Along with fellow Bulgarian students, he created a literary association named Fraternal Labour.

He also helped his older brother Dimitar in editing the materials for the collection of Bulgarian songs, that Dimitar had collected in his field work. Konstantin had to transcribe the collected songs from the Greek alphabet in which they were recorded, into the Cyrillic alphabet. Initially, Konstantin tried to find assistance among Russian scholars to have the collection of folk songs published. After failing to find assistance, he went to Vienna to look for sponsors. The collection was subsequently published in Croatia with the support of the bishop Josip Juraj Strossmayer, who was one of the patrons of Slavonic literature at that time. In a private letter to Bulgarian National Revival activist Georgi Rakovski on 8 January 1861, Konstantin Miladinov expressed concern over the use of the name Macedonia as it could have been used to justify Greek claims to the region and the local Bulgarian population, so he suggested that the region should be called Western Bulgaria instead. Shortly after the publication of the collection, he found out that his brother was jailed. He went to Istanbul to help him. He was arrested on 5 August 1861, due to the Ecumenical Patriarchate's claim that he was a Russian agent. It is unknown if he was placed in the same cell as his brother or whether he saw him. He died on 7 January 1862 in prison from typhus.

== Naum Miladinov ==
Naum Miladinov was the brother of Dimitar and Konstantin. He was born in 1817 and finished primary school in Struga. Later he went to Duras, where he learned musical notation. After that, Naum graduated from the Ioannina Greek High School. From 1841 to 1844 he studied at the Halki seminary, where he graduated in music and grammar. In 1843 he wrote a music textbook and prepared a Greek grammar. After returning to Struga, Naum became involved in the activities of his brothers and became a proponent of the Bulgarian National Revival. He assisted in collecting materials for the collection Bulgarian Folk Songs. The folk songs collected by him are also notated. Naum also was a teacher in Ohrid and Struga. After 1878 he settled in the newly established Principality of Bulgaria. Naum received a national pension as a Bulgarian educator. He wrote a biography of his brothers, but failed to publish it. He died in 1897 in Sofia.

== Legacy ==
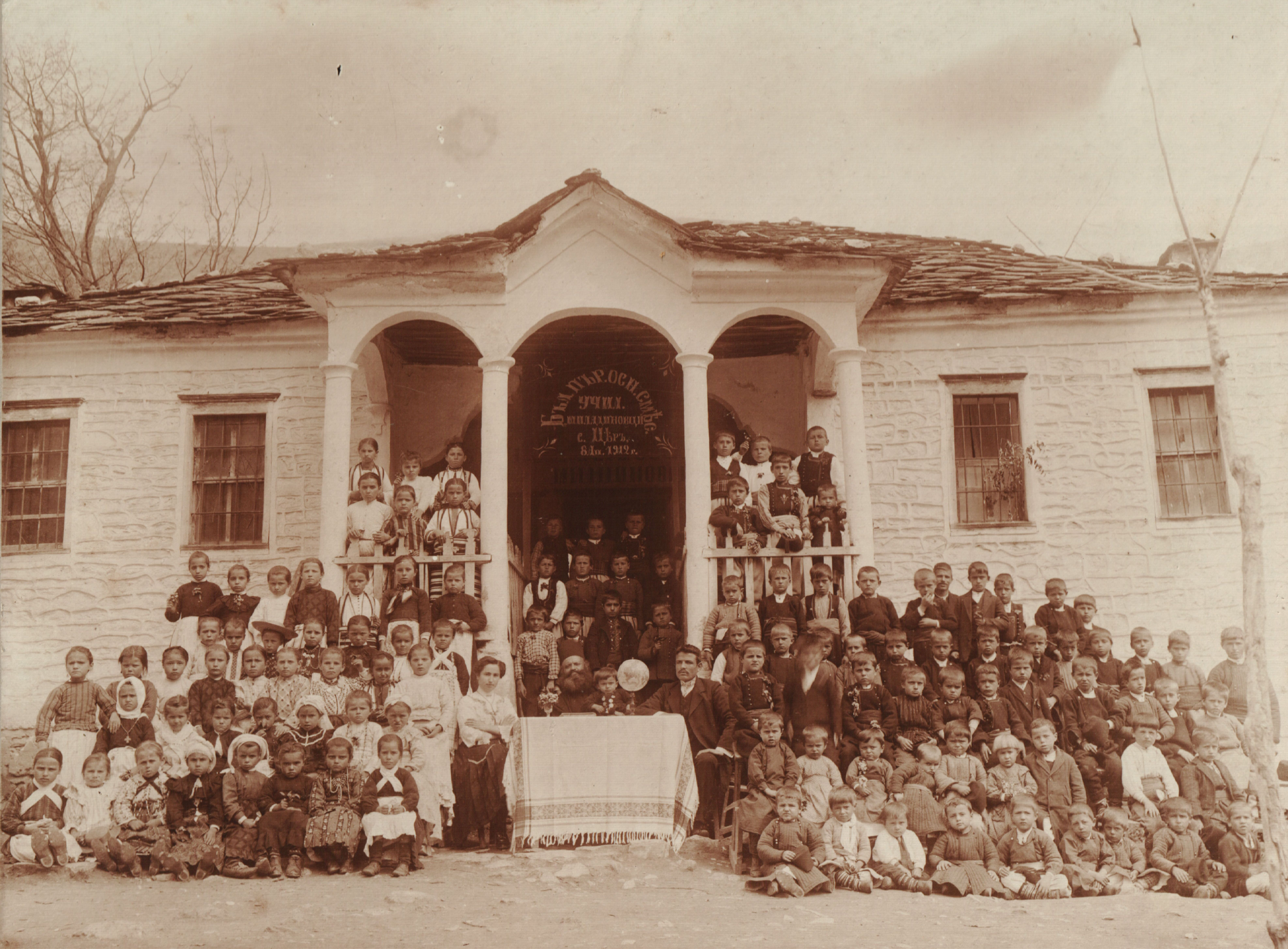
Bulgarian Primary School "Miladinov Brothers" in Cer, near Kičevo, then in the Ottoman Empire (1912).

The two brothers are honoured in the history of the Bulgarian National Revival in the 19th century. The collecting of the folk material was well-received by its contemporaries - Lyuben Karavelov, Nesho Bonchev, Ivan Bogorov, Kuzman Shapkarev, Rayko Zhinzifov and others. The Russian scholar Izmail Sreznevsky, in his opinion about the collection, pointed out in 1863: "It can be seen by the published collection that the Bulgarians are far from lagging behind other peoples in poetic abilities and even surpass them with the vitality of their poetry…" Parts of the collection were also translated into Czech, Russian and German. Elias Riggs, an American linguist in Constantinople, translated nine songs into English and sent them to the American Oriental Society in Princeton, New Jersey. In a letter from June 1862, Riggs wrote: "…The whole present an interesting picture of the traditions and fancies prevailing among the mass of the Bulgarian people." The collection also had an impact on the development of modern Bulgarian literature, because its songs inspired the Bulgarian poets – Ivan Vazov, Pencho Slaveikov, Kiril Hristov, Peyo Yavorov, etc. Dimitar's daughter Tsarevna Miladinova continued his Bulgarian nationalist efforts, co-founding the Bulgarian Girls' High School of Thessaloniki in 1882. Her son, Vladislav Aleksiev (1884-1962) was a prominent Bulgarian jurist and historian, a professor of Bulgarian medieval law, and a specialist in Byzantine law at the Sofia University.

In post-war Yugoslav Macedonia, the Miladinov brothers were appropriated by the historians as part of the Macedonian National Revival and their original works were hidden from the general public. The Macedonian national museum did not display their original works. Their works were claimed to be Macedonian, despite them stating in their works that they were Bulgarians. All traces of pro-Bulgarian sentiment were removed from their works during the Yugoslav communist era, but such manipulations were revealed in the post-communist era. Per political scientist Alexis Heraclides, the Miladinov brothers were among "the earliest pioneers of a sense of Macedonian identity, as least as conceived by contemporary Macedonian historians and other scholars". The official view in North Macedonia is that the Miladinov brothers were Macedonians who spoke Macedonian and contributed to Macedonian literature. Their ethnicity is disputed between North Macedonia and Bulgaria.

Monuments honouring the brothers are in Blagoevgrad and Pliska, Bulgaria, and Struga, North Macedonia. There are streets, schools and chitalishta named after them in Bulgaria. In North Macedonia there are also schools named after the Miladinov brothers, but the pupils there do not have the access to the works of their schools' patrons in original, while redacted copies of them have been available there, without the designation "Bulgarian" in them. Per academic Hugh Poulton, their original works have been more readily available in the post-communist era.

The Miladinov brothers' hometown of Struga hosts the international Struga Poetry Evenings festival in their honour, including a poetry award named after them. The Miladinovi Islets near Livingston Island in the South Shetland Islands, Antarctica, are named after the brothers.
