= Volos Declaration =

2022 theological statement

A Declaration on the "Russian World" Teaching, (Note: Arabic: إعلان عن مفهوم عقیدة الأرض الروسية; Bulgarian: Декларация против идеологията на Руския свят, romanized: Deklaraciya protiv ideologiyata na Rouskiya svyat; Georgian: დეკლარაცია რუსული სამყაროს სწავლების შესახებ; Greek: Διακήρυξη κατά της διδασκαλίας περί Ρωσικού Κόσμου; Romanian: O Declarație privind învățătura Lumii Ruse; Russian: Декларация об учении о Русском мире, romanized: Deklaratsiya ob uchenii o Russkom mire.) also known as the Volos Declaration, is a 2022 theological statement issued by the Volos Academy for Theological Studies and signed by more than 1600 theologians and clerics of the Eastern Orthodox Church in opposition to Russian Orthodox Church's teachings following the Russian invasion of Ukraine.

The statement, published on the Sunday of Orthodoxy, March 13, 2022, discusses and condemns as a heresy the ideology promoted by the Moscow Patriarchate since the end of the USSR and particularly since Vladimir Putin's rise to power, that of the "Russian world".

== Background ==
According to most researchers, the concept of the "Russian world" was introduced into modern scientific and political circulation in 1993–1997 by P. G. Shchedrovitsky and E. V. Ostrovsky. This ideology, mixing Orthodox theology, nationalism and a revanchist feeling vis-à-vis the old territories of the Russian Empire and the Soviet Union (USSR) developed mainly since the accession to power of Vladimir Putin. With the enthronement of Kirill (Gundyayev) as Patriarch of Moscow, the Russian Orthodox Church became a transmission belt for this idea in all sections of Russian society.

This ideology sees a transnational, civilizational Slavic unity based on references from the Kievan Rus', the unity of Orthodox Christianity, the use of the Russian language whose center would be Moscow, perceived as the Third Rome.

Since the end of the USSR, the Russian Orthodox Church has increasingly engaged in initiatives to establish its ecclesiastical authority on what it perceived to be its traditional preserve, while trying to spread its influence over the Orthodox world in general.

With the Russian invasion of Ukraine, the situation became increasingly untenable and tense within the Eastern Orthodox Church; about 1,600 theologians and clerics, including many Russians, participated in this document condemning the Russian moves within the Church and the "heresies" of the Russian Orthodox Church.

== Contents ==
The document consists of two parts, the first is an introductory note which condemns the "heresy" of the Russian World concept. The second part of the document gives scriptural background and quotes sacred tradition to argue that orthodoxy does not accept the "shameful" actions carried out by the Russian government and the Russian Orthodox Church under Patriarch Kirill's leadership.

They link this "heresy" with a certain type of ethno-phyletism.

Since the enthronement of Patriarch Kirill in 2009, the leading figures of the Moscow Patriarchate, as well as spokespersons of the Russian State, have continually drawn on these principles to thwart the theological basis of Orthodox unity. The principle of the ethnic organization of the Church was condemned at the Council of Constantinople in 1872. The false teaching of ethno-phyletism is the basis for "Russian world" ideology. If we hold such false principles as valid, then the Orthodox Church ceases to be the Church of the Gospel of Jesus Christ, the Apostles, the Nicene-Constantinopolitan Creed, the Ecumenical Councils, and the Fathers of the Church. Unity becomes intrinsically impossible.
Therefore, we reject the "Russian world" heresy and the shameful actions of the Government of Russia in unleashing war against Ukraine which flows from this vile and indefensible teaching with the connivance of the Russian Orthodox Church, as profoundly un-Orthodox, un-Christian and against humanity, which is called to be "justified… illumined… and washed in the Name of our Lord Jesus Christ and by the Spirit of God" (Baptismal Rite). Just as Russia has invaded Ukraine, so too the Moscow Patriarchate of Patriarch Kirill has invaded the Orthodox Church, for example in Africa, causing division and strife, with untold casualties not just to the body but to the soul, endangering the salvation of the faithful.

— Volos Declaration, A Declaration on the Russian World teaching

== Signatories ==
The document was signed by Eastern Orthodox theologians and clerics from Greece, Russia, Georgia, Romania, Ukraine, Bulgaria, France, Czech Republic, US, Lebanon, Germany, Belgium, from Canada, as well as some theologians from India and Serbia. A few hundred signatories are members of the Russian Orthodox Church, or from Russian Orthodox tradition, in particular theologians from Saint Vladimir's Seminary in New York City or the Lossky family in France.

== See also ==
- Religion and the Russian invasion of Ukraine
