= Moscow, Third Rome =

Theological and political concept

Double-headed eagle displayed on the 1497 seal of Ivan III Vasilyevich, who adopted the symbol and the idea of Moscow as the "Third Rome" through his marriage to Byzantine princess Sophia Palaiologina. It is the oldest known example of Muscovite state usage of the emblem.

"Moscow, the Third Rome" (Note: Russian: Москва — Третий Рим, romanized: Moskva — Tretiy Rim) refers to a theological and political concept that posits Moscow as the successor to Constantinople (and thereby Rome), which served as both the capital city of the Byzantine Empire and the global seat of the Eastern Orthodox Church. It first emerged in the late 15th and early 16th centuries—in light of the Ottoman conquest of Constantinople in 1453—receiving its classic formulation in the epistles of the Russian monk Philotheus of Pskov, who stated: "two Romes have fallen, the third stands, and a fourth there shall not be."

Originally eschatological in nature, it framed the Grand Prince of Moscow as the final sovereign protector of pure Orthodox Christianity before the Second Coming. During the 19th century, many Slavophiles and pan-Slavists transformed this pastoral idea into an imperialist ideology justifying state expansion and primacy over Orthodox Christendom. Most notably, this concept, which helped to sustain Russian imperialism during the Tsarist era, has been revived in national and religious discourse in Russia since the collapse of the Soviet Union in 1991, particularly alongside advocacy of the "Russian world" by the Putin regime and the Russian Orthodox Church.

== Concept ==
In medieval Orthodox theology, the Third Rome doctrine was primarily ecclesiological rather than political. The term "Rome" designated not a specific city or empire, but the universal Christian Church and the realm providing its temporal protection. Unlike the Western European concept of translatio imperii, which asserted the transfer of universal political sovereignty, the Muscovite doctrine operated as a translatio religionis, representing the providential transfer of the uncorrupted faith and Church following the fall of Rome to the schism and Constantinople to the Ottomans.

The eschatological premise that "there will be no fourth" Rome was rooted in the prophecy of the Four kingdoms of Daniel from the Book of Daniel (Daniel 2:44). Patristic and Byzantine exegesis identified the fourth and final world kingdom as Rome, which was prophesied to endure until the Second Coming and the Last Judgment. Because biblical tradition admitted no fifth monarchy, the Roman realm was viewed as the terminal epoch of human history. Muscovite churchmen concluded that if Moscow was the third and final earthly refuge of the Christian kingdom, no further successor could follow before the end of the world.

Under this doctrine, the Grand Prince of Moscow did not receive a mandate for territorial conquest, but the role of the katechon (the biblical "restrainer" from 2 Thessalonians 2:7 holding back the Antichrist). The sovereign's legitimacy depended on his preservation of Orthodox dogma, the defense of Church property, and the enforcement of justice. The formula was an eschatological warning rather than an imperial claim: if the ruler failed to maintain moral and spiritual purity within his realm, the final Christian kingdom would fall, precipitating the apocalypse.

== History ==
=== Slavic precursors ===
In the mid-14th century, the Second Bulgarian Empire promoted the idea of Tǎrnovo as a "New Tsargrad" (Constantinople). Following the fall of Tǎrnovo to the Ottoman Turks in 1393, Bulgarian clergymen sought refuge across the Rus' lands, bringing this imperial concept with them. Around 1453, the monk Foma similarly praised Boris of Tver as a "new Constantine" in his panegyric, The Eulogy of the Pious Grand Prince Boris Alexandrovich.

=== After the fall of Constantinople ===
Symbol of the Palaiologos dynasty, the last ruling dynasty of the Byzantine Empire

Within decades after the capture of Constantinople by Mehmed II on 29 May 1453, some Eastern Orthodox writers and clergymen began referring to Moscow as the "Third Rome" or "New Rome". The Ottoman Empire claimed to be the successor to the Roman Empire, but this was not widely recognised.

The fortress of Mangup, the capital of the Principality of Theodoro and the final Byzantine successor stronghold, fell to the Turks at the end of 1475. Even before 1453, the Slavic states in the Balkans had fallen under Ottoman rule. The loss of Constantinople caused widespread apocalyptic fears, with many viewing it as a sign of the end times (1492 marked the year 7000 Anno Mundi in the Byzantine calendar); others looked to the Holy Roman Empire or hoped for reconquest.

The loss of an Orthodox basileus left the Church without an imperial protector. Popular apocalyptic accounts, including tales on the fall of Tsargrad, circulated widely in Muscovy and prophesied that the Rus' would defeat the Muslims and establish an Orthodox ruler in the City of Seven Hills (Constantinople). The Grand Prince of Moscow was the most powerful remaining sovereign Orthodox ruler. Ivan III married Sophia Paleologue in 1472 and ended formal subordination to the Golden Horde in 1480, strengthening Moscow's prestige in the Orthodox world, though direct conflict with the Ottomans remained far beyond its capabilities.

=== Late 15th and early 16th centuries ===
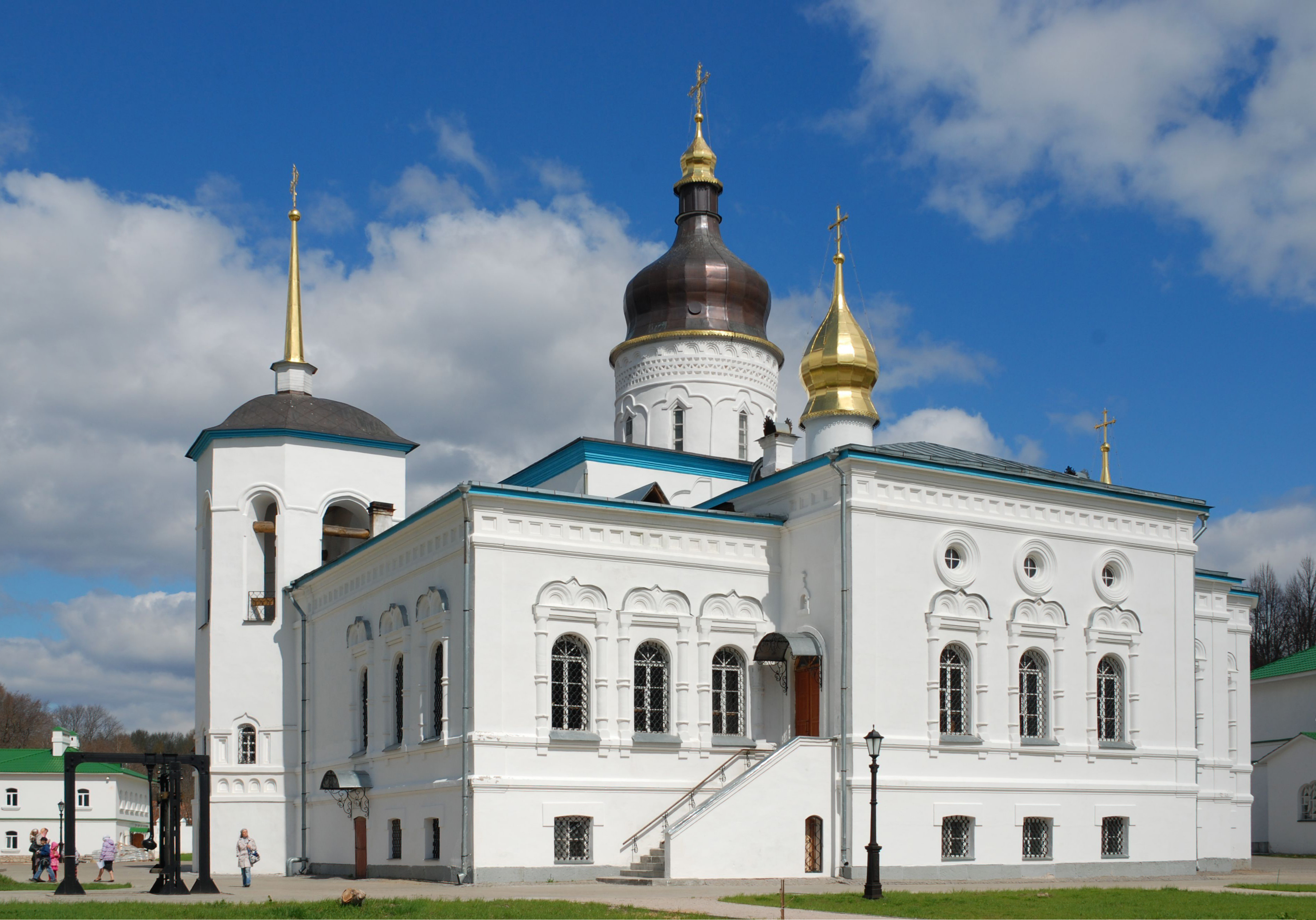
The Spaso-Yeleazar Monastery near Pskov, where Philotheus composed his epistles

Muscovite churchmen viewed the fall of Constantinople as divine retribution for the Byzantine acceptance of the Union of Florence (1439) with the Catholic Church. Even after the union was formally annulled at the Synod of Constantinople (1484), the Russian church refused to submit to an ecumenical patriarch operating under Ottoman rule. In 1492, Metropolitan Zosimus published a new paschalion (Russian: Изложение пасхалии), in which he praised Ivan III as "the new Tsar Constantine of the new city of Constantine, Moscow."

Ivan III increasingly adopted imperial ceremonial and the title tsar. Although his 1472 marriage to Sophia Paleologue linked the Rurikids to the Byzantine imperial dynasty, Roman traditions had never recognized automatic hereditary succession to the imperial office. Sophia's brother Andreas Palaiologos held titular rights to the Byzantine throne until bequeathing them to Ferdinand and Isabella of Spain in 1502. Muscovite legitimacy rested not on Roman dynastic law, but on religious continuity: as the last sovereign Orthodox realm, Moscow presented itself as the sole guardian of pure Christianity.

This independence from Constantinople was codified in the revised Muscovite episcopal oath of 1505–1511, which explicitly rejected consecration in Constantinople, describing it as ordination "in the area of godless Turks, by the pagan (Note: Used here in the medieval sense of "infidel" for the Muslim Ottoman authorities.) tsar." The concept received its definitive formulation during the reign of Vasily III, when the monk Philotheus of Pskov wrote his epistles defending the Orthodox faith:

Observe and take heed, pious tsar, for all Christian tsardoms have converged into thine own: two Romes have fallen, the third stands, and a fourth there shall not be; thy Christian tsardom shall not be left to others, according to the great Theologian. (Note: Original Church Slavonic: «Блюди и внемли, благочестивый царю, яко вся христианская царства снидошася в твое едино, яко два Рима падоша, а третий стоит, а четвертому не быти: уже твое христианское царство инем не останется, по великому Богослову...» The phrase echoes Daniel 2:44, though Philotheus cites John the Evangelist ("the great Theologian", traditional author of the Book of Revelation). Historians also dispute whether this epistle was addressed to Vasily III or the young Ivan IV.)

— Philotheus of Pskov, Epistle on the Sign of the Cross (c. 1523–1524)

=== 16th to 19th centuries ===
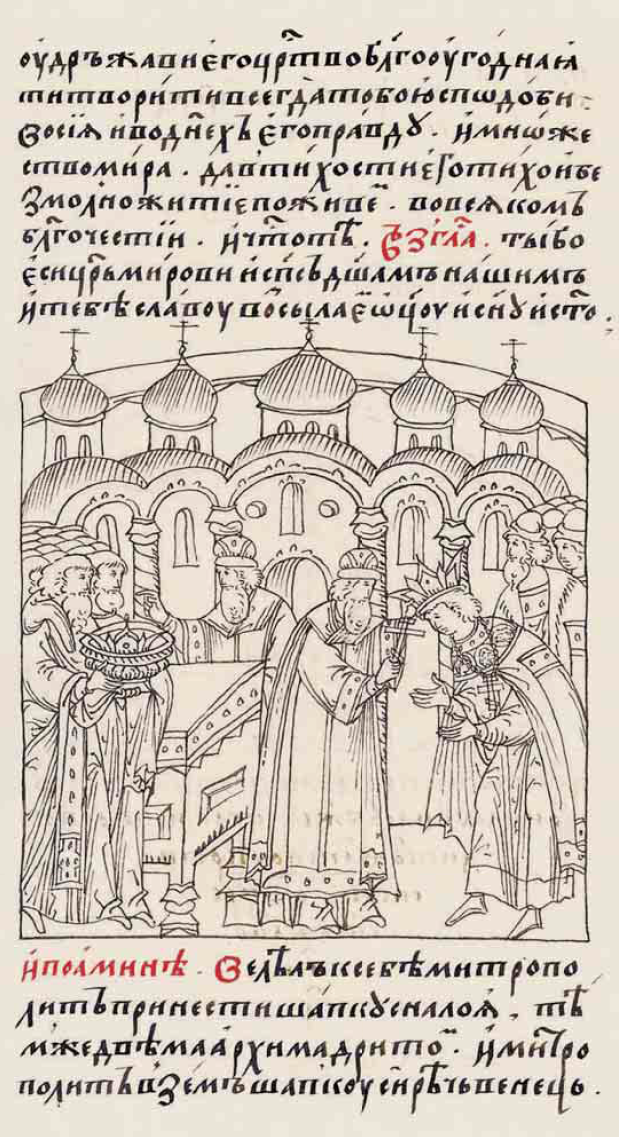
Coronation of Ivan IV in 1547, from the 16th-century Illustrated Chronicle of Ivan the Terrible

In 1547, Ivan IV was crowned the first Russian tsar, incorporating Byzantine liturgical rites and anointing into the ceremony. The imperial title received formal recognition in 1561 through a synodal decree of the Ecumenical Patriarchate of Constantinople.

When the Patriarchate of Moscow was established in 1589 during the visit of Patriarch Jeremias II of Constantinople, its founding charter (ulozhennaya gramota) officially incorporated the phrase, describing the Tsardom of Russia as the Third Rome. Despite this, official Russian court rhetoric throughout the 16th and 17th centuries more frequently invoked the biblical imagery of Moscow as the "New Jerusalem" rather than the Third Rome. During the 17th-century Raskol, the Old Believers revived the formula in its original eschatological sense, arguing that the liturgical reforms of Patriarch Nikon had corrupted the final Christian realm and heralded the Antichrist.

Under Peter the Great, the concept was sidelined by secular state reforms. Peter abolished the patriarchate in 1721, assumed the Latin title of emperor (imperator), and relocated the capital to Saint Petersburg, adopting Western European administrative models. In 1780, Catherine the Great formulated the "Greek Plan" with Holy Roman Emperor Joseph II, seeking to partition Ottoman territories and revive a Byzantine state under Russian influence, driven by Enlightenment-era geopolitics rather than Orthodox theology.

The idea was rediscovered in the mid-19th century by Slavophiles, who cast it as evidence of Russia's distinct spiritual character compared to Western Europe. Later in the century, Pan-Slavists converted the theological formula into a foreign policy rationale to support Russian intervention in the Eastern Question and the liberation of Orthodox Christians in the Balkans.

=== 20th century ===
During World War II, following the 1943 reconciliation with the Russian Orthodox Church under Joseph Stalin, from 1945 to 1948, Soviet officials sought to position the Moscow Patriarchate as an "Orthodox Vatican" capable of challenging both the Vatican and the pro-Western Ecumenical Patriarchate, an initiative that culminated in the 1948 Pan-Orthodox Conference in Moscow. The concept was part of Ivan IV's introductory monologue in the 1945 Soviet film Ivan the Terrible.

=== 21st century ===
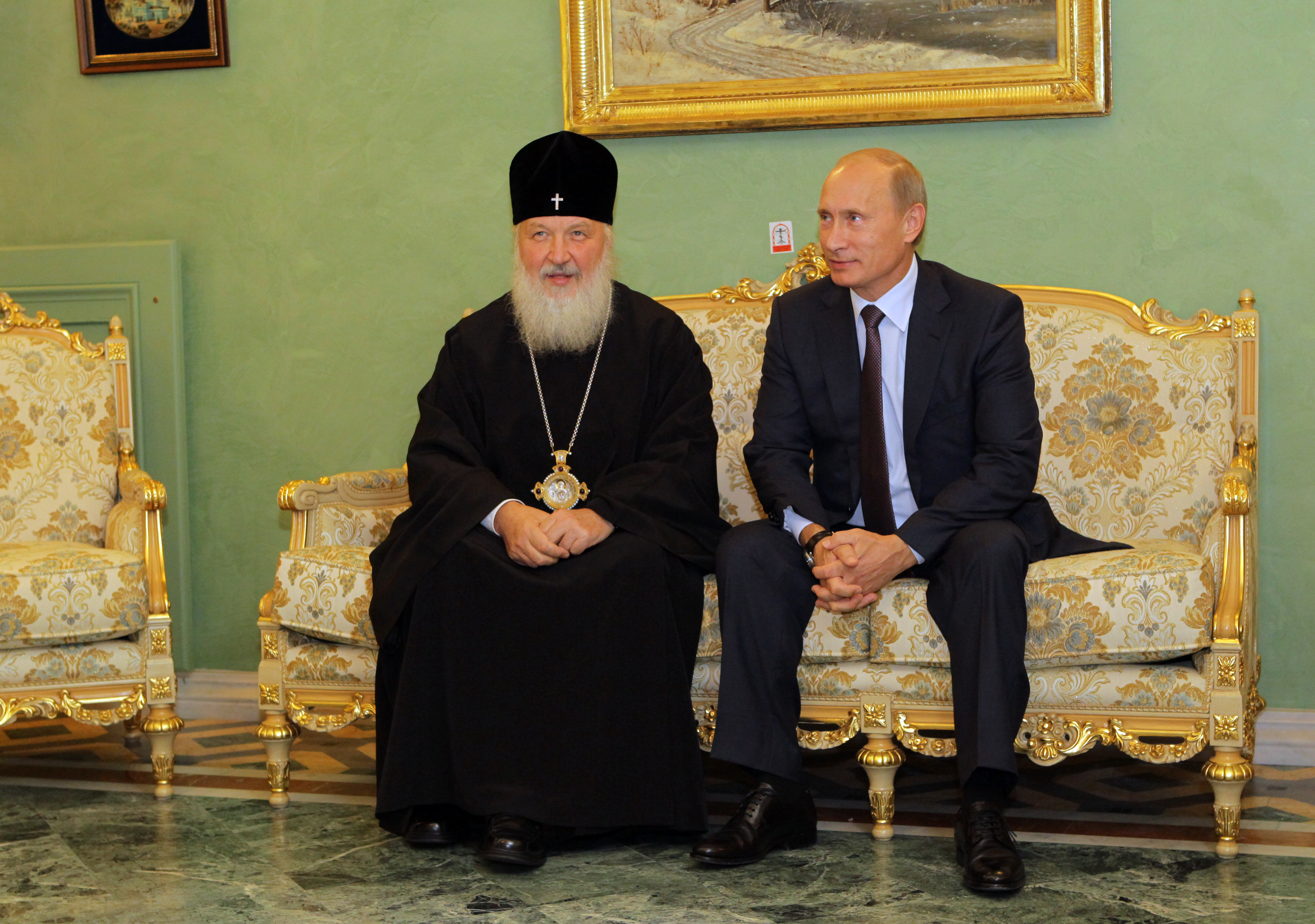
President Vladimir Putin and Patriarch Kirill in 2010

In the 21st century, the "Third Rome" concept re-emerged in Russian state and ecclesiastical discourse, converging with the idea of the Russian world (Russian: Русский мир, romanized: Russkiy mir). In a keynote address on 3 November 2009, Patriarch Kirill defined the "Russian world" as a transnational civilizational space anchored by Eastern Orthodoxy, Russian culture, the Russian language, and a shared historical memory centered on Moscow.

Under President Putin, the Kremlin and the Russian Orthodox Church have utilized this legacy to assert Russian civilizational distinctiveness, often framing the state as a katechon defending traditional moral values against Western secularism. Analysts note that this ideological framework has been employed to justify Russian political and cultural influence over neighboring post-Soviet states, particularly Ukraine and Belarus.

The invocation of this doctrine to justify the Russo-Ukrainian War led to profound fractures within the Eastern Orthodox Church. It contributed to the 2018 Moscow–Constantinople schism over Ukrainian church autocephaly. In March 2022, following the full-scale invasion of Ukraine, over 1,500 Orthodox theologians and clergy issued the Volos Declaration, condemning the Moscow Patriarchate's "Russian world" teaching as a form of ethno-nationalist heresy (phyletism).

== See also ==
- Constantinople Agreement
- Legacy of the Roman Empire
- New Rome
- Succession to the Byzantine Empire
- Tsargrad
