= Council of Constantinople (1872) =

1872 Eastern Orthodox Church council

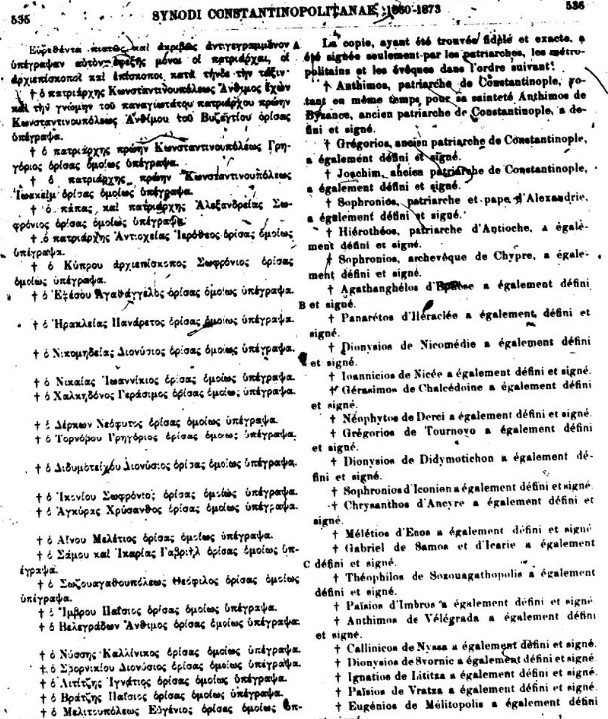
First page of the signatories of the Council in Greek and French.

The Council of Constantinople was a pan-Eastern Orthodox council held in Constantinople between 29 August 1872, and 16 September 1872, in response to the schism within a part of the Bulgarian ecclesiastical hierarchy. All the Eastern Orthodox patriarchs of the time participated in it. The council pronounced anathema on phyletism, which means the idea that ecclesiastical jurisdictions should be delineated not on territorial but national lines. The council also condemned racism.

The council is recognized as authoritative within the entire Eastern Orthodox Church.

== History ==
=== Background ===
==== General aspects and early troubles ====
During the 19th century, the Ottoman Empire faced challenges, notably with the independence of Greece. In 1856, the Ottoman Empire attempted reforms in its governance system. During the Tanzimat period, the Ottoman Sultan officially assigned the Ecumenical Patriarch of Constantinople the role of representing the Rum Millet. This sparked a crisis within the Ecumenical Patriarchate, as dissenters opposing the Ottoman Empire and the state of affairs within the Rum Millet could now consider the patriarch and the patriarchy directly responsible since he became their official representative.

In particular, Bulgarian nationalists strongly opposed the situation within the patriarchy, where the vast majority of bishoprics were held by Greeks, especially in Bulgaria. They were also in conflict with the Greeks over financial matters concerning the payment of debts to the Ottoman Sultan. Between 1858 and 1860, the Greek National Assembly convened to address some of the contentious issues related to the Rum Millet, but these efforts did not yield results.

==== Conflict and schism ====
After having his demands rejected, Metropolitan Hilarion of Makariopolis decided to enter into schism; he ceased commemorating the Patriarch of Constantinople during the Easter celebration in 1860. Up until this point, he had been the bishop appointed by the patriarchate in one of its Bulgarian-language parishes in Constantinople. He presented himself as the 'leader of a de facto-created Bulgarian church' and was swiftly deposed by Patriarch Joachim II. Two of the Bulgarian bishops who followed him were also deposed, namely Paissy of Plovdiv and Auxentius of Durrës.

Between 1860 and 1866, numerous negotiations were initiated between the two parties, but they led to no resolution. Furthermore, the arrival of the new Russian ambassador, Ignatiev, further complicated the matter. This move toward independence was also supported by the Grand vizier of the Ottoman Empire, Mehmed Emin Ali Pasha.

In reality, the intervention of external political actors displeased the Patriarchate of Constantinople, which would have preferred the issue to be resolved within an Orthodox framework. The patriarch contemplated convening an ecumenical council to address the Bulgarian question. In 1868, Ali Pasha encouraged Bulgarian bishops to secede from the patriarchate; three of them joined the already deposed bishops, and other bishops who had joined the schismatic Bulgarian Church in the meantime.

In 1872, the Holy Synod of the patriarchate decided to make one final attempt to resolve the crisis by proposing the creation of a Bulgarian exarchate. However, the proposal included political autonomy for the Bulgarians, which displeased the Ottoman Empire, leading to the prohibition of the proposition. The rebellious Bulgarian bishops then decided to elect their own exarch, Anthim I.

=== Council ===
To address this situation, Anthimus VI of Constantinople decided to convene a council involving the other Orthodox patriarchates. The council took place in the Saint George Cathedral of Constantinople between 29 August 1872, and 16 September 1872. In addition to the patriarchs of Alexandria, Antioch, and Jerusalem, the Archbishop of Cyprus attended, and the council was joined by twenty-five metropolitans and bishops, including two former patriarchs of Constantinople. The position opposing the Bulgarian Church and phyletism quickly gained the majority of bishops and participants. However, Patriarch Cyril II of Jerusalem fled at the end of the first session, as he did not wish to conflict with Russian interests, among other reasons, given his extensive lands in the Russian Empire.

After deliberations, the council chose to condemn the Bulgarian schism completely. According to the council, the rebellious bishops adhered to a new heresy within the Orthodox Church, phyletism, meaning nationalism applied within the Orthodox Church. In particular, the council was greatly troubled by the fact that the schismatic bishops had attempted to create parallel ecclesiastical hierarchies exclusively for Bulgarians, while Orthodox bishops were already present in those areas, such as Constantinople. The council saw this as a violation of Orthodox canonical law and an ecclesiological heresy. The general idea of phyletism is that ecclesiastical jurisdictions should be based not on territorial but on national lines. In its proclamation of faith (oros), the council declared:

[So,] The ethnic egoism that will develop in each of the "national" Churches will stifle religious sentiments to such an extent that it will hardly be permitted for one of these Churches to watch over and cooperate with the other as Christian duty requires. [...] and the dogma of the Church being "one, holy, catholic, and apostolic" receives a mortal blow. [...]
We repress, blame, and condemn phyletism, i.e., distinctions of races, disputes, emulation, and national divisions within the Church of Jesus Christ, as opposed to the doctrine of the Gospel and the sacred canons of our blessed fathers who support the Holy Church and maintain in good order the Christian community they guide on the path of divine piety. II. We declare, in agreement with the sacred canons, those who admit this phyletism and dare to establish new phyletic assemblies based on this principle as real schismatics, alien to the one, holy, catholic, and apostolic Church. Therefore, we declare schismatic and alien to the Orthodox Church of Christ all those who have separated themselves from the Orthodox Church, who have set up a separate altar, and who have formed a phyletic assembly; i.e., [the prelates whose names follow].

The council considered phyletism and racism as "racial aggregations", "new glories", and "modern corruptions". Racism was thus also targeted and condemned by the council.

=== Consequences ===
Although the schism persisted, after this council, the position of the rebellious bishops and their Church became complicated. Despite achieving independence, they remained separated from the other Orthodox Churches for 70 years. In 1945, an agreement was reached between the Patriarchate of Constantinople and the Bulgarian Exarchate to resolve the issue and reintegrate the Bulgarians into the Eastern Orthodox Church.

== Legacy ==
The council is recognized as authoritative within the entire Eastern Orthodox Church.

However, despite this recognition many Eastern Orthodox Churches developed attitudes that could be characterized as phyletist in the 20th century, particularly the Russian Orthodox Church and the Georgian Orthodox Church, but not exclusively. The council was used within the Eastern Orthodox Church in the context of controversies related to the ideology of the Russian world, as seen in the Volos Declaration or during the Pan-Orthodox Council.

Phyletism is generally considered to have increased throughout the 20th century despite the condemnation by the council, especially in the ecclesiastical management of Eastern Orthodox communities in the diaspora.
