= Latin civilisation =

Latin civilisation may refer to:

- Latins (Italic tribe)
- Ancient Rome
- Roman Empire
  - The Legacy of the Roman Empire
- Latin America
- Western culture, which was influenced by the Roman Empire
- The sphere of influence of the Roman Catholic Church
