= Yelizarov Convent =

Coordinates: 58°02′56″N 28°11′40″E

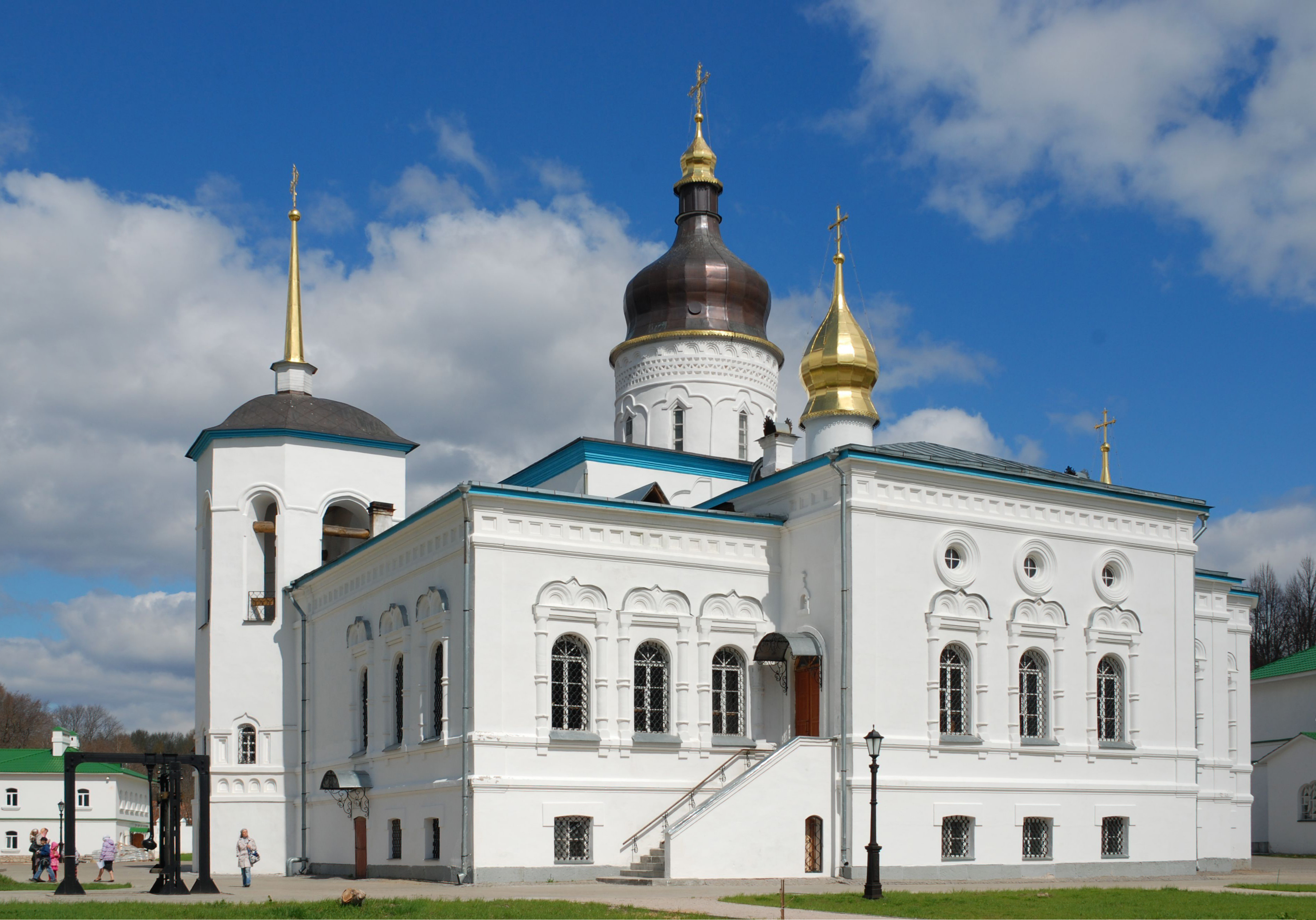
The katholikon dates from 1574. It is dedicated to the feast of the Three Holy Hierarchs.

Yelizarov or Yeleazarov Convent (Russian: Спасо-Елеазаровский монастырь) is a small convent founded as a monastery in 1447 to the north of Pskov, along the road leading to Gdov, by a local peasant named Eleazar. He constructed the wooden church of Three Holy Fathers, wherein he was interred upon his death on 15 May 1481. Eleazar was canonized at the Stoglavy Sobor in 1551.

In the mid-16th century, the monastery was heavily fortified and attained a position of great importance and celebrity, owing to its learned hegumen, Philotheus of Pskov, who is credited with authorship of the Legend of the White Cowl and the Third Rome prophecy. It was during his hegumenship that the monastery became known for its school of icon-painters and its still-standing cathedral was built. Some scholars believe that the only known copy of the Lay of Igor's Campaign was created by one of local monks at the behest of Philotheus.

After seven decades of Soviet neglect, the monastery was revived as a nunnery patronized by Lyudmila Putina and Lyubov Sliska who commissioned a luxurious guest house for their prolonged stays at the convent. The convent's mother superior supposedly had a portrait of Vladimir Putin hanging in her bed-chamber. Both Putina and Sliska attended her funeral in Moscow in 2010.
