= Russian world =

Conceptual sphere of influence of Russia

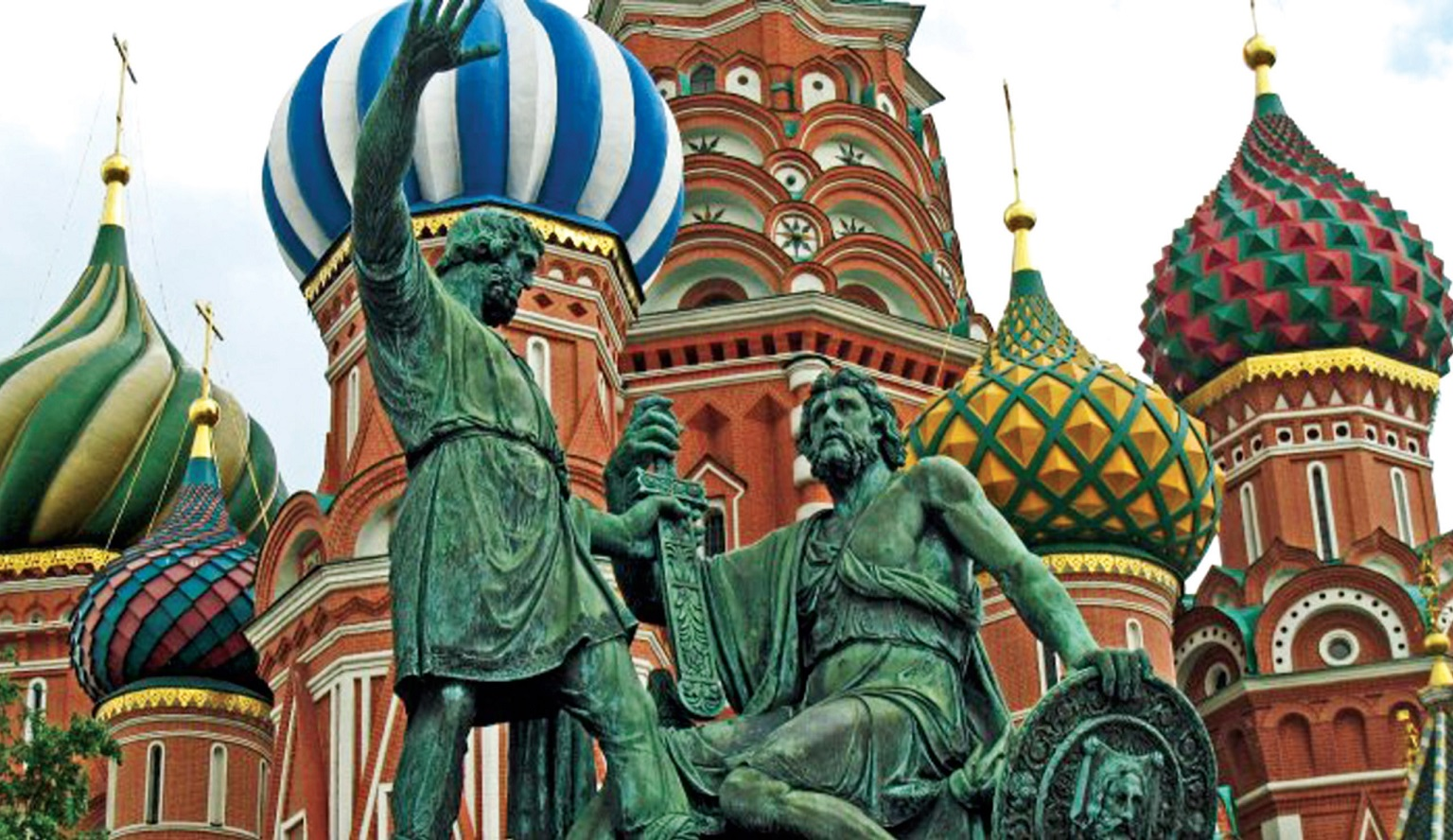
Image on the cover of the book Russian World by O. Kuzmina (CGI, 2015). It depicts Saint Basil's Cathedral of Moscow behind the monument to Minin and Pozharsky.

The "Russian world" (Russian: русский мир, romanized: rússkiy mir) is a concept and a political doctrine usually defined as the sphere of military, political and cultural influence of Russia. It is a vague term, mostly used to refer to communities with a historical, cultural, or spiritual tie to Russia. This can include all ethnic Russians and Russian speakers in neighboring states, as well as those who belong to the Russian Orthodox Church. The concept of the "Russian world" is linked to Russian neo-imperialism. President Vladimir Putin established the government-funded Russkiy Mir Foundation to foster the idea of the "Russian world" abroad. The concept is sometimes also called the Pax Russica, as a counterweight to the Pax Americana after WWII.

== History ==
Philologist Andrey Desnitsky analyzed the National Corpus of the Russian Language and established that the expression "Russian world" was used only sporadically before 1830s. Later the term started being used more frequently, as he wrote, "They seem to be characteristic of the romantic European nationalisms of that period when people within the same nation state (or longing for such a state, as was the case in Germany) started to look for a common identity based on ethnicity and culture. Similar concepts can be found in other languages, like Deutschtum in German or Hispanidad in Spanish. Still later, up until World War I the term became a commonplace, mostly used as an apposition to other nations, "usually without any jingoism". After the Russian Revolution the expression became nearly obsolete, only to resurface in Kremlin propaganda since the early 21st century.

== Concept ==
A map of the Russian world, in this version including Russia, Belarus, southern and eastern parts of Ukraine, northern and eastern Kazakhstan, and the Georgian breakaway states of Abkhazia and South Ossetia.

The "Russian world" is a vaguely defined term, mostly used to refer to communities with a historical, cultural, or spiritual tie to Russia. This can include all ethnic Russians and Russian speakers in neighboring states, as well as those who belong to the Russian Orthodox Church. Its proponents believe Russia is a "unique civilization" and a bastion of "traditional values" and national conservatism. The "Russian world" idea is linked to Russian neo-imperialism. Jeffrey Mankoff of the Institute for National Strategic Studies says that the "Russian world" embodies "the idea of a Russian imperial nation transcending the Russian Federation's borders" and challenges "neighboring states' efforts to construct their own civic nations and disentangle their histories from Russia". A number of observers see the "Russian world" concept as revanchist, with the goal of restoring Russia's borders or its influence back to that of the Soviet Union and the Russian Empire.

In the 1990s, Russian neo-fascist philosopher Aleksandr Dugin began writing about Russia as a unique Eurasian civilization. Dugin was later an adviser to Russian president Vladimir Putin. Other authors behind the development of the concept in post-Soviet Russia include Pyotr Shchedrovitsky, Yefim Ostrovsky, Valery Tishkov, Vitaly Skrinnik, Tatyana Poloskova and Natalya Narochnitskaya. In 2000, Shchedrovitsky presented the main ideas of the "Russian world" concept in the article "Russian World and Transnational Russian Characteristics", among the most important of which was the Russian language. Andis Kudors of the Woodrow Wilson International Center for Scholars, analyzing Shchedrovitsky's article, concludes that it follows ideas first laid out by the 18th century philosopher Johann Gottfried Herder about the influence of language on thinking (which has become known as the principle of linguistic relativity): those who speak Russian come to "think Russian", and eventually to "act Russian".

Observers describe the concept as a tool of Russian soft power. According to assistant editor Pavel Tikhomirov of Russkaya Liniya, many Ukrainians see the "Russian world" as neo-Sovietism under another name. The Financial Times described the "Russian world" as "Putin’s creation that fuses respect for Russia's Tsarist, Orthodox past with reverence for the Soviet defeat of fascism in the Second World War. This is epitomised in the Main Cathedral of the Russian Armed Forces, 40 miles west of Moscow, opened in 2020".

The Economist says that the "Russian world" concept has become the basis of a crusade against the West's "liberal" culture and has fed a "new Russian cult of war". It says that Putin's regime has debased the "Russian world" concept with a mixture of obscurantism, Orthodox dogma, anti-Western sentiment, nationalism, conspiracy theory and security-state Stalinism.

=== Russian government ===
Eventually, the idea of the "Russian world" was adopted by the Russian government under Vladimir Putin. In 2001, he said "The notion of the Russian World extends far from Russia's geographical borders and even far from the borders of the Russian ethnicity".

Putin visited the Arkaim site of the Sintashta culture in 2005, meeting the chief archaeologist Gennady Zdanovich. The visit was widely covered in Russian media, which presented Arkaim as the "homeland of the majority of contemporary people in Asia, and, partly, Europe". Nationalists called Arkaim the "city of Russian glory" and the "most ancient Slavic-Aryan town". Zdanovich reportedly presented Arkaim to the president as a possible "national idea of Russia", a new idea of civilisation which Victor Schnirelmann calls the "Russian idea".

Putin decreed the establishment of the government-sponsored Russkiy Mir Foundation in 2007, to foster the idea of the "Russian world" abroad. It "has largely served as a way to push a Russian-centric agenda in former Soviet states".

=== Russian Orthodox Church ===
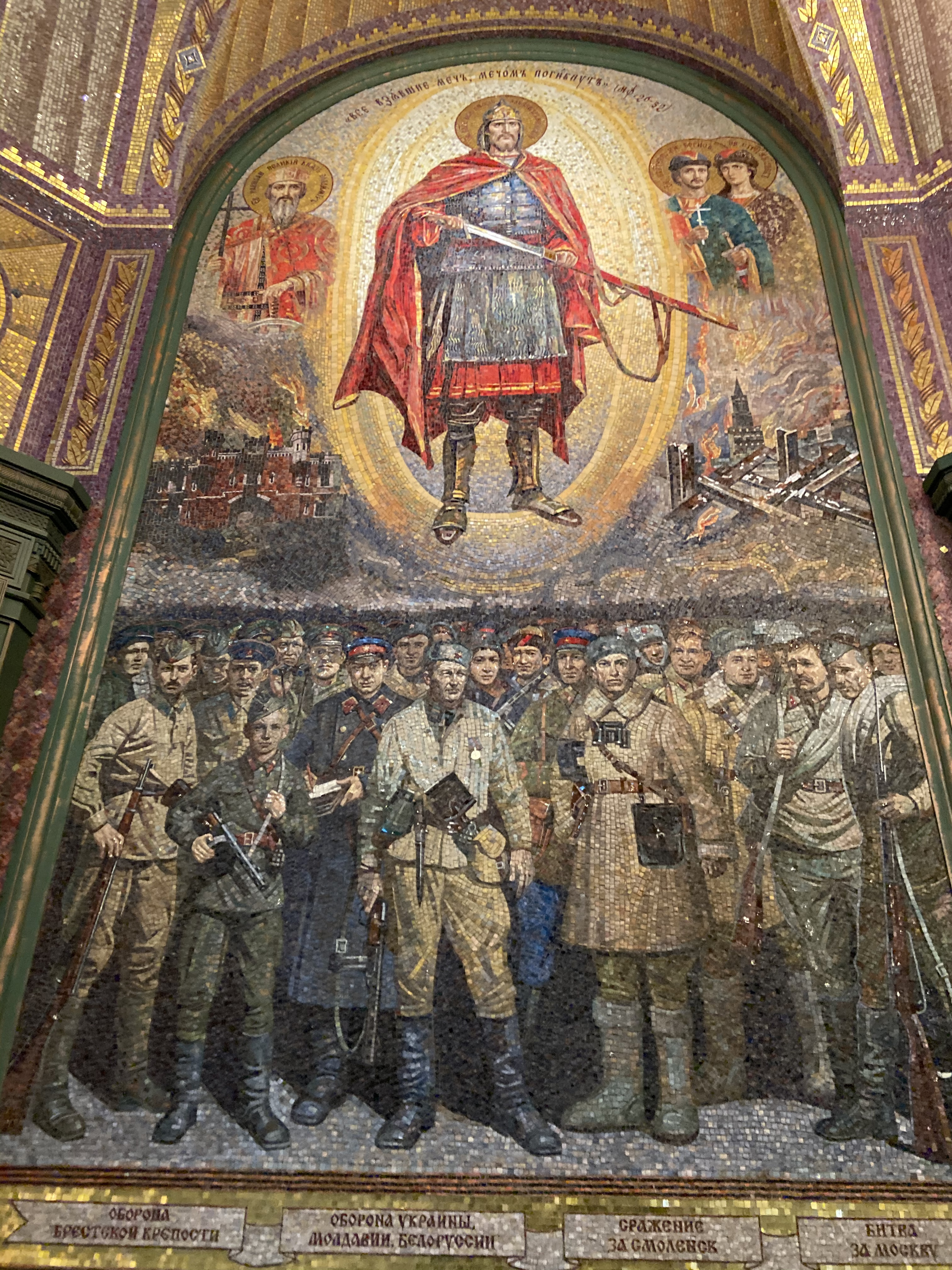
A mosaic in the Main Cathedral of the Russian Armed Forces blending Eastern Orthodox iconography with propagandistic socialist realist art styles

The "Russian world" concept is promoted by many in the leadership of the Russian Orthodox Church. On 3 November 2009, at the Third Russian World Assembly, newly enthroned Patriarch Kirill of Moscow defined the "Russian world" as "the common civilisational space founded on three pillars: Eastern Orthodoxy, Russian culture and especially the language and the common historical memory". For the Russian Orthodox Church, the Russian world is "a spiritual concept, a reminder that through the baptism of Rus, God consecrated these people to the task of building a Holy Rus".

Patriarch Kirill's 2009 tour of Ukraine was described by Oleh Medvedev, adviser to Ukraine's prime minister, as "a visit of an imperialist who preached the neo-imperialist Russian World doctrine".

==== Orthodox condemnations ====
In the wake of the 2022 Russian invasion of Ukraine, 1,600 theologians and clerics of the Eastern Orthodox Church issued the Declaration on the 'Russian World' Teaching, commonly known as the Volos Declaration. It condemned the "Russian world" ideology as being heretical and a deviation from the Orthodox faith. This declaration called the "Russian world" a heresy that is "totalitarian in character". They condemned six "pseudo theological facets" of the "Russian world" concept: replacing the Kingdom of God with an earthly kingdom; deification of the state through a theocracy and caesaropapism which deprives the Church of its freedom to stand against injustice; divinization of a culture; Manichaean demonization of the West; refusal to speak the truth and non-acknowledgement of "murderous intent and culpability".

Not all Orthodox commentators agree that the "Russian world" should technically be classified as a heresy. Ukrainian Orthodox author Michael Sheludko has argued that, while the ideology does not alter the principal dogmas of Christianity and therefore does not meet the classical theological definition of heresy, it represents a profound distortion of orthopraxy, particularly through the sacralization of political violence, nationalism and state power.

Following this, among the Orthodox Patriarchates from the Pentarchy, two have condemned the ideology as contrary to the teachings of Christ, linking it to phyletism, an ideology condemned as an heresy by a General Synod in Constantinople in 1872. The first to do so was the Church of Alexandria and all-Africa and their Patriarch, Theodore II. They were followed by the Ecumenical Patriarchate of Constantinople, the first Orthodox Church in rank and honor.

In their epistolary exchange of early 2023, Ecumenical Patriarch Bartholomew I of Constantinople and Archbishop George III of Cyprus discussed the issue extensively.

== Russia's war against Ukraine ==
In Ukraine, the promotion of the "Russian world" became as early as 2018 strongly associated with the Russo-Ukrainian War. The Russian invasion of Ukraine is said to implement the idea of the "Russian world". Putin referenced Fyodor Ushakov, an admiral who is the Orthodox patron saint of the Russian Navy. Putin recalled Ushakov's words: "the storms of war would glorify Russia". The Economist also pointed to Patriarch Kirill's declaration of the godliness of the war and its role in keeping out the West's alleged decadent gay culture, and to the priest Elizbar Orlov who said that Russia's "special military operation" in Ukraine is cleansing the world of "a diabolic infection".

On 25 December 2022, in an interview for national television, Putin openly declared that Russia's goal is "to unite the Russian people" within a single state. In June 2023, Putin said that Russian soldiers killed in the invasion of Ukraine "gave their lives for Novorossiya [New Russia] and for the unity of the Russian world". In 2025, he claimed Russians and Ukrainians were "one people" and that in a sense, "the whole of Ukraine is ours".

Orlando Figes defines the invasion as "imperial expansionism" and writes that the Russians' sense of superiority may help to explain its brutality: "The Russian killings of civilians, their rapes of women, and other acts of terror are driven by a post-imperial urge to take revenge and punish them, to make them pay for their independence from Russia, for their determination to be part of Europe, to be Ukrainians, and not subjects of the 'Russian world'."

== In art ==
- Donbass (film)

== Investigative documentaries ==
- Navalny's team's work on the history of the Russo-Ukrainian war
- A documentary "Anatomy of Rushism"

== See also ==
- All-Russian nation – Imperial and modern Russian irredentist ideology
- On the Historical Unity of Russians and Ukrainians - A 2021 essay written by Vladimir Putin not long before the 2022 Russian invasion of Ukraine
- Geographical distribution of Russian speakers
- Moscow, third Rome – Theological and political concept
- Near abroad – Russian term for post-Soviet states
- Pan-Slavism – Political ideology emphasising unity of Slavic peoples
- Putinism – Political system in Russia under Vladimir Putin
- Ruscism – Term describing Russian political ideology
- Russian imperialism
- Russian irredentism
- Russian nationalism – Russian political ideology
- Russification – Measures to increase the influence of Russian culture and language
- Serbian world – Serbian nationalist and irredentist concept
- Z (military symbol) – Russian military and propaganda symbol
