= Philotheus of Pskov =

Russian monk (died 1542)

Philotheus of Pskov (Russian: Филофей Псковский, romanized: Filofey Pskovskiy; c. 1465 – 1542) was a hegumen of the Yelizarov Monastery, near Pskov, in the 16th century. He is credited with authorship of the Legend of the White Cowl and the Moscow - Third Rome prophecy, details of which are very scarce. He is popularly known as the presumed author of the concept of Moscow as the Third Rome; Philotheus set out this thesis in his letters to the priest Mikhail Grigorievich Misyur-Munekhin and to Grand Duke Vasily III.

In reality, these letters are mainly devoted to other issues, mostly talking about Church issues, and only refer to Moscow or Muscovy rather obliquely. Their main message in this regard is rather to remind the tsar about his ecclesiastical position of Protector of Faith, as the two previous capitals of Orthodoxy, Rome and Constantinople, both fell, first to the Latin heretics, and second to the Muslim heathens, with Moscow remaining its sole bastion. Philotheus prophecy could then best construed that the Muscovy (or Russia in general) will stand as far as it remains true to the Orthodox faith.

His alleged authorship of the essays On the Grievances of the Church to Ivan the Terrible, was refuted by scholars, as it contained elements of discrepancy with his first epistle. The person who wrote this essay, using the name of Philotheus, tied the theme of "Third Rome" to the protection of property rights of the church.

In August 2009, it was reported that archaeologists had discovered a grave in Pskov, allegedly belonging to Philotheus.
