= The Legend of the White Cowl =

Russian Orthodox story

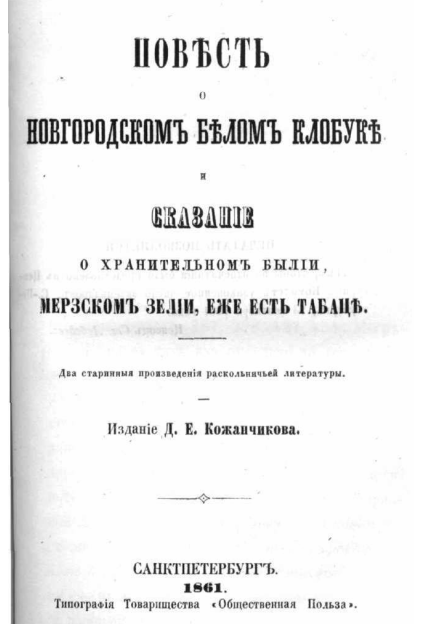
Cover page of the 1861 publishing

The Legend of the White Cowl (Church Slavonic: По́вѣсть ω бѣ́ломъ клобуцѣ́; Russian: Повесть о белом клобуке) is a Russian Orthodox story first recorded by the monk Philotheus of Pskov in 1510. It tells of the passage of a religious relic of great significance through great danger from Rome to Constantinople and finally to Moscow, at a time that many Russians believed the pre-eminent Christian Church in the world to be transferred in Moscow.

== Historical context ==
In the early 16th century, the Russian Orthodox Church was in the process of asserting its independence from the Ecumenical Patriarchate of Constantinople and the recently destroyed Byzantine Empire. The Legend of the White Cowl asserts the historical and religious inevitability of Russia's place as the heir to the Byzantine Empire's temporal and religious authority. The Patriarch of Constantinople eventually recognized the independence of the Russian church, in 1589.

The Legend of the White Cowl also fits into the Third Rome ideology in Russia of the time. Just as Constantinople had been the Second Rome, Russia rose to become the Third. In that interpretation, the cowl functions almost as a baton in a footrace, being passed from one city to the next and bearing with it pre-eminence.

In 1667, the story was condemned by the Great Moscow Synod as "false and wrong" and as constructed by Dmitry Tolmach (different experts understand by this name either Dmitry Trakhaniot, or Dmitry Gerasimov, both of them bore this nickname). Historians believe the condemnation could have been motivated by the Moscow Council's clashes with Novgorod. Because of this condemnation, the story became popular among Old Believers.

== Legend ==
In the mid-14th century, the Patriarch of Constantinople was Philotheos, of legendary Christian virtue and piety. One night, he had a vision of a radiant youth, who told him that Constantine gave Pope Sylvester I a white cowl for the glory of the Church. It was, for a time, in the possession of the Roman Catholic Popes in the West, but they eventually sent the cowl to Philotheos. The youth told Philotheos that he should accept the gift and immediately forward it to Novgorod, Russia before the corrupt Western Church could demand its return.

The Pope did indeed demand the return of the Cowl, but the Patriarch of Constantinople wisely refused. Initially, the Patriarch wished to keep the holy relic in his own city, but the radiant youth appeared to him again and told him of the Empire's impending doom at the hands of the Turks. The Patriarch saw the wisdom in this warning and promptly sent the Cowl on to Novgorod, where it arrived safely. It was then presented to the Archbishop Vasilii Kalika (1330–1352). The White Cowl or hood became a special symbol unique to the Archbishop of Novgorod. In fact, a church council in 1564 confirmed the right of the archbishops to wear the white cowl and use red wax seals on their correspondence (the latter privilege had previously been reserved for the grand prince and patriarch).

Today the Patriarch and metropolitans wear white cowls. The archbishop of Novgorod wears a black cowl like other bishops.

== Notes ==
Since the previous sack of Constantinople by the Fourth Crusade in 1204, the idea that the Byzantine Empire could not withstand a crusade had gained much credibility. Therefore, hiding such a relic would be viewed by Russian Orthodox readers as quite rational. Similarly, with the fall of the Byzantine Empire to the Ottoman Empire in 1453, Russian Orthodox readers in 1510 would have identified with the urgency of protecting such relics.

== See also ==
- Klobuk, the white cowl
