= Legacy of the Roman Empire =

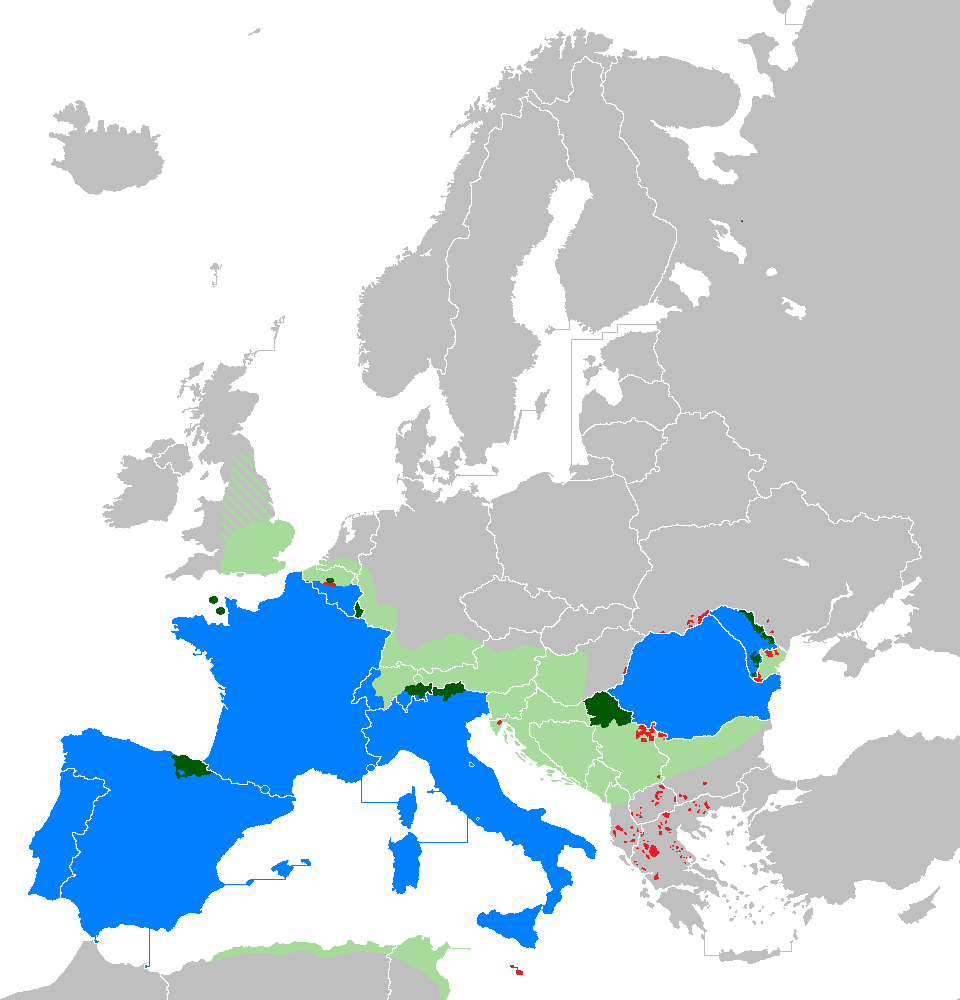
Official Romance language Co-official Romance language Latin language was spoken in antiquity but has disappeared. Romance language is spoken but not official.

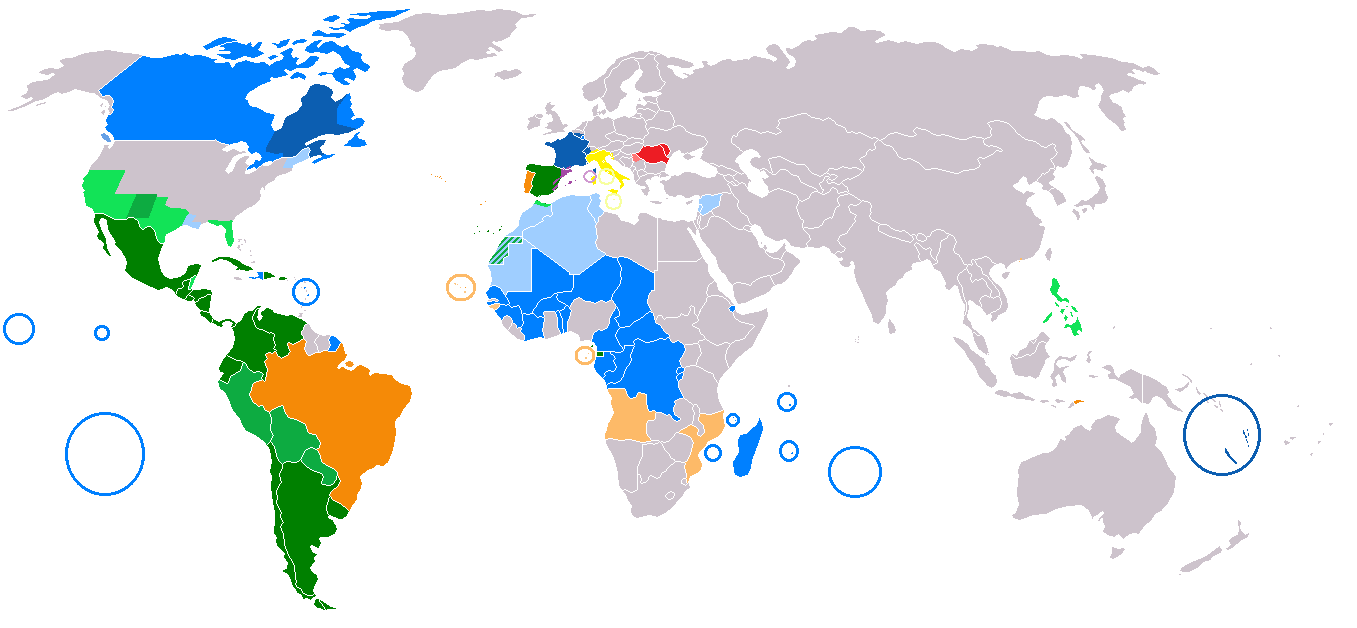
Global distribution of the Romance languages: French Spanish Portuguese Italian Romanian Catalan

The legacy of the Roman Empire has been varied and significant. The Roman Empire, built upon the legacy of other cultures, has had long-lasting influence with broad geographical reach on a great range of cultural aspects, including state institutions, law, values, religious beliefs, technological advances, engineering, and language.

This legacy survived the demise of the empire (5th century AD in the West, and 15th century AD in the East) and went on to shape other civilisations, a process which continues. Rome was the civitas (reflected in the etymology of the word "civilisation") and connected with the actual western civilisation on which subsequent cultures built is the Latin language of ancient Rome, epitomized by the Classical Latin used in Latin literature, which evolved during the Middle Ages and remains in use in the Roman Catholic Church as Ecclesiastical Latin. Vulgar Latin, the common tongue used for regular social interactions, evolved simultaneously into Romance languages that still exist today, such as Italian, French, Spanish, Portuguese, Catalan, and Romanian. Although the Western Roman Empire fell in the 5th century AD, the Eastern Roman Empire continued until its conquest by the Ottoman Empire in the 15th century AD and cemented the Greek language in many parts of the Eastern Mediterranean even after the Early Muslim conquests of the 7th century AD. Roman paganism was largely displaced by Nicene Christianity after the 4th century AD and the Christian conversion of Roman emperor Constantine I (r. 306–337 AD). The Christian faith of the late Roman Empire continued to evolve during the Middle Ages and remains a major facet of the religion and the psyche of the modern Western world.

Ancient Roman architecture, largely indebted to ancient Greek architecture of the Hellenistic period, has influenced the architecture of the Western world, particularly during the Italian Renaissance of the 15th century. Roman law and republican politics (from the age of the Roman Republic) have left an enduring legacy, influencing the Italian city-state republics of the Medieval period, as well as the United States and other modern democratic republics. The Julian calendar of ancient Rome formed the basis of the standard modern Gregorian calendar, while Roman inventions and engineering, such as the construction of concrete domes, continued to influence various peoples after the fall of Rome. Roman models of colonialism and warfare became influential.

== Language ==
Latin became the lingua franca of the early Roman Empire and later of the Western Roman Empire, while – particularly in the Eastern Roman Empire – indigenous languages such as Greek and to a lesser degree Egyptian and Aramaic continued in use. Despite the decline of the Western Roman Empire, the Latin language continued to flourish in the very different social and economic environment of the Middle Ages, not least because it became the official language of the Roman Catholic Church. Koine Greek, which served as a lingua franca in the Eastern Empire, remains in use today as a sacred language in some Eastern Orthodox churches.

In Western and Central Europe and in parts of northern Africa, Latin retained its elevated status as the main vehicle of communication for the learned classes throughout the Middle Ages and subsequently, especially the Renaissance and Baroque periods. Books which had a revolutionary impact on science, such as Nicolaus Copernicus' De revolutionibus orbium coelestium (1543), were composed in Latin. This language was not supplanted for scientific purposes until the 18th century, and for formal descriptions in zoology as well as botany it survived to the later 20th century. The modern international binomial nomenclature holds to this day: taxonomists assign a Latin or Latinized scientific name to each species.

In the 21st century, the Romance languages, which comprise all languages that descended from Latin, are spoken by more than 920 million people as their mother tongue, and by 300 million people as a second language, mainly in the Americas, Europe, and Africa. Romance languages are either official, co-official, or significantly used in 72 countries around the world. Of the United Nations' six official languages, two (French and Spanish) descend from Latin.

Additionally, Latin has had a great influence on the lexicon of West Germanic languages. Romance words make respectively 59%, 20%, and 14% of English, German, and Dutch vocabularies. Those figures can rise dramatically when only non-compound and non-derived words are included. Accordingly, Romance words make roughly 35% of the vocabulary of Dutch. Of all the loanwords in Dutch, 32.2% come directly from some form of Latin (excluding loans from Romance languages). Up to 60% of Albanian vocabulary consists of Latin roots, causing Albanian to once have been mistakenly identified as a Romance language.

=== Script ===
Global distribution of the Latin script

All three official scripts of the modern European Union—Latin, Greek, and Cyrillic—descend from writing systems used in the Roman Empire. Today, the Latin script, the Latin alphabet spread by the Roman Empire to most of Europe, and derived from the Phoenician alphabet through an ancient form of the Greek alphabet adopted and modified by Etruscan, is the most widespread and commonly used script in the world. Spread by various colonies, trade routes, and political powers, the script has continued to grow in influence. The Greek alphabet, which had spread throughout the eastern Mediterranean region during the Hellenistic period, remained the primary script of the Eastern Roman Empire through the Byzantine Empire until its demise in the 15th century. Cyrillic scripts largely derive from the Greek.

=== Latin literature ===
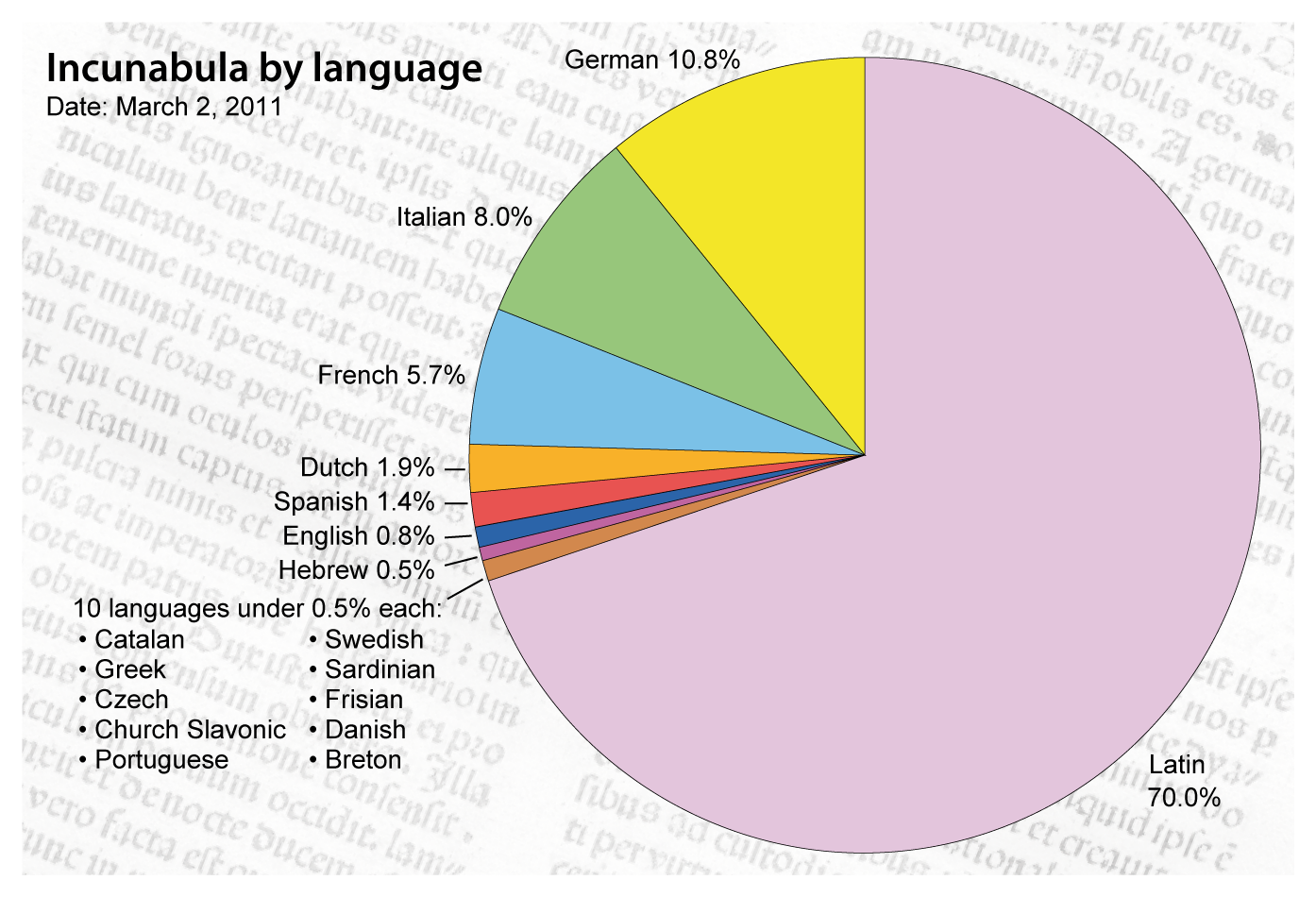
15th-century printed books by language. The high prestige of Latin meant that that language still dominated European published discourse a millennium after the demise of the Western Roman Empire.

The Carolingian Renaissance of the 8th century rescued many works in Latin from oblivion: manuscripts transcribed at that time are our only sources for some works that later fell into obscurity once more, only to be recovered during the Renaissance: Tacitus, Lucretius, Propertius, and Catullus furnish examples. Other Latin writers never went out of circulation: Virgil, reinterpreted as a prophet of Christianity by the 4th century, gained the reputation of a sorcerer in the 12th century.

Cicero, in a limited number of his works, remained a model of good style, mined for quotations. Medieval Christians read Ovid allegorically, or re-imagined Seneca as the correspondent of Saint Paul. Lucan, Persius, Juvenal, Horace, Terence, and Statius survived in the continuing canon and the historians Valerius Maximus and Livy continued to be read for the moral lessons history was expected to impart.

Through the Roman Empire, Greek literature also continued to make an impact in Europe long after the Empire's fall, especially after the recovery of Greek texts from the East during the high Middle Ages and the resurgence of Greek literacy during the Renaissance. Many educated Westerners from the Renaissance up to the 20th century, for instance, read Plutarch's Lives of the Noble Greeks and Romans, originally written in Greek. Shakespeare's play Julius Caesar takes most of its material from Plutarch's biographies of Caesar, Cato, and Brutus, whose exploits were frequently discussed and debated by the literati of Shakespeare's time.

== Education ==
Martianus Capella developed the system of the seven liberal arts that structured medieval education. Although the liberal arts were already known in Ancient Greece, it was only after Martianus that the seven liberal arts took on canonical form. His single encyclopedic work, De nuptiis Philologiae et Mercurii "On the Marriage of Philology and Mercury", laid the standard formula of academic learning from the Christianized Roman Empire of the 5th century until the Renaissance of the 12th century.

The seven liberal arts were formed by the trivium, which included the skills of grammar, logic, and rhetoric, while arithmetic, geometry, music, and astronomy played part as the quadrivium.

== Calendar and measurement ==
The modern Western calendar is a refinement of the Julian calendar, which was introduced by Julius Caesar. The calendar of the Roman Empire began with the months Ianuarius (January), Februarius (February), and Martius (March). The common tradition to begin the year on 1 January was a convention established in ancient Rome. Throughout the medieval period, the year began on 25 March, the Catholic Solemnity of the Annunciation.

The 5th-century Roman monk Dionysius Exiguus devised the modern dating system of the Anno Domini (AD) era, which is based on the reckoned year of the birth of Jesus, with AD counting years from the start of this epoch, and BC denoting years before the start of the era.

The modern seven-day week follows the Greco-Roman system of planetary hours, in which one of the seven heavenly bodies of the Solar System that were known in ancient times—Saturn, Jupiter, Mars, the Sun, Venus, Mercury, and the Moon—is given "rulership" over each day. The Romance languages (with the exception of Portuguese, that assigns an ordinal number to five days of the week, from Monday to Friday, beginning with segunda-feira, and ending with sexta-feira) preserve the original Latin names of each day of the week, except for Sunday, which came to be called dies dominicus (Lord's Day) under Christianity.

Day	Sunday Sōl (Sun)	Monday Luna (Moon)	Tuesday Mars (Mars)	Wednesday Mercurius (Mercury)	Thursday Iuppiter (Jupiter)	Friday Venus (Venus)	Saturday Saturnus (Saturn)
Latin	dies Sōlis	dies Lūnae	dies Martis	dies Mercuriī	dies Iovis	dies Veneris	dies Saturnī
Italian	domenica	lunedì	martedì	mercoledì	giovedì	venerdì	sabato
French	dimanche	lundi	mardi	mercredi	jeudi	vendredi	samedi
Spanish	domingo	lunes	martes	miércoles	jueves	viernes	sábado
Romanian	duminică	luni	marți	miercuri	joi	vineri	sâmbătă
Catalan	diumenge	dilluns	dimarts	dimecres	dijous	divendres	dissabte

=== Hours of the day ===
The 12-hour clock is a time convention popularized by the Romans in which the 24 hours of the day are divided into two periods. The Romans divided the day into 12 equal hours, A.M. (ante-meridiem, meaning before midday) and P.M. (post-meridiem, meaning past midday). The Romans also started the practice used worldwide today of a new day beginning at midnight.

=== Numerals and units ===
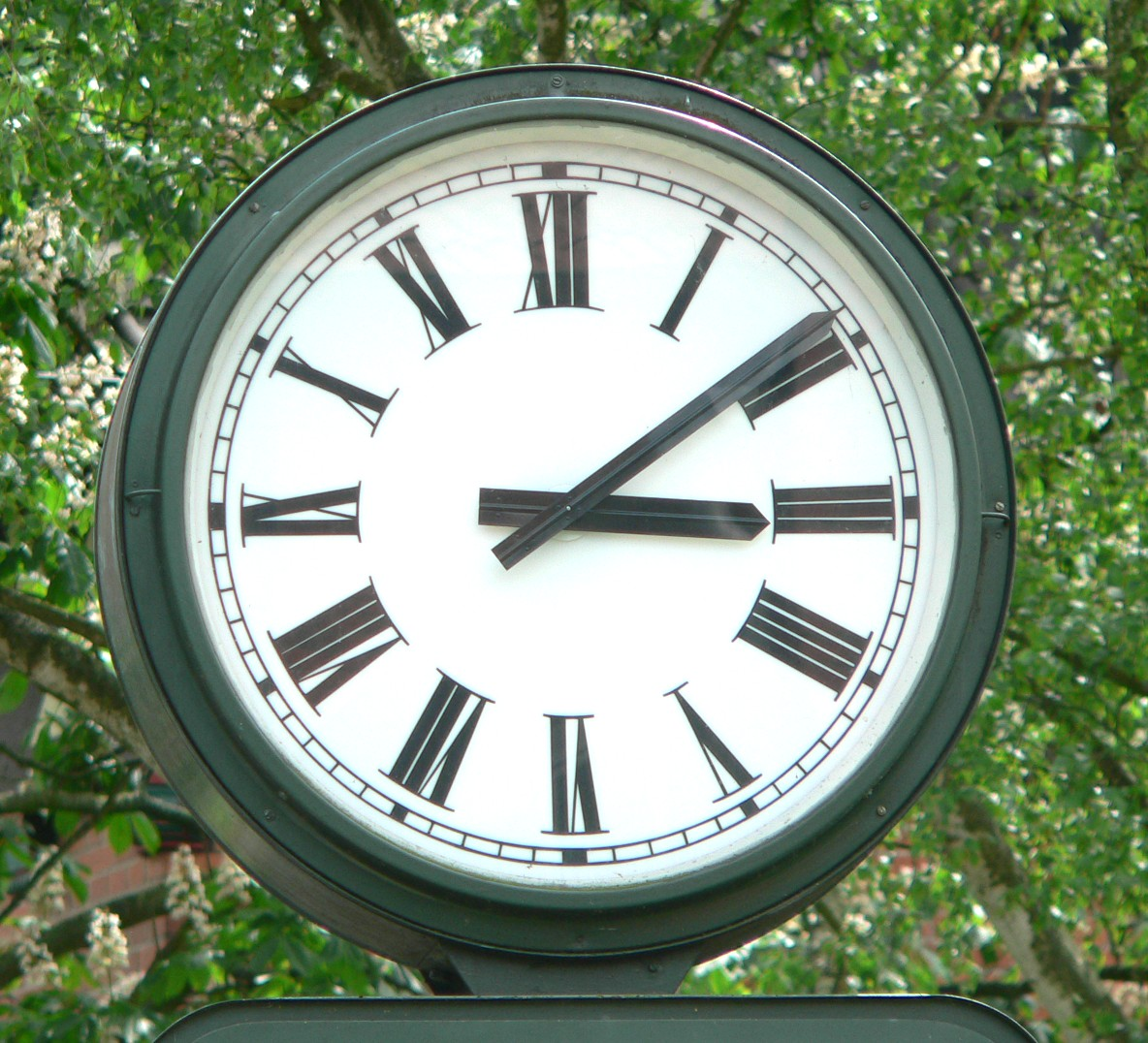
A typical clock face with Roman numerals in Bad Salzdetfurth, Germany. The notion of a twelve-hour day dates to the Roman Empire.

Roman numerals continued as the primary way of writing numbers in Europe until the 14th century, when they were largely replaced in common usage by Hindu–Arabic numerals. The Roman numeral system continues to be widely used, however, in certain formal and minor contexts, such as on clock faces, coins, in the year of construction on cornerstone inscriptions, and in generational suffixes (such as Louis XIV or William Howard Taft IV). Romance languages (and also other languages such as Russian, Polish, and Basque) write centuries in Roman numbers; in Spanish, for example, "21st century" is written siglo XXI.

The Romans solidified the modern concept of the hour as one-24th part of a day and night. The English measurement system also retains features of the Ancient Roman foot (11.65 modern inches), which was used in England prior to the Anglo-Saxon settlement of Britain. The inch itself derives from the Roman uncia, meaning one-twelfth part.

=== Three-age systems ===
Although the present archaeological system of the three main ages—stone, bronze, and iron—originates with the Danish archaeologist Christian Jürgensen Thomsen, the concept of dividing pre-historical ages into systems based on metals extends to Ancient Rome, originated by the Roman Lucretius in the first century BC.

== Religion ==
=== Christianity ===
Christianity by percentage of population in each country

While classical Roman and Hellenistic religion were ultimately superseded by Christianity, many key theological ideas and questions that are characteristic of Western religions originated with pre-Christian theology. The first cause argument for the existence of God, for instance, originates with Plato. Design arguments, which were introduced by Socrates and Aristotle and remain widely discussed to this day, formed an influential component of Stoic theology well into the late Roman period. The problem of evil was widely discussed among ancient philosophers, including the Roman writers such as Cicero and Seneca, and many of the answers they provided were later absorbed into Christian theodicy. In Christian moral theology, moreover, the field of natural law ethics draws heavily on the tradition established by Aristotle, the Stoics, and especially by Cicero's popular Latin work, De Legibus. Cicero's conception of natural law "found its way to later centuries notably through the writings of Saint Isidore of Seville and the Decretum of Gratian" and influenced the discussion of the topic up through the era of the American Revolution.

Christianity itself also spread through the Roman Empire; since emperor Theodosius I (AD 379–395), the official state church of the Roman Empire was Christianity. Subsequently, former Roman territories became Christian states which exported their religion to other parts of the world, through colonization and missionaries.

Christianity also served as a conduit for preserving and transmitting Greco-Roman literary culture. Classical educational tradition in the liberal arts was preserved after the fall of the empire by the medieval Christian university. Education in the Middle Ages relied heavily on Greco-Roman books such as Euclid's Elements and the influential quadrivium textbooks written in Latin by the Roman statesman Boethius (AD 480–524).

Major works of Greek and Latin literature, moreover, were both read and written by Christians during the imperial era. Many of the most influential works of the early Christian tradition were written by Roman and Hellenized theologians who engaged heavily with the literary culture of the empire (see Church Fathers). St. Augustine's (AD 354–430) City of God, for instance, draws extensively on Virgil, Cicero, Varro, Homer, Plato, and elements of Roman values and identity to criticize paganism and advocate for Christianity amid a crumbling empire. The engagement of early Christians as both readers and writers of important Roman and Greek literature helped to ensure that the literary culture of Rome would persist after the fall of the empire. For thousands of years to follow, religious scholars in the Latin West from Bede to Thomas Aquinas and later renaissance figures such as Dante, Montaigne, and Shakespeare would continue to read, reference, and imitate both Christian and pagan literature from the Roman Empire. In the east, the empire's prolific tradition of Greek literature continued uninterrupted after the fall of the west, in part due to the works of the Greek fathers, who were widely read by Christians in medieval Byzantium and continue to influence religious thought to this day (see Byzantine literature). The division of Catholicism and Eastern Orthodoxy was also created as a result of the Eastern Roman Empire's religious conflicts with the Papacy in the 11th century.

=== Pagan revival ===
There have been revivals of the ancient Roman polytheistic religion in modern times, mostly in Italy. While interest in reviving the ancient Roman paganism dates back to the Renaissance, this phenomenon intensified in the 19th and 20th centuries. Today it has a presence mostly in the Western world, with Nova Roma being the most notable international revivalist organization.

== Science and philosophy ==
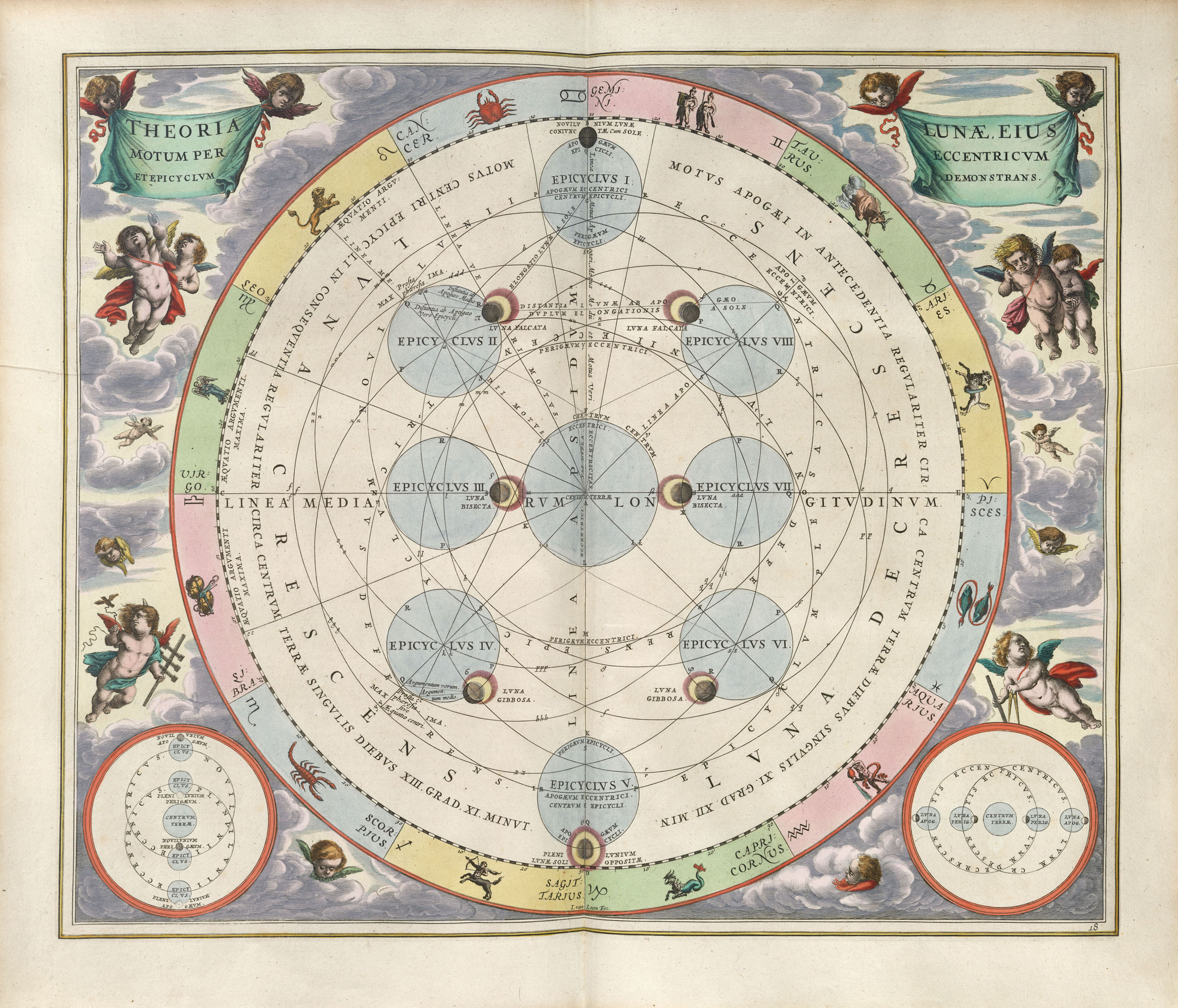
Ptolemy's refined geocentric theory of epicycles was backed up by rigorous mathematics and detailed astronomical observations. It was not overturned until the Copernican Revolution, over a thousand years later.

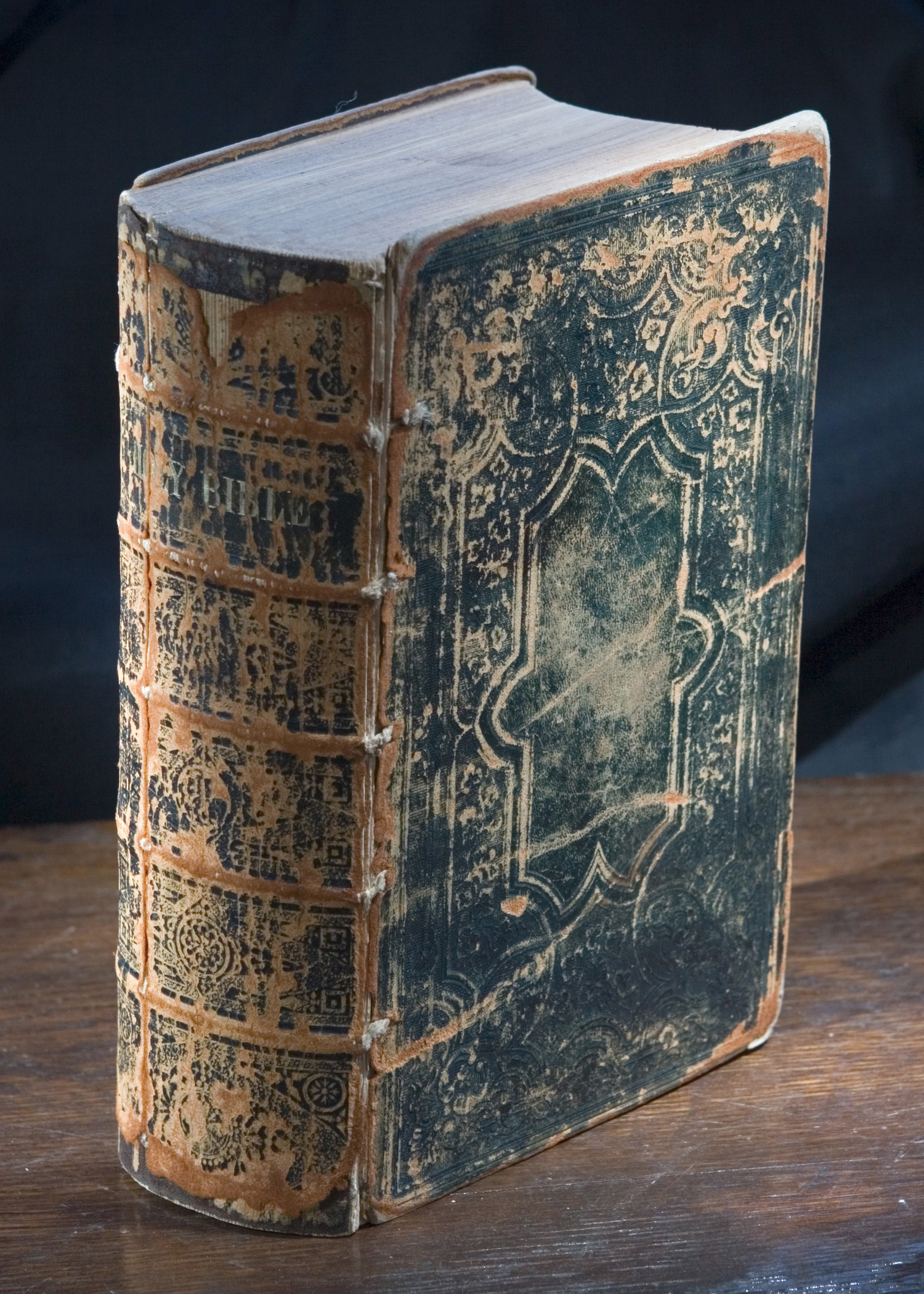
The Bible as codex. The codex, the book format today in universal use, was invented by the Romans and spread by Roman Christians.

While much of the most influential Greek science and philosophy was developed before the rise of the Empire, major innovations occurred under Roman rule that have had a lasting impact on the intellectual world. The traditions of Greek, Egyptian, and Babylonian scholarship continued to flourish at great centers of learning such as Athens, Alexandria, and Pergamon.

Epicurean philosophy reached a literary apex in the long poem by Lucretius, who advocated an atomic theory of matter and revered the older teachings of the Greek Democritus. The works of the philosophers Seneca the Younger, Epictetus, and the Roman emperor Marcus Aurelius were widely read during the revival of Stoic thought in the Renaissance, which synthesized Stoicism and Christianity. Fighter pilot James Stockdale famously credited the philosophy of Epictetus as being a major source of strength when he was shot down and held as prisoner during the Vietnam War. Plato's philosophy continued to be widely studied under the Empire, growing into the sophisticated neoplatonic system through the influence of Plotinus. Platonic philosophy was largely reconciled with Christianity by the Roman theologian Augustine of Hippo, who, while a staunch opponent of Roman paganism, viewed the Platonists as having more in common with Christians than the other pagan schools. To this day, Plato's Republic is considered the foundational work of Western philosophy, and is read by students around the globe.

The widespread Lorem ipsum text, which is widely used as a meaningless placeholder in modern typography and graphic design, is derived from the Latin text of Cicero's philosophical treatise De finibus.

Pagan philosophy was gradually supplanted by Christianity in the later years of the Empire, culminating in the closure of the Academy of Athens by Justinian I. Many Greek-speaking philosophers moved to the east, outside the borders of the Empire. Neoplatonism and Aristotelianism gained a stronghold in Persia, where they were a heavy influence on early Islamic philosophy. Thinkers of the Islamic Golden Age such as Ibn Sina (Avicenna) and Ibn Rushd (Averroës) engaged deeply with Greek philosophy, and played a major role in saving works of Aristotle that had been lost to the Latin West. The influence of Greek philosophy on Islam was dramatically reduced In the 11th century when the views of Avicenna and Averroes were strongly criticized by Al-Ghazali. His Incoherence of the Philosophers is among the most influential books in Islamic history. In Western Europe, meanwhile, the recovery of Greek texts during the Scholastic period had a profound influence on Latin science and theology from the Middle Ages into the Renaissance.

In science, the theories of the Greco-Roman physician Galen dominated Western medical thought and practice for more than 1,300 years. Ptolemy produced the most thorough and sophisticated astronomical theory of antiquity, documented in the Almagest. The Ptolemaic model of the solar system would remain the dominant approach to astronomy across Europe and the Middle East for more than a thousand years. Forty-eight of the 88 constellations the IAU recognizes today are recorded in the seventh and eighth books of Claudius Ptolemy's Almagest.

At Alexandria, the engineer and experimenter Hero of Alexandria founded the study of mechanics and pneumatics. In modern geometry, Heron's formula bears his name. Roman Alexandria also saw the seeds of modern algebra arise in the works of Diophantus. Greek algebra continued to be studied in the east well after the fall of the Western Empire, where it matured into modern algebra in the hands of al-Khwārizmī (see the history of algebra). The study of Diophantine equations and Diophantine approximations are still important areas of mathematical research today.

All of the planets in the Solar System, excluding Earth and Uranus, are named after Roman deities in the English language.

== Roman law and politics ==
Although the law of the Roman Empire is not used today, modern law in many jurisdictions is based on principles of law used and developed during the Roman Empire. Some of the same Latin terminology is still used today. The general structure of jurisprudence used today, in many jurisdictions, is the same (trial with a judge, plaintiff, and defendant) as that established during the Roman Empire.

The modern concept of republican government is directly modeled on the Roman Republic. The republican institutions of Rome survived in many of the Italian city-states of the Middle Ages and the Renaissance. The form, function, and symbols of the United States Congress draw heavily on the Roman Senate and legislative assemblies, while the president holds a position similar to that of a Roman consul. Many European political thinkers of the Enlightenment were avid consumers of Latin literature. Montesquieu, Edmund Burke, and John Adams were all strongly influenced by Cicero, for instance. Adams recommended Cicero as a model for politicians to imitate, and once remarked that "the sweetness and grandeur of his sounds, and the harmony of his numbers give pleasure enough to reward the reading if one understood none of his meaning."

== Inventions ==
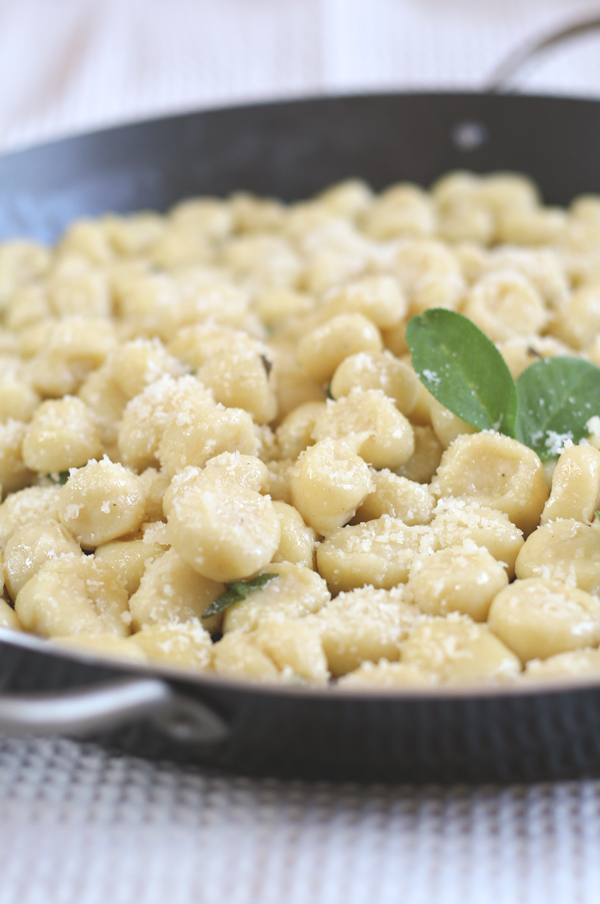
Gnocchi, a kind of traditional Italian pasta, was introduced to various parts of Europe by the Roman legions during the expansion of the empire.

Many Roman inventions were improved versions of other people's inventions and ranged from military organization, weapon improvements, armour, siege technology, naval innovation, architecture, medical instruments, irrigation, civil planning, construction, agriculture, and many more areas of civic, governmental, military, and engineering development.

That said, the Romans also developed a huge array of new technologies and innovations. Many came from common themes but were vastly superior to what had come before, while others were totally new inventions developed by and for the needs of Empire and the Roman way of life.

Some of the more famous examples are the Roman aqueducts (some of which are still in use today), Roman roads, water-powered milling machines, thermal heating systems (as employed in Roman baths, and also used in palaces and wealthy homes), sewage and pipe systems, and the invention and widespread use of concrete.

Roman aqueduct in Segovia, Spain

Metallurgy and glass work (including the first widespread use of glass windows) and a wealth of architectural innovations including highrise buildings, dome construction, bridges, and floor construction (seen in the functionality of the Colosseum's arena and the underlying rooms and areas beneath it) are other examples of Roman innovations.

Military inventiveness was widespread and included tactical and strategic innovations, new methodologies in training, discipline, and field medicine as well as inventions in all aspects of weaponry, from armor and shielding to siege engines and missile technology.

This combination of new methodologies, technical innovation, and creative invention in the military gave Rome an advantage over neighboring states for much of its history, helping it to create an empire that continues to leave its legacy in many areas of modern life.

== Colonies and roads ==
Rome left a legacy of founding many cities as colonia. There were more than 500 Roman colonies spread through the Empire, most of them populated by veterans of the Roman legions. Some Roman colonies rose to become influential commercial and trade centers, transportation hubs, and capitals of international empires, like Constantinople, London, Vienna, and Budapest.

All those colonies were connected by another important legacy of the Roman Empire: the Roman roads. Indeed, the empire comprised more than 400,000 kilometres (250,000 mi) of roads, of which over 80,500 kilometres (50,000 mi) were stone-paved. The courses (and sometimes the surfaces) of many Roman roads survived for millennia and many are overlaid by modern roads, like the Via Emilia in northern Italy. The roads are closely linked to modern-day economies, with those that survived from the empire's territorial peak in 117 CE having more economic activity today. This is especially true in European areas, which kept wheeled vehicles in the latter half of the first millennium, whereas other regions preferred cheaper methods of transport such as camel caravans.

== Architecture ==
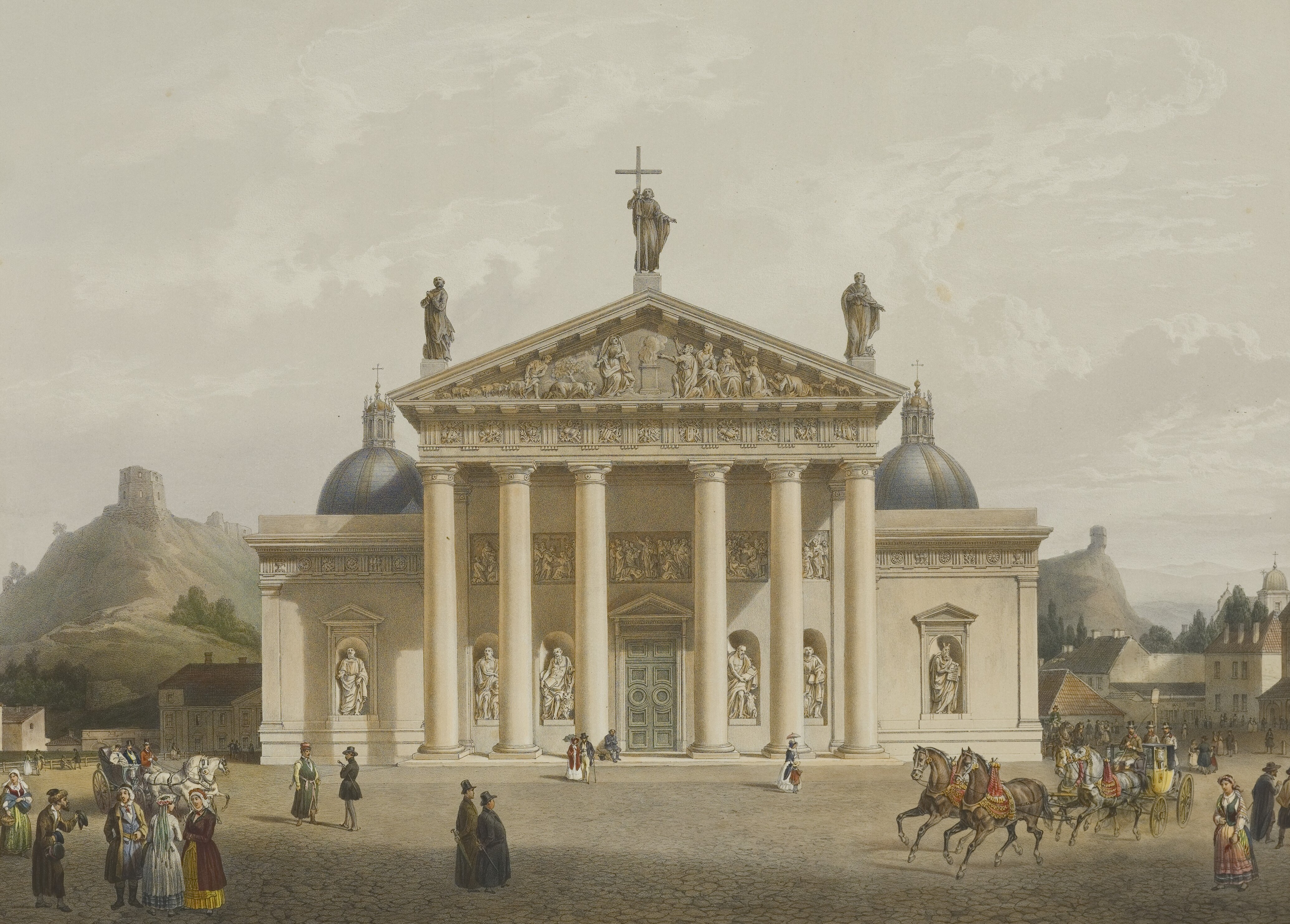
The Cathedral of Vilnius (1783), by Laurynas Gucevičius

The Renaissance-era architectural style developed by Andrea Palladio, inspired by Greek and Roman architecture, became hugely influential throughout the Western world. In the mid-18th century, Roman architecture inspired Neoclassical architecture, part of the wider international movement of Neoclassicism. Though Neoclassical architecture employs the same classical vocabulary as late Baroque architecture, it tends to emphasize its planar qualities, rather than sculptural volumes. Projections and recessions and their effects of light and shade are flatter; sculptural bas-reliefs are flatter and tend to be framed in friezes, tablets, or panels. Its clearly articulated individual features are isolated rather than interpenetrating, autonomous and complete in themselves.

International Neoclassical architecture was exemplified in Karl Friedrich Schinkel's buildings, especially the Old Museum in Berlin; Sir John Soane's Bank of England in London; and the White House and Capitol in Washington, DC in the United States. The Scots architect Charles Cameron created palatial Italianate interiors for the German-born Catherine II the Great in St. Petersburg.

Italy clung to Rococo until the Napoleonic regimes brought the new archaeological classicism, which was embraced as a political statement by young, progressive, urban Italians with republican leanings.

== Imperial idea ==
From a legal point of view, the Roman Empire, founded by Augustus in 27 BC and divided after the death of Theodosius I in 395 into two "parts" (or rather courts, as the empire continued to be considered as one), had survived only in the eastern part which, with the deposition of the last western emperor, Romulus Augustulus, in 476, had also obtained the imperial regalia of the western part, reuniting from a formal point of view the Roman Empire.

The Roman line continued uninterrupted to rule the Eastern Roman Empire, whose main characteristics were Roman concept of state, medieval Greek culture and language, and Orthodox Christian faith. The Byzantines themselves never ceased to refer to themselves as "Romans" (Rhomaioi) and to their state as the "Roman Empire", the "Empire of the Romans" (in Greek Βασιλεία των Ῥωμαίων, Basileía ton Rhōmaíōn) or "Romania" (Ῥωμανία, Rhōmanía). Likewise, they were called "Rûm" (Rome) by their eastern enemies to the point that competing neighbours even acquired its name, such as the Sultanate of Rûm.

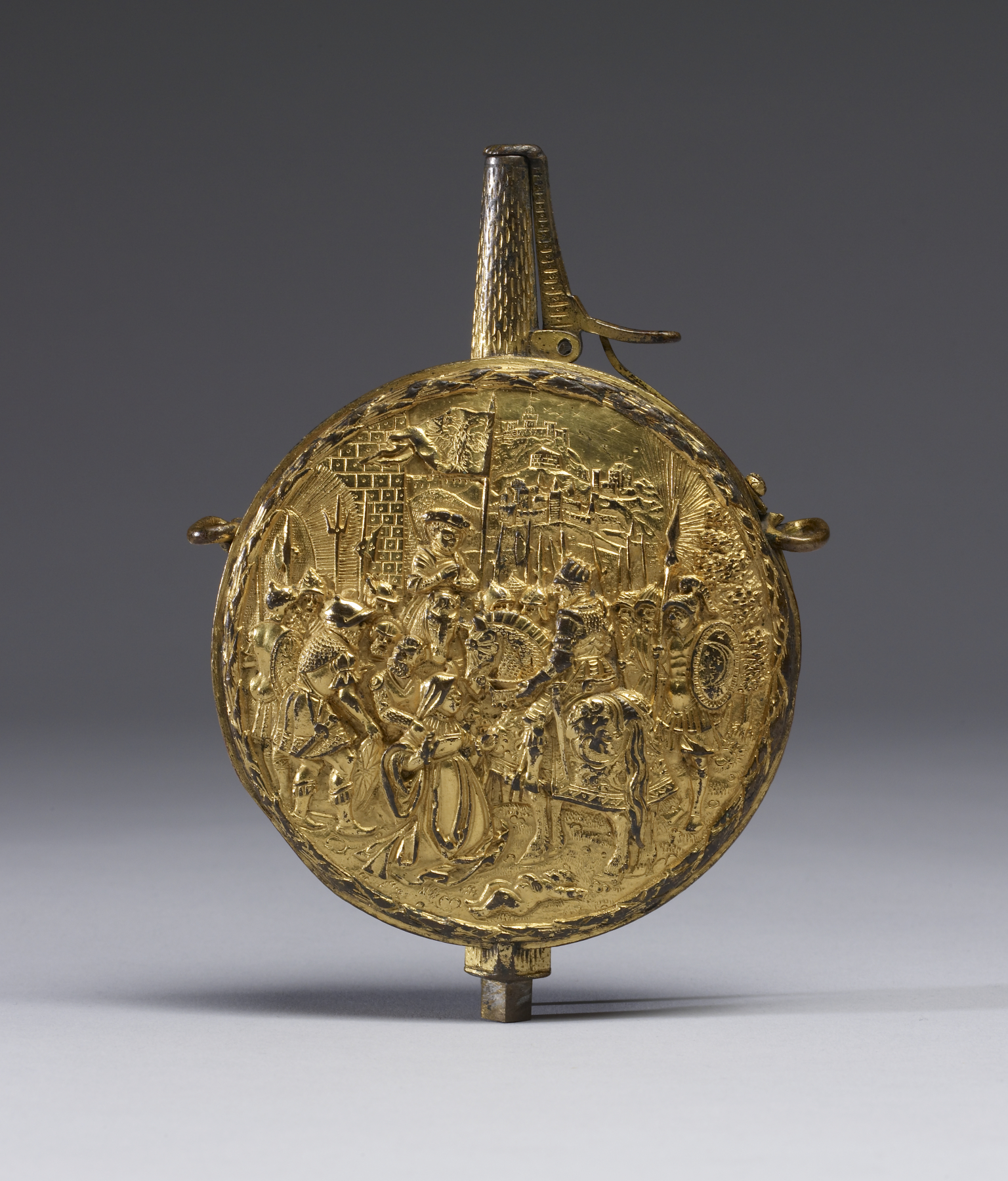
Flask for Priming Power with the Justice of Trajan (mid-16th century), depicting a woman's plea for justice from Trajan, with an imperial pennant of the Habsburgs suggesting that as Holy Roman Emperors they are the political descendants of the ancient Roman emperors (Walters Art Museum)

The designation of the Empire as "Byzantine" is a retrospective idea: it began only in 1557, a century after the fall of Constantinople, when German historian Hieronymus Wolf published his work Corpus Historiæ Byzantinæ, a collection of Byzantine sources. The term did not come in general use in the Western world before the 19th century, when modern Greece was born. The end of the continuous tradition of the Roman Empire is open to debate: the final point may be viewed as coming as early as the sack of Constantinople in 1204, or the capture of Constantinople in 1453, or as late as the abolition of the Ottoman sultanate in 1922 given the Ottoman sultans' adoption of the title of Emperor of the Romans (Kayser-i Rum) for themselves.

After the fall of Constantinople, Thomas Palaiologos, brother of the last Eastern Roman Emperor, Constantine XI, was elected emperor and tried to organize the remaining forces. His rule came to an end after the fall of the last major Byzantine city, Corinth. He then moved to Italy and continued to be recognized as Eastern emperor by the Christian powers. Other Byzantine rump states, including the Empire of Trebizond and the Principality of Theodoro, were soon conquered by the Ottomans as well.

His son Andreas Palaiologos continued claims on the Byzantine throne until he sold the title to Ferdinand II of Aragon and Isabella I of Castile before his death in 1502. However, there is no evidence that any Spanish monarch used the Byzantine imperial titles.

In Western Europe, the Roman concept of state was continued for almost a millennium by the Holy Roman Empire whose emperors, mostly of German tongue, viewed themselves as the legitimate successors to the ancient imperial tradition (King of the Romans) and Rome as the capital of its Empire. The German title of "Kaiser" is derived from the Latin name Caesar, which is pronounced [ˈkae̯sar] in Classical Latin.

The coronation of Charlemagne as "Roman" emperor by Pope Leo III in the year 800 happened at a time of unprecedented sole female imperial rule in Constantinople (by Empress Irene) which was interpreted by adversaries as tantamount to a vacancy. The imperial title in the West generated what historians have called the problem of two emperors. The emperors of the Holy Roman Empire sought in many ways to make themselves accepted by the Byzantines as their peers: with diplomatic relations, political marriages, or threats. Sometimes, however, they did not obtain the expected results, because from Constantinople they were always called "King of the Germans", never "Emperor". The Holy Roman Empire survived Byzantium, but was eventually dissolved in 1806 owing to pressure by Napoleon I.

In Eastern Europe, firstly the Bulgarian, then the Serbian, and ultimately the Russian czars (Czar derived from Caesar) proclaimed being Emperors. Muscovite Russia adopted the idea of being a Third Rome (with Constantinople being the second). Sentiments of being the heir of the fallen Eastern Roman Empire began during the reign of Ivan III, Grand Duke of Moscow, who had married Sophia Paleologina, the niece of Constantine XI (she was not the heiress of the Byzantine throne; her brother Andreas was). Being the most powerful Orthodox Christian state, the Tsars were thought of in Russia as succeeding the Eastern Roman Empire as the rightful rulers of the Orthodox Christian world. The House of Romanov, being the rulers of the Russian Empire, were finally ended in the Russian Revolution of 1917. There were also competing Bulgarian and Wallachian claims for succession of the Roman Empire.

Many of these claims were monarchist in nature, with the ethnic or national identity of the Ancient Romans never actually becoming established among the common people (poor peasants and urban workers) of these empires (except in the Byzantine Empire), the idea of succession being restricted to niche groups of intellectuals and members of the elites. Thus, when these empires were replaced by successor states that are republics (such as the Republic of Turkey, the Federal Republic of Germany and the Soviet Union and later the Russian Federation) there was an abandonment of these claims.

In the early 20th century, the Italian fascists under their "Duce" Benito Mussolini dreamed of transforming Italy back into the Roman Empire again, encompassing the Mediterranean basin. Associated with Italian fascism, Nazi Germany and Francoist Spain also connected their claims with Roman imperialism.

=== Inspiration for other empires ===
When India was a British colony, the colonial officials saw themselves as inheriting the Greco-Roman heritage, and compared their efforts in civilising India to those of the Romans in ancient Britain.

== Toponymy and ethnonymy ==
Aside from the city of Rome itself, the Imperial Roman name has survived in a number of regions and was also adopted by some of the political regimes that ruled them. These include:

- Romagna, the Italian region that was the administrative center of Byzantine Italy and thus remained associated with the Roman Empire when most of the country had fallen under Lombard rule;
- Rûm, the name by which the Seljuq Turks referred to the parts of Anatolia which they had conquered from the Eastern Roman Empire, thus the common name of the Sultanate of Rum for their realm (1077–1308). Under the Ottoman Empire after the 1390s, the Rûm Eyalet was the region around Sivas, later known simply as Eyalet of Sivas.
  - The name of the Turkish city of Erzurum has been derived from the Arabic Arḍ ar-Rūm (Arabic: ارض الروم) 'land of the Rûm'.
- Romania, a habitual reference in medieval Latin and Romance languages to the Byzantine Empire, or between 1204 and 1261 to the Latin Empire. It survived for a time in place names such as that of Nafplio, which in Italian was referred to as Napoli in Romania well into the modern era, or to this day in the Bosnian region of Romanija.
- Rumelia, the Balkan parts of the former Eastern Empire, labelled "land of the Romans" following their conquest by the Ottomans and at a time when the territories in Asia Minor formerly known as Rum were more commonly referred to again as Anatolia. Eastern Rumelia was an Ottoman autonomous province (Vilayet) that was created in the aftermath of the Russo-Turkish War as a result of the Treaty of Berlin and was located in what is today Southern Bulgaria.
- Central Greece is still known colloquially as Roúmeli (Ρούμελη).
- Romandy is the French-speaking region of western Switzerland that includes the Canton of Geneva, Canton of Jura, Canton of Neuchâtel, Canton of Vaud, and the French-speaking regions of Bernese Jura (Canton of Bern), Western Fribourg (Canton of Fribourg), and Lower Valais (Canton of Valais).
- The modern country of Romania. Romanians trace their origin to the Roman Empire's province of Roman Dacia, arguing that Roman colonization in the region gave rise to the Romanian people.
- The Aromanians, Megleno-Romanians, and Istro-Romanians, ethnicities related to the Romanians whose names originate or originated from "Roman" or similar words.

In linguistics and ethnonymy:

- The word Romance, naming the language family that also includes Spanish, Portuguese, French, Italian, and Romanian among others, is itself derived from "Roman".
- The Francophone inhabitants of Romandy are called and self-identify as Romands and whose name ultimately originates from the Latin adjective "romanus". The language Franco-Provençal, which historically has been the main language of the Romands, has occasionally been called Rommant or Romand, although most Romands now speak Swiss French instead of Franco-Provençal.
- Rûm in Asia Minor and the Middle East refers dependent on context to Byzantines and/or Orthodox Christians, namely the Rum Millet in the Ottoman Empire. Correspondingly, Orthodox Armenians are known as Hayhurum - literally, Armenian and Rûm - and Urums are Turkic-speaking Orthodox Christians in the Crimea and Georgia.
  - Romaniote Jews also derive their name from the former Eastern/Byzantine/Ottoman Empire.
- In turn, during the 16th century, Portuguese used "rume" and "rumes" (plural) as a generic term to refer to the Mamluk-Ottoman forces they faced then in the Indian Ocean.
  - Chinese authors during the Ming dynasty similarly referred to the Ottomans in general as Lumi (魯迷), derived from Rûm. During the Qing dynasty they also used the word Wulumu (務魯木).
- The Romani people, by contrast, are named after an unrelated Sanskrit root common with the Doma caste in India.

== In popular culture ==
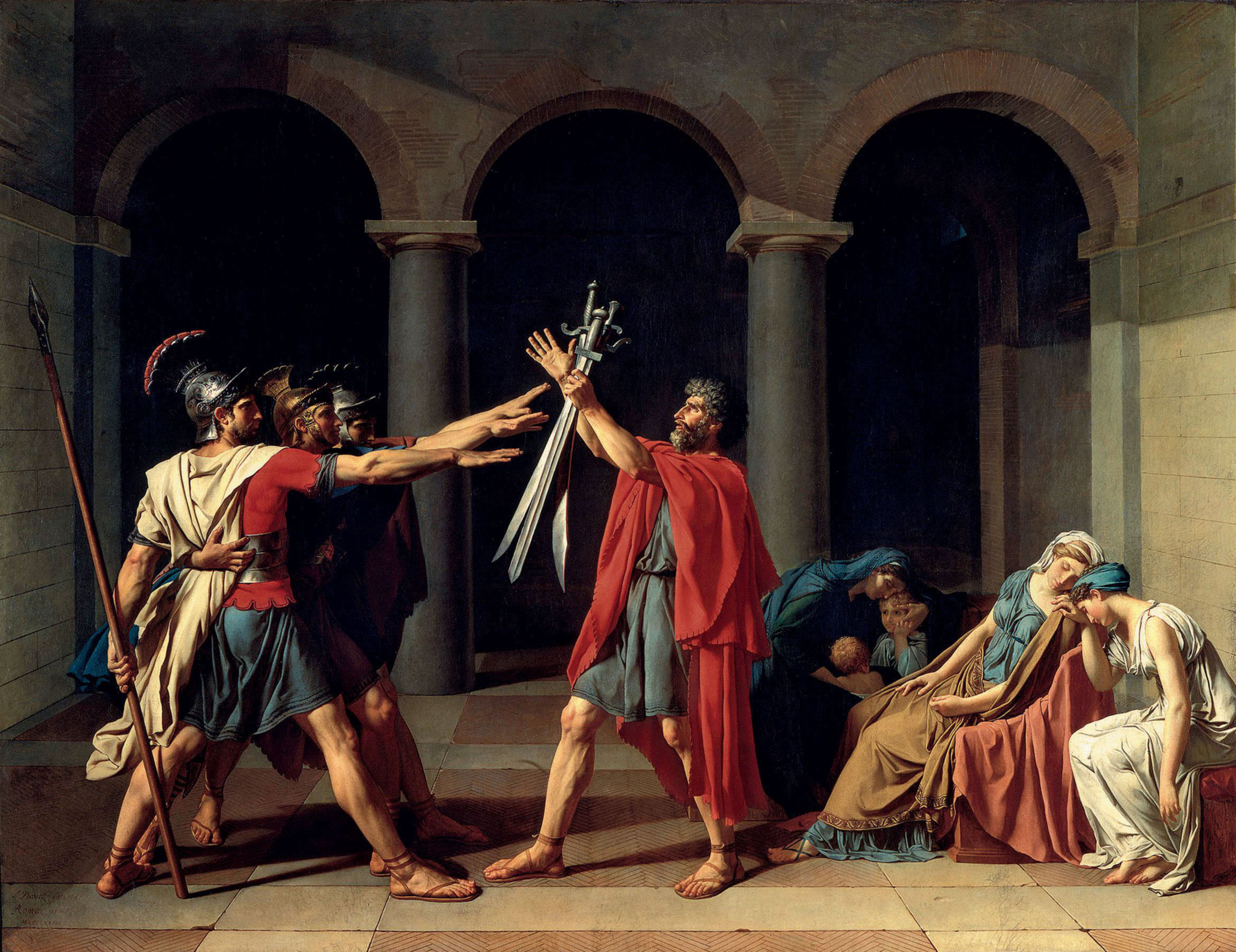
The Oath of the Horatii, by the French painter Jacques-Louis David, depicts a Roman legend about a 7th-century BC dispute between Rome and Alba Longa.

The 1979 film Monty Python's Life of Brian features a famous scene in which a revolutionary asks "what have the Romans ever done for us?", prompting the other members to incrementally add items to an increasingly lengthy series of achievements and contributions to public welfare.

In September 2023, an internet trend emerged primarily on social media app TikTok, revolving around asking men "how often do you think of the Roman Empire?" The trend originated in August 2023, stemming from an Instagram reel from a 32-year-old Swedish Roman reenactor Artur Hulu; known online as Gaius Flavius. In the reel, he declared that women are not aware of how often men think of the Roman Empire, asking the former to ask their "husband, boyfriend, father, or brother." Hulu stated that he posed the demand after noticing a gender disparity in interest in Roman Empire.

These TikToks primarily featured women asking their boyfriends how often they thought of the Roman Empire. Many of the men in these videos respond by stating that they think of it frequently, leading to shock from the women. Not all reactions from the men were universal; in one viral TikTok, when asked by his wife, one husband responds "Like the Nicki Minaj album?" likely in reference to Minaj's alter ego and her eponymous 2011 song. Another user on the app stated that she thought about the Roman Empire all the time, before positioning herself in front of a playlist of Minaj's music. In the videos, many men frequently boasted of the accomplishments of the Roman Empire, such as the size of the empire, their technological advancements such as the aqueducts, and its military prowess. Since the 16th century, Shakespeare had been adapting classical Roman history into stories about passion, patriotism and honour. Julius Caesar and Antony & Cleopatra are both set around Ancient Rome, and although there is some historical accuracy, Shakespeare took creative liberties here and there. For example, he added doublets and hats into his play even though the Romans wore togas. Movies set in ancient Rome average about one major release every 2 to 5 years. Following the massive "sword-and-sandal" era of the 1950s and 60s, the genre slowed down significantly, though recent years have seen a steady trickle of historical epics and occasional high-concept sci-fi reimaginings.

When Mount Vesuvius erupted in 79 CE, the city of Rome itself was largely spared from physical destruction, though ash clouds temporarily blanketed the region. The event primarily obliterated nearby affluent resort towns like Pompeii and Herculaneum. In the aftermath, the Roman Empire survived intact, but the disaster caused significant cultural, political, and societal shockwaves.

== See also ==
- Byzantine Empire
- Classical antiquity
- Classical tradition
- History of the Roman Empire
- Succession of the Roman Empire
- Western Roman Empire

== Sources ==
- Kuzmanović, Zorica; Mihajlović, Vladimir D. (2015). "Roman Emperors and Identity Constructions in Modern Serbia". Identities: Global Studies in Culture and Power. 22 (4): 416–432.
- Roberts, Colin H.; Skeat (1983), The Birth of the Codex, London: Oxford University Press, ISBN 0-19-726024-1
