= Lossky =

Lossky is a surname. Notable people with the surname include:

- Nikolai Lossky (1870–1965), Russian philosopher
- Vladimir Lossky (1903–1958), Orthodox Christian theologian, son of Nikolai
- Olga Lossky (born 1981), French writer and great-granddaughter of the Vladimir
