= Phyletism =

Heresy of ethnic church divisions

Phyletism or ethnophyletism (from Ancient Greek: ἔθνος, romanized: ethnos, lit. 'nation' and φυλετικός, phyletikos, 'tribal') is the principle of nationalities applied in the ecclesiastical domain: in other words, the conflation between church and nation. The term ethnophyletism designates the idea that a local autocephalous church should be based not on a local (ecclesial) criterion, but on an ethnophyletist, national or linguistic one. It was used at the Council of Constantinople of 1872 to qualify "phyletist (religious) nationalism", which was condemned as a modern ecclesial heresy: the church should not be tied with the destiny of one nation or a single race or ethnicity.

== Appearance of the term in the 19th century ==
The term phyletism was used for the first time by a synod convened by the Ecumenical Patriarchate in Constantinople, then the capital of the Ottoman Empire, in 1872 to define and condemn an alleged heretical teaching espoused by the Bulgarian Exarchate in response to the latter′s establishment as a de facto autocephaly on 23 May [O.S. 11 May] 1872, in the Bulgarian church in Constantinople in pursuance of the 12 March [O.S. 28 February] 1870 firman of Sultan Abdülaziz of the Ottoman Empire. The unilateral promulgation of the Bulgarian exarchate followed the protracted struggle of the Bulgarians against the domination of the Greek hierarchy.

In September 1872, the synod, chaired by Patriarch Anthimus VI of Constantinople, with Sophronius IV of Alexandria, Hierotheos of Antioch, Sophronios III of Cyprus, and representatives of the Church of Greece participating, issued an official condemnation (excommunication) of what it deemed to be ethnic nationalism within the church, or "ethno-phyletism", as well as its theological argumentation. In condemning "phyletism", the synod in Constantinople had, in fact, defined a basic problem of modern Eastern Orthodoxy.

== 20th and 21st centuries ==
The conditions behind latter-day phyletism are different from those surrounding the 1872 decision of the synod in Constantinople. In the latter half of the 20th century, there had been a vigorous and sometimes contentious debate among the Orthodox concerning the problem of the diaspora, specifically the organization of the Orthodox Church in countries to which Orthodox faithful had emigrated. The issue gained relevance in the wake of mass emigration of Russian refugees following the Russian Revolution of 1917, the problem being that Orthodox dioceses and larger ecclesiastical structures ("jurisdictions") in the diaspora often came to overlap, a problem especially acute in Western Europe and the United States. The result is that there are usually several Orthodox bishops of different Orthodox jurisdictions in major cities in countries outside the proper jurisdiction of a national church in spite the fact that the Ecumenical Patriarchate claims the privilege of being the only legitimate canonical authority for all Orthodox living in the diaspora on the basis of Canon 28 of the Council of Chalcedon. This situation violates the canonical principle of territoriality that each city and province should have its own unique bishop.

=== United States ===
In the United States, most Eastern Orthodox parishes as well as jurisdictions are ethnocentric, that is, focused on serving an ethnic community that has immigrated from overseas (e.g., the Greeks, Russians, Romanians, Finns, Serbs, Arabs, etc.). Many Orthodox Christians must travel long distances to find a local community church that is familiar to their ethnic background. All Orthodox churches make some attempt to accommodate those of other ethnic traditions with varying degrees of success.

In June 2008, Metropolitan Jonah of the Orthodox Church in America delivered a talk on "Episcopacy, Primacy, and the Mother Churches: A Monastic Perspective" at the Conference of the Fellowship of St. Alban and St. Sergius at St. Vladimir’s Theological Seminary.

The problem is not so much the multiple overlapping jurisdictions, each ministering to diverse elements of the population. This could be adapted as a means of dealing with the legitimate diversity of ministries within a local or national Church. The problem is that there is no common expression of unity that supersedes ethnic, linguistic and cultural divisions: there is no synod of bishops responsible for all the churches in America, and no primacy or point of accountability in the Orthodox world with the authority to correct such a situation.

Fr. Josiah Trenham noted nine divisions of pastoral practice among the Eastern Orthodox jurisdictions in the United States.

=== France ===
Philip Saliba, Archbishop of New York and Metropolitan of All North America (the Antiochian Orthodox Christian Archdiocese of North America), in 2007 pointed to Paris, France, as an example of phyletism:

One more example of phyletism is Paris, France. There are six co-existing Orthodox bishops with overlapping ecclesiological jurisdictions. In my opinion and in the opinion of Orthodox canonists, this is phyletism.

== See also ==
- Bulgarian schism
- Cuius regio, eius religio
- Day Of Slavonic Alphabet, Bulgarian Enlightenment and Culture
- Ethnic religion
- Kinism
- Messianic Judaism, an ethnically defined denomination of Evangelical Protestantism
- Moscow–Constantinople schism (2018)
- National church
- Uranopolitism
