= Dialects of Serbo-Croatian =

Dialects of South Slavic language

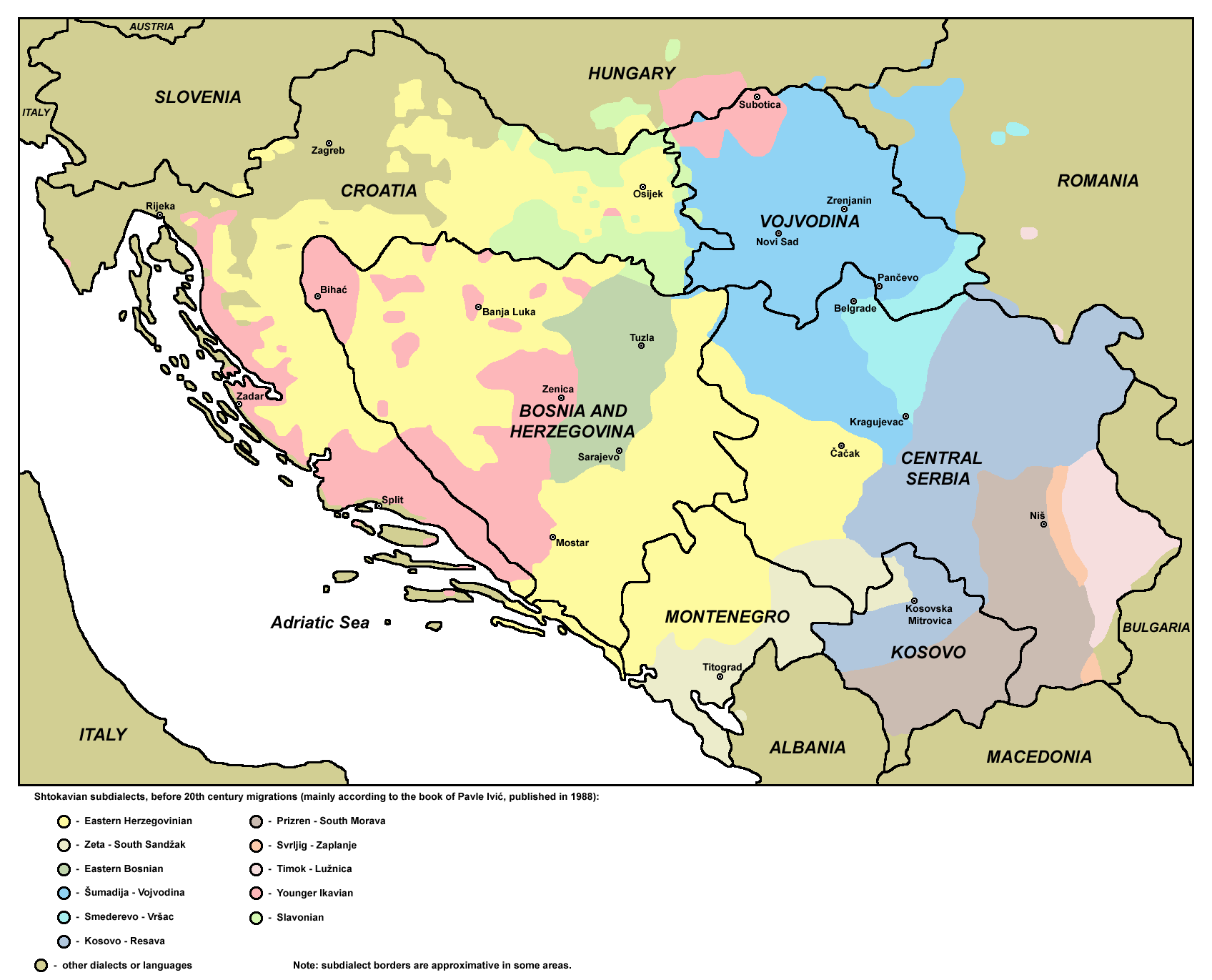
Map of Shtokavian subdialects prior to the 20th-century migrations. Eastern Herzegovinian subdialect, shown in yellow, forms the basis of all standard varieties of Serbo-Croatian.

The dialects of Serbo-Croatian include the vernacular forms and standardized sub-dialect forms of Serbo-Croatian as a whole or as part of its standard varieties: Bosnian, Croatian, Montenegrin, and Serbian. They are part of the dialect continuum of South Slavic languages that joins through the transitional Torlak dialects and the Macedonian dialects to the south, Bulgarian dialects to the southeast and Slovene dialects to the northwest.

The division of South Slavic dialects into "Slovene", "Serbo-Croatian" (or "Bosnian", "Croatian", "Montenegrin" and "Serbian"), "Macedonian" and "Bulgarian" is mostly based on political grounds: for example, all dialects within modern Slovenia are classified as "Slovene", despite some of them historically originating from other regions, while all dialects in modern Croatia are classified as "Croatian" (or "Croato-Serbian" before 1990) despite not forming a coherent linguistic entity (and some are proven to originate from parts of what is today Slovenia). Therefore, "Serbo-Croatian dialects" are simply South Slavic dialects in countries where a variant of Serbo-Croatian is used as the standard language. However, in broad terms, the Eastern South Slavic dialects differ most from the Western South Slavic dialects.

The primary dialects are named after the most common question word for what: Shtokavian (štokavski) uses the pronoun što or šta, Chakavian (čakavski) uses ča or ca, and Kajkavian (kajkavski) uses kaj or kej. The pluricentric Serbo-Croatian standard language and all four contemporary standard variants are based on the Eastern Herzegovinian subdialect of Neo-Shtokavian. The other dialects are not taught in schools or used by the state media. The Torlak dialect is often added to the list, though sources usually note that it is a transitional dialect between Shtokavian and the Bulgaro-Macedonian dialects. Burgenland Croatian and Molise Slavic are varieties of the Chakavian dialect spoken outside the South Slavic dialect continuum, which combine influences from other dialects of Serbo-Croatian as well as influences from the dominantly spoken local languages.

Another frequently-noted distinction among the dialects is made through the reflex of the long Common Slavic vowel jat; the dialects are divided along Ikavian, Ekavian, and Ijekavian isoglosses, with the reflects of jat being /i/, /e/, and /ije/ or /je/ respectively.

== Main dialects ==
=== Shtokavian dialects ===
==== History ====
The Proto-Shtokavian idiom appeared in the 12th century. In the following century or two, Shtokavian was divided into two zones: western, which covered the major part of Bosnia and Herzegovina and Slavonia in Croatia, and eastern, dominant in easternmost Bosnia and Herzegovina and greater parts of Montenegro and Serbia. Western Shtokavian was principally characterized by a three-accentual system, while Eastern Shtokavian was marked by a two-accentual system. According to research of historical linguistics, Old-Shtokavian was well established by the mid-15th century. In this period, it was still being mixed with Church Slavonic to varying degrees, as geographically transitory to Chakavian and Kajkavian dialects spoken on the territory of today's Croatia, with which it had constituted a natural dialect continuum.

==== Distribution and subdialects ====
Originally, the dialect covered a significantly smaller area than it covers today, meaning that the Štokavian speech had spread for the last five centuries, overwhelmingly at the expense of Čakavian and Kajkavian idioms. Modern areal distribution of these three dialects as well as their internal stratification (Štokavian and Čakavian in particular) is primarily a result of the migrations resulting from the spread of Ottoman Empire on the Balkans. Migratory waves were particularly strong in the 16th–18th century, bringing about large-scale linguistic and ethnic changes on the Central South Slavic area (See: Great Migrations of the Serbs).

By far the most numerous, mobile and expansionist migrations were those of Ijekavian Štokavian speakers of eastern Herzegovina, who have flooded most of Western Serbia, many areas of eastern and western Bosnia, and large swathes of Croatia (Banovina, Kordun, Lika, parts of Gorski Kotar, continental parts of northern Dalmatia, some places north of Kupa, parts of Slavonia, southeastern Baranya etc.). This is why the Eastern Herzegovinian dialect is the most spoken Serbo-Croatian dialect today, and why it bears a name that is only descriptive of its area of origin. These migrations also played a pivotal role in the spread of Neo-Štokavian innovations.

The Shtokavian dialect spoken by Croats has more dialects: there is the innovative new Shtokavian dialect ikavian as it is spoken in west Herzegovina, Dalmatian Hinterland, Lika, parts of Velebit area and in some places of Gorski Kotar, Vojvodina, Bačka and in neighboring Hungarian areas. New Shtokavian is spoken by Croats in east Herzegovina, more recently in the Dubrovnik area and in many places of the former Military Frontier.

The Shtokavian dialect is divided into Old Shtokavian and Neo-Shtokavian subdialects. Subdialects grouped under Old-Shtokavian are the following:

- Slavonian dialect (also called Archaic Šćakavian);
- East Bosnian dialect (also called Jekavian-Šćakavian);
- Zeta–South Raška dialect (also called Đekavian-Ijekavian);
- Kosovo–Resava dialect (also called Older Ekavian);
- Prizren–Timok dialect (also called Old-Serbian).

Neo-Shtokavian dialects comprise the following subdialects:

- Bosnian–Dalmatian dialect (also called Western Ikavian, Bunjevac dialect, or Younger Ikavian);
- Bunjevac dialect (also called Younger Ikavian, Bosnian-Dalmatian, or Western Ikavian);
- Dubrovnik dialect (also called Western Ijekavian);
- Eastern Herzegovinian dialect (also called Neo-Ijekavian);
- Užican dialect (also called Zlatibor dialect);
- Šumadija–Vojvodina dialect (also called Younger Ekavian);
- Smederevo–Vršac dialect.

==== Characteristics ====
Shtokavian has a number of characteristic historical sound changes, accentual changes, changes in inflection, morphology and syntax. Some of these isoglosses are not exclusive and have also been shared by neighboring dialects, and some of them have only overwhelmingly but not completely been spread on the whole Štokavian area. The differences between Štokavian and the neighboring Eastern South Slavic dialects of Bulgaria and North Macedonia are clear and largely shared with other Western South Slavic dialects, while the differences to the neighboring Western South Slavic dialect of Čakavian and Kajkavian are much more fluid in character, and the mutual influence of various subdialects and idioms play a more prominent role.

General characteristics of Štokavian are the following:

- što or šta as the demonstrative/interrogative pronoun;
- differentiation between two short (in addition to two or three long) accents, rising and falling, though not in all Štokavian speakers;
- preservation of unaccented length, but not consistently across all speeches;
- /u/ as the reflex of Common Slavic back nasal vowel /ǫ/ as well as the syllabic /l/ (with the exception of central Bosnia where a diphthongal /uo/ is also recorded as a reflex);
- initial group of v- + weak semivowel yields u- (e.g. unuk < Common Slavic *vъnukъ);
- schwa resulting from the jer merger yields /a/, with the exception of Zeta-South Sandžak dialect;
- metathesis of vьse to sve;
- čr- > cr-, with the exception of Slavonian, Molise and Vlachia (Gradišće) dialect;
- word-final -l changes to /o/ or /a/; the exception is verbal adjective in the Slavonian southwest;
- d' > /dʑ/ (<đ>) with numerous exceptions
- cr > tr in the word trešnja ("cherry"); some exceptions in Slavonia, Hungary and Romania;
- /ć/ and /đ/ from jt, jd (e.g. poći, pođem); exceptions in Slavonian and Eastern Bosnian dialect;
- so-called "new iotation" of dentals and labials, with many exceptions, especially in Slavonia and Bosnia;
- general loss of phoneme /x/, with many exceptions;
- ending -ā in genitive plural of masculine and feminine nouns, with many exceptions;
- ending -u in locative singular of masculine and neuter nouns (e.g. u gradu, u m(j)estu);
- infix -ov- / -ev- in the plural of most monosyllabic masculine nouns, with many exceptions (e.g. in the area between Neretva and Dubrovnik);
- syncretism of dative, locative and instrumental plural of nouns, with many exceptions;
- preservation of ending -og(a) in genitive and accusative singular of masculine and neuter gender if pronominal-adjectival declension (e.g. drugoga), with exceptions on the area of Dubrovnik and Livno;
- special form with the ending -a for the neuter gender in nominative plural of pronominal-adjectival declension (e.g. ova m(j)esta and no ove m(j)esta);
- preservation of aorist, which is however missing in some areas (e.g. around Dubrovnik);
- special constructs reflecting old dual for numerals 2–4 (dva, tri, četiri stola);
- many so-called "Turkisms" (turcizmi) or "Orientalisms", i.e. words borrowed from Ottoman Turkish.

As can be seen from the list, many of these isoglosses are missing from certain Štokavian idioms, just as many of them are shared with neighboring non-Štokavian dialects.

=== Chakavian dialects ===
==== History ====
Chakavian is the oldest written Serbo-Croatian dialect that had made a visible appearance in legal documents – as early as 1275 ("Istrian land survey") and 1288 ("Vinodol codex"), the predominantly vernacular Chakavian is recorded, mixed with elements of Church Slavic. Archaic Chakavian can be traced back to 1105 in the Baška tablet. All these and other early Chakavian texts up to the 17th century are mostly written in Glagolitic alphabet.

==== Distribution and subdialects ====
Distribution of the Chakavian dialect at the end of the 20th century

Initially, the Chakavian dialect covered a much wider area than today including about two thirds of medieval Croatia: the major part of central and southern Croatia southwards of Kupa and westwards of Una river, as well as western and southwestern Bosnia and Herzegovina. During and after the Ottoman intrusion and subsequent warfare (15th–18th centuries), the Chakavian area has become greatly reduced; on the Croatian mainland, it has recently been almost entirely replaced by Shtokavian, so it is now spoken in a much smaller coastal area.

Chakavian is now mostly reduced in southwestern Croatia along the eastern Adriatic: Adriatic islands, and sporadically in the mainland coast, with rare inland enclaves up to central Croatia, and minor enclaves in Austria and Montenegro.

- The majority of Adriatic islands are Chakavian, except the easternmost ones (Mljet and Elafiti); and easternmost areas of Hvar and Brač, as well as the area around the town of Korčula on the island of Korčula.
- Its largest mainland area is the subentire Istria peninsula, and Kvarner littoral and islands; minor coastal enclaves occur sporadically in the Dalmatian mainland around Zadar, Biograd, Split, and in Pelješac peninsula.
- Within the Croatian inland, its major area is the Gacka valley, and minor enclaves occur in Pokupje valley and Žumberak hills, northwards around Karlovac.
- Chakavians outside Croatia: minor enclave of Bigova (Trašte) at Boka Kotorska in Montenegro, the mixed Čičarija dialect in Slovenia, refugees from the Turks in Burgenland (eastern Austria) and southwestern Slovakia, and recent emigrants in North America (chiefly in New Orleans, Los Angeles, and Vancouver).

The Chakavian dialect comprises the following subdialects:

- Buzet dialect;
- Middle Chakavian;
- Northern Chakavian;
- Southern Chakavian;
- Southeastern Chakavian;
- Southwest Istrian.

==== Characteristics ====
There is no generally accepted opinion on the set of characteristics a dialect has to possess to be classified as Chakavian (rather than its admixture with Shtokavian or Kajkavian), but the following characteristics are most commonly proposed:

- interrogatory pronoun is "ča" or "zač" (in some islands also "ca" or "zace");
- old accentuation and 3 accents (mostly in ultima or penultima);
- phonological features that yield /a/ for Old Slavic phonemes in characteristic positions: "language" is jazik (or zajik) in Chakavian and jezik in Shtokavian;
- "j" replacing the Shtokavian "đ" (dj): for "between", Chakavian meju, Shtokavian među;
- "m" shifts to "n" at the end of words: standard Croatian volim ("I love"), sam ("I am"), selom ("village" – Instrumental case) become Chakavian volin, san, selon;
- in conditional occur specific prefixes: bin-, biš-, bimo-, bite-, bis;
- contracted or lacking aorist tense;
- some subdialects on island of Pag have kept the archaic form of imperfect.

Besides the usual Chakavian (with typical pronoun "ča"), in some Adriatic islands and in eastern Istra another special variant is also spoken which lacks most palatals, with other parallel deviations called "tsakavism" (cakavizam):

- palatal "č" is replaced by the sibilant "ts" (c): pronouns ca and zac (or ce and zace);
- palatals š (sh) and ž (zh) are replaced by sibilants s and z (or transitive sj and zj);
- đ (dj), lj and nj are replaced by the simple d, l and n (without iotation);
- frequent diphthongs instead of simple vowels: o > uo, a > oa, e > ie, etc.;
- Yat (jat): longer y (= ue) exists in addition to the usual short i (or e);
- appurtenance is often noted by possessive dative (rarely adjective nor genitive);
- vocative is mostly lacking and replaced by a nominative in appellating construction;
- auxiliary particles are always before the main verb: se- (self), bi- (if), će- (be).

The largest area of tsakavism is in eastern Istra at Labin, Rabac and a dozen nearby villages; minor mainland enclaves are the towns Bakar and Trogir. Tsakavism is also frequent in Adriatic islands: part of Lošinj and nearby islets, Baška in Krk, Pag town, the western parts of Brač (Milna), Hvar town, and subentire Vis with adjacent islets.

=== Kajkavian dialects ===
==== History ====
Dialectogical investigations of the Kajkavian dialect had begun at the end of the 19th century: the first comprehensive monograph was written in Russian by Ukrainian philologist A. M. Lukjanenko in 1905 (Kajkavskoe narečie). Kajkavian is not only a folk dialect, but in the course of history of Serbo-Croatian it has been the written public language (along with the corpus written in Čakavian and Štokavian). Kajkavian was the last to appear on the scene, mainly due to economic and political reasons. Although the first truly vernacular Serbo-Croatian texts (i.e. not mixed with Church Slavonic) go back to the 13th century (Chakavian) and to the 14th century (Shtokavian), the first Kajkavian published work was Ivanuš Pergošić's "Decretum" from 1574. In the following centuries, numerous works appeared in Serbo-Croatian Kajkavian literary language.

Kajkavian literary language gradually fell into disuse since the Croatian National Revival, ca. 1830–1850, when leaders of the Croatian National Unification Movement (the majority of them being Kajkavian native speakers themselves) adopted the most widespread and developed Serbo-Croatian Shtokavian literary language as the basis for the Croatian standard language. However, after a period of lethargy, the 20th century witnessed new flourishing of literature in Kajkavian dialect – this time as Croatian dialectal poetry, with the main authors being Antun Gustav Matoš, Miroslav Krleža, Ivan Goran Kovačić, Dragutin Domjanić, Nikola Pavić, etc. Nowadays, Kajkavian lexical treasure is being published by the Croatian Academy of Sciences and Arts in "Rječnik hrvatskoga kajkavskoga književnoga jezika" (Dictionary of the Croatian Kajkavian Literary Language, 8 volumes, 1999).

==== Distribution and subdialects ====
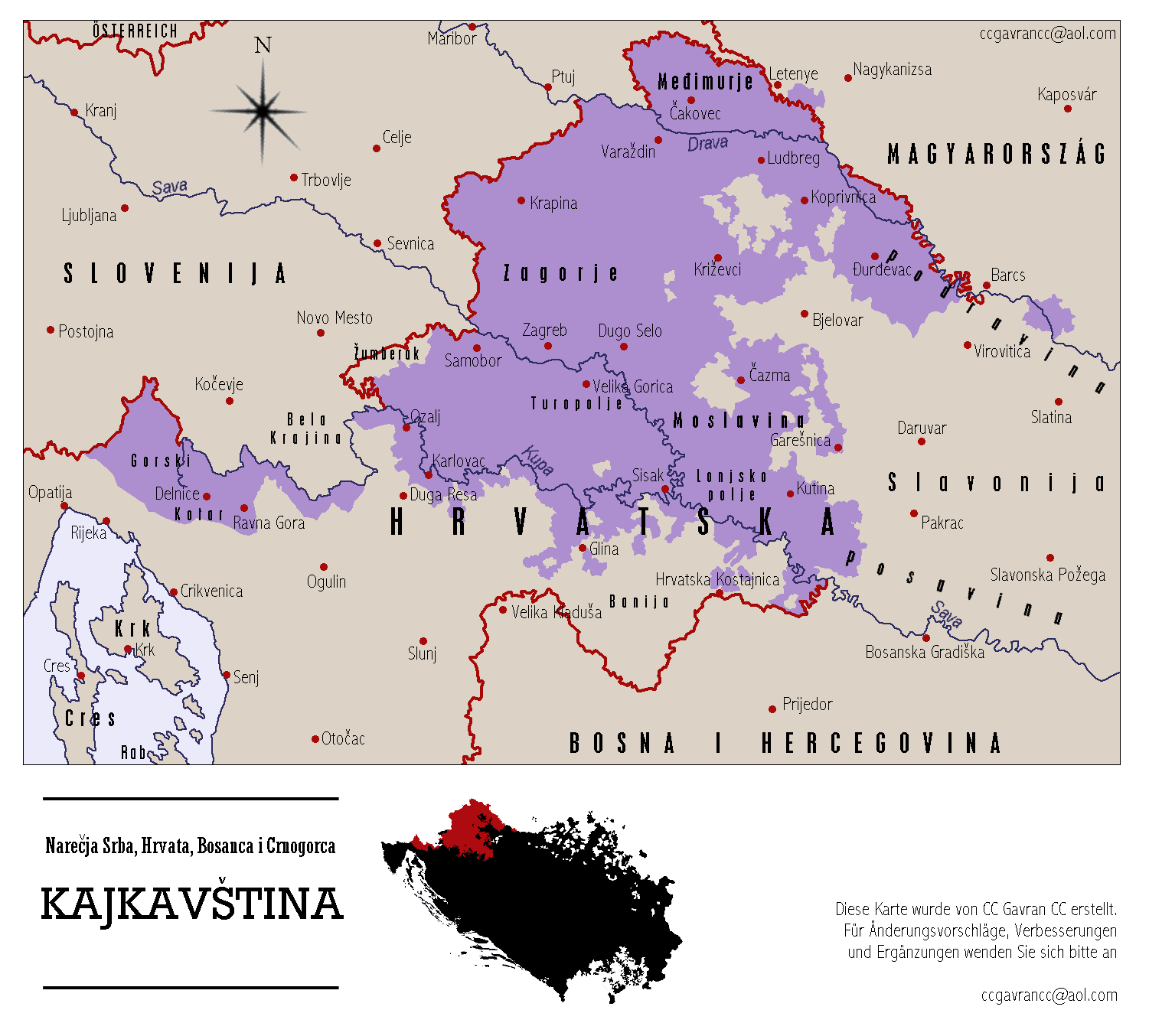
Distribution of the Kajkavian dialect in modern Croatia

Kajkavian is spoken in North Croatia, including the capital Zagreb, as well as in a few enclaves in Austria, Hungary, and Romania. Though its speakers are ethnic Croats, and Kajkavian is thus generally considered a dialect of Serbo-Croatian, it is closer to neighboring Slovene than it is to Chakavian or Shtokavian. The Kajkavian area of Croatia is bordered on the northwest by Slovene language territory. It is bordered on the east and southeast by Shtokavian dialects roughly along a line that was the former division between Civil Croatia and the Habsburg Military Frontier; in the southwest, along the Kupa and Dobra rivers, it persisted in ancient (medieval) contact with Chakavian dialects.

The major cities in northern Croatia with prevailing urban Kajkavians are chiefly: Zagreb (old central city, Sesvete and V. Gorica), Koprivnica, Krapina, Križevci, Varaždin, Čakovec, etc. The typical and archaic Kajkavian is today spoken chiefly in Zagorje hills and Medjimurje plain, and in adjacent areas of northwestern Croatia where other immigrants and Štokavian standard had much less influence. The most peculiar Kajkavian archidiom (Baegnunski) is spoken at Bednja in northernmost Croatia. The mixed half-Kajkavian towns along the eastern and southern edge of Kajkavian-speaking area are Pitomača, Čazma, Kutina, Popovača, Sunja, Petrinja, Ozalj, Ogulin, Fužine, and Čabar, with included newer Štokavian enclaves of Bjelovar, Sisak, Glina, Dubrava, Zagreb and Novi Zagreb. The southernmost Kajkavian villages are Krapje at Jasenovac; and Pavušek, Dvorišče and Hrvatsko selo in Zrinska Gora.

Kajkavian dialects have been classified along various criteria. In 1927, Serbian philologist Aleksandar Belić divided the Kajkavian dialect according to the reflexes of Proto-Slavic phonemes /tj/ and /DJ/ into three subdialects: eastern, northwestern, and southwestern. However, later investigations have not corroborated Belić's division. Contemporary Kajkavian dialectology originates mainly from Croatian philologist Stjepan Ivšić's work "Jezik Hrvata kajkavaca" ("The Language of Kajkavian Croats") in 1936, which is based on accentuation characteristics. Due to the great diversity of Kajkavian speech—primarily in phonetics, phonology and morphology—the Kajkavian dialectological atlas is notable for its bewildering proliferation of subdialects: anywhere from the four identified by Ivšić, up to six proposed by Croatian linguist Dalibor Brozović (a formerly accepted division), and even as many as fifteen, according to a monograph authored by Croatian linguist Mijo Lončarić (1995).

The most commonly accepted division of Kajkavian dialect lists the following subdialects:

- Zagorje–Međimurje;
- Turopolje-Posavina;
- Križevci-Podravina;
- Prigorje;
- Lower Sutlan;
- Goran.

==== Characteristics ====
Kajkavian is closely related to Slovene and Prekmurje Slovene in particular. The speakers of Prekmurje Slovene are Slovenes and Hungarian Slovenes who belonged to the Archdiocese of Zagreb during the Habsburg era. Higher amounts of correspondences between the two exist in inflection and vocabulary. Some Kajkavian words also bear a closer resemblance to other Slavic languages (such as Russian) than they do to Shtokavian or Chakavian.

For instance, gda (also seen as shorter "da") seems to be at first glance unrelated to kada, however, when compared to Russian когда, Slovene kdaj, or Prekmurje Slovene gda, kda, the relationship becomes apparent. Kajkavian kak (how) and tak (so) are exactly like their Russian cognates and in turn like Prekmurje Slovene in turn tak, kak) compared to Štokavian, Čakavian, and standard Slovene kako and tako. This vowel loss occurred in most other Slavic languages; Shtokavian is a notable exception, whereas the same feature of Macedonian is probably not a Serbian influence, because the word is preserved in the same form in Bulgarian, to which Macedonian is much more closely related than to Serbian.

Another distinctive feature of Kajkavian is the use of another future tense. Instead of Shtokavian and Chakavian future I ("ću", "ćeš", and "će" + infinitive), Kajkavian speakers use future II ("bum", "buš" and "bu" + active verbal adjective). Future II in Standard Croatian can only be used in subordinate clauses to refer to a condition or an action which will occur before other future action. For example, the phrase "I'll show you" is "Ti bum pokazal" in Kajkavian whereas in standard Croatian it is "Pokazat ću ti". This is a feature shared with Slovene: bom, boš, bo.

=== Comparative analysis ===
The Serbo-Croatian dialects differ not only in the question word they are named after, but also heavily in phonology, accentuation and intonation, case endings and tense system (morphology) and basic vocabulary. In the past, Chakavian and Kajkavian dialects were spoken on a much larger territory, but have subsequently been replaced by Štokavian during the period of migrations caused by Ottoman Turkish conquest of the Balkans in the 15th and 16th centuries. These migrations caused the koinéisation of the Shtokavian dialects, that used to form the West Shtokavian (more closer and transitional towards the neighbouring Chakavian and Kajkavian dialects) and East Shtokavian (transitional towards the Torlak and the whole Bulgaro-Macedonian area) dialect bundles, and their subsequent spread at the expense of Chakavian and Kajkavian. As a result, Štokavian now covers an area larger than all the other dialects combined and continues to make its progress in the enclaves where subliterary dialects are still being spoken.

The main bundle of isoglosses separates Kajkavian and Slovenian dialects on the one hand from Štokavian and Čakavian on the other. These are:

- long falling accent of newer origin (neocircumflex);
- development of the consonant group rj (as opposed to consonant /r/) from former soft /r'/ before a vowel (e.g. morjem, zorja);
- reflexes of /o/ or /ọ/ of the old Common Slavic nasal vowel /ǫ/, and not /u/;
- inflectional morpheme -o (as opposed to -ojo) in the instrumental singular of a-declension.

Other characteristics distinguishing Kajkavian from Štokavian, beside the demonstrative/interrogatory pronoun kaj (as opposed to što/šta used in Štokavian), are:

- a reflex of old semivowels of /ẹ/ (e.g. dẹn < Common Slavic *dьnь, pẹs < Common Slavic *pьsъ); closed /ẹ/ appearing also as a jat reflex;
- retention of word-final -l (e.g. došel, as opposed to Štokavian došao);
- word-initial u- becoming v- (e.g. vuho, vuzel, vozek);
- dephonemicization of affricates /č/ and /ć/ to some form of middle value;
- genitive plural of masculine nouns has the morpheme -of / -ef;
- syncretized dative, locative and instrumental plural has the ending -ami;
- the ending -me in the first-person plural present (e.g. vidime);
- affix š in the formation of adjectival comparatives (e.g. debleši, slabeši);
- supine;
- future tense formation in the form of bom/bum došel, došla, došlo.

Characteristics distinguishing Čakavian from Štokavian, beside the demonstrative/interrogatory pronoun ča, are:

- preservation of polytonic three-accent system;
- vocalization of weak jers (e.g. malin/melin < Common Slavic *mъlinъ; cf. Štokavian mlin);
- vowel /a/ as opposed to /e/ after palatal consonants /j/, /č/, /ž/ (e.g. Čk. jazik/zajik: Št. jezik, Čk. počati: Št. početi, Čk. žaja: Št. želja);
- the appearance of extremely palatal /t'/ or /ć'/ (< earlier /t'/) and /j/ (< earlier /d'/) either in free positions or in groups št', žd';
- depalatalization of /n'/ and /l'/;
- /ž/ instead of /dʒ/ (cf. Čk. žep: Št. džep);
- /č/ > /š/ (cf. Čk. maška: Št. mačka);
- word-initial consonant groups čr-, čri-, čre- (cf. Čk. črivo/črevo: Št. cr(ij)evo, Čk. črn: Št. crn);
- conditional mood with biš in the 2nd-person singular;
- non-syncretized dative, locative and instrumental plural.

== Torlak dialects ==
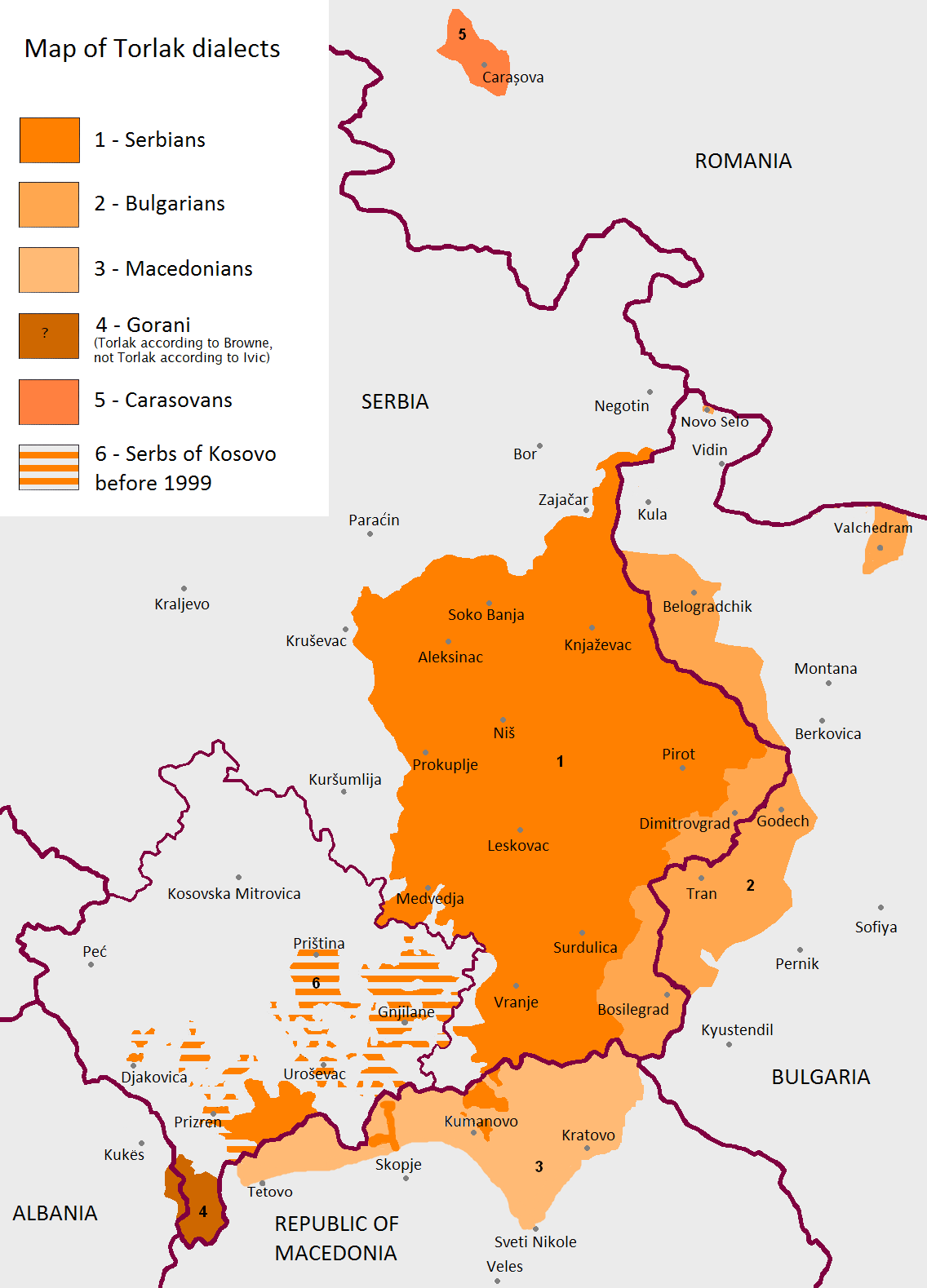
Distribution of the Torlak dialects

The Torlak dialects are intermediate between the Eastern and Western branches of South Slavic, and have been variously described, in whole or in parts, as belonging to either group. In the 19th century, their classification was hotly contested between Serbian and Bulgarian writers.Most Serbian linguists, like Pavle Ivić (and Bosnian linguist Asim Peco) classify Torlak as an Old-Shtokavian dialect, referring to it as Prizren-Timok dialect. However, this opinion was not shared by the Croatian linguists and thus, Milan Rešetar classified the Torlak dialects (which he called Svrlijg) as a different group from Shtokavian.

Many old Bulgarian scientists, such as Benyo Tsonev, Gavril Zanetov and Krste Misirkov, classified Torlak as a dialect of Bulgarian: they noted the manner of the articles, the loss of most of the cases, etc. More recent Bulgarian linguists (including Stoyko Stoykov and Rangel Bozhkov) also classify Torlak as a "Belogradchik-Tran" dialect of Bulgarian, and claim that it should be classified outside the Shtokavian area. Stoykov further argued that the Torlak dialects having a grammar that is closer to Bulgarian was indicative of them being originally Bulgarian.

In Macedonian dialectology, the Torlak varieties spoken on Macedonian territory (Kumanovo, Kratovo and Kriva Palanka dialects) are classified as part of a North-Eastern group of Macedonian dialects.

The Torlak dialects, together with Bulgarian and Macedonian, display many properties of the Balkan linguistic area, a set of structural convergence features shared also with other languages of the Balkans, such as Albanian and Aromanian. In terms of areal linguistics, they have therefore been described as part of a prototypical "Balkan Slavic" area, as opposed to other parts of Serbo-Croatian, which are only peripherally involved in the convergence area.

== Other varieties ==
=== Burgenland Croatian ===
Burgenland Croatian (gradišćanskohrvatski jezik) is a regional variety of the Chakavian dialect spoken in Austria, Hungary, the Czech Republic and Slovakia. It is recognized as a minority language in the Austrian state of Burgenland where it is spoken by 19,412 people according to official reports (2001).

This variety was the language of Croatian refugees who fled Croatia during the Turkish Wars and settled in the western part of what was then Hungary, the area where they still live. Burgenland Croats included speakers of all three dialects of Croatian (Shtokavian, Chakavian and Kajkavian), with the majority being the Chakavians who originally came from the northern Adriatic coast. Burgenland Croats did not take part in the shaping of the present Croatian standard language in the 19th century. Instead, they constructed their own written standard based mainly on the local Chakavian speech and adopted the Croatian alphabet, a modified Latin alphabet, as their script.

It is still a matter of debate whether Burgenland Croatian should be classified as a Slavic micro-language of its own. Burgenland Croatian dialects are mostly viewed as isolated dialects of Croatian. Burgenland Croatian and the Prekmurje Slovene of Slovene (spoken in Prekmurje and Hungary) was to press with interact. The first Prekmurje Slovene works (for example, the "Old hymn-book of Martjanci") was applied to the Burgenland Croatian books. A few writers of the Prekmurje Slovene were of Burgenland Croatian descent (such as Jakab Szabár) and also Burgenland Croatian (such as József Ficzkó).

The variety uses the Latin alphabet with the same diacritical modifiers as the Croatian alphabet. In the course of language development, it acquired some of its own specialised vocabulary, sometimes different from that used in standard Croatian (sampled differences from standard Croatian are presented in the table). Burgenland Croatian written language is based mainly on the local Chakavian speech with some influences from the other Croatian dialects spoken in Burgenland, which are categorized as Southern Chakavian, Central Chakavian and Western Ikavian.

Sample of differences between Standard and Burgenland Croatian
| English | Standard Croatian | Burgenland Croatian |
|---|---|---|
| black | crna | črna |
| diver | ronilac | ronilac |
| word | riječ | rič |
| Jesus Christ | Isus Krist | Jezuš Kristuš |
| squash | buča | tikva, tikvica |
| floor | dno | tlo |
| village, settlement | selo, mjesto, naselje | selo |
| rural | seoski, mjesni | seoski |
| lower | donji | dolnji |

=== Molise Slavic ===
Molise Slavic or Slavomolisano is a variety of the Shtokavian dialect with some Chakavian influences spoken in the province of Campobasso, in the Molise Region of southern Italy, in the villages of Montemitro (Mundimitar), Acquaviva Collecroce (Živavoda Kruč) and San Felice del Molise (Štifilić). There are fewer than 1,000 active speakers and fewer than 2,000 passive speakers. The language has been preserved since a group of Croats emigrated from Dalmatia abreast of advancing Ottoman Turks. The residents of these villages speak a Chakavian dialect with an Ikavian accent. The Molise Croats, however, consider themselves to be Italians who speak a Slavic language, rather than ethnic Slavs. Some speakers call themselves Zlavi or Harvati and call their language simply na našo ("our language").

The language was preserved until today only in the aforementioned three villages, although several villages in the Molise and Abruzzo regions are aware of their Slavic and Croat ancestry. The existence of this Croat colony was unknown outside Italy until 1855 when Medo Pucić, a linguist from Dubrovnik, during one of his journeys in Italy overheard a tailor in Naples speaking with his wife in a language very similar to Pucić's own. The tailor then told him that he came from the village of Kruč, then part of the Kingdom of the Two Sicilies. Subsequently, the Gajica, the modern Croatian alphabet, was adopted to the language.

The language is highly Italianized and also retains many archaic features. Because the colony was established before the European discovery of the Americas, all the names of animals and plants introduced from the Americas are borrowed from Italian or created. Along with these, Molise Slavic features the following characteristics:

- The analytic do + genitive replaces the synthetic independent genitive. In Italian it is del- + noun, since Italian has lost all its cases.
- do superseded od.
- Slavic verb aspect is preserved, except in the past tense imperfective verbs are attested only in the Slavic imperfect (bihu, "they were"), and perfective verbs only in the perfect (je izaša, "he has come out"). There is no colloquial imperfect in the modern West South Slavic languages. Italian has aspect in the past tense that works in a similar fashion (impf. portava, "he was carrying", versus perf. ha portato, "he has carried").
- Slavic conjunctions superseded by Italian or local ones: ke, "what" (Cr. što, also ke – Cr. da, "that", It. che); e, oš, "and" (Cr. i, It. e); ma, "but" (Cr. ali, no, It. ma); se, "if" (Cr. ako, It. se).
- An indefinite article is in regular use: na, often written 'na, possibly derived from earlier jedna ("one"), via Italian una.
- Structural changes in genders. Notably, njevog does not agree with the possessor's gender (Cr. njegov or njezin, "his or her"). Italian suo and its forms likewise does not, but with the object's gender instead.
- As in Italian, the perfective enclitic is tightly bound to the verb and always stands before it: je izaša, "is let loose" (Cr. facul. je izašao or izašao je), Italian è rilasciato.

== Division by jat reflex ==
A basic distinction among the dialects is in the reflex of the long Common Slavic vowel jat, usually transcribed as *ě. Depending on the reflex, the dialects are divided into Ikavian, Ekavian, and Ijekavian, with the reflects of jat being /i/, /e/, and /ije/ or /je/ respectively. The long and short jat is reflected as long or short */i/ and /e/ in Ikavian and Ekavian, but Ijekavian dialects introduce a ije/je alternation to retain a distinction.

Standard Croatian and Bosnian are based on Ijekavian, whereas Serbian uses both Ekavian and Ijekavian forms (Ijekavian for Montenegrin, Croatian and Bosnian Serbs; Ekavian for most of Serbia). Influence of standard language through state media and education has caused non-standard varieties to lose ground to the literary forms.

The jat-reflex rules are not without exception. For example, when short jat is preceded by r, in most Ijekavian dialects developed into /re/ or, occasionally, /ri/. The prefix prě- ("trans-" or "over-") when long became pre- in eastern Ijekavian dialects but to prije- in western dialects; in Ikavian pronunciation, it also evolved into pre- or prije- due to potential ambiguity with pri- ("approach, come close to"). For verbs that had -ěti in their infinitive, the past participle ending -ěl evolved into -io in Ijekavian Neoštokavian.

The following are some examples:

| English | Predecessor | Ekavian | Ikavian | Ijekavian | Ijekavian development |
|---|---|---|---|---|---|
| beautiful | *lěp | lep | lip | lijep | long ě → ije |
| time | *vrěme | vreme | vrime | vrijeme | long ě → ije |
| faith | *věra | vera | vira | vjera | short ě → je |
| crossing | *prělaz | prelaz | prelaz or prijelaz | prelaz or prijelaz | pr + long ě → prije |
| times | *vrěmena | vremena | vrimena | vremena | r + short ě → re |
| need | *trěbati | trebati | tribat(i) | trebati | r + short ě → re |
| heat | *grějati | grejati | grijati | grijati | r + short ě → ri |
| saw | *viděl | video | vidio | vidio | ěl → io |
| village | *selo | selo | selo | selo | e in root, not ě |

== See also ==
- Serbo-Croatian
- Serbo-Croatian grammar
- Comparison of Serbo-Croatian standard varieties

== Bibliography ==
- Alexander, Ronelle (2000). In honor of diversity: the linguistic resources of the Balkans. Kenneth E. Naylor memorial lecture series in South Slavic linguistics. Vol. 2. Columbus, Ohio: Ohio State University, Dept. of Slavic and East European Languages and Literatures.
- Belić, Aleksandar (2000). O dijalektima. Zavod za udžbenike i nastavna sredstva. ISBN 9788617076311.
- Blum, Daniel (2002). Sprache und Politik : Sprachpolitik und Sprachnationalismus in der Republik Indien und dem sozialistischen Jugoslawien, (1945-1991) [Language and Policy: Language Policy and Linguistic Nationalism in the Republic of India and the Socialist Yugoslavia (1945–1991)]. Beiträge zur Südasienforschung (in German). Vol. 192. Würzburg: Ergon. p. 200. ISBN 3-89913-253-X.
- Brozović, Dalibor (1992). Michael Clyne (ed.). Serbo-Croatian as Pluricentric Language, u: Pluricentric Languages. Differing Norms in Different Nations. Berlin-New York: Mouton de Gruyter. pp. 347–380.
- Crystal, David (1998) [1987]. The Cambridge encyclopedia of language. Cambridge, New York: Cambridge University Press.
- Kapović, Mate (7 November 2017). "The Position of Kajkavian in the South Slavic Dialect Continuum in Light of Old Accentual Isoglosses" (PDF). Zeitschrift für Slawistik. 62 (4): 606–620. doi:10.1515/slaw-2017-0038. ISSN 0044-3506. S2CID 55046560.
- Kordić, Snježana (2010). Jezik i nacionalizam [Language and Nationalism] (PDF). Rotulus Universitas (in Serbo-Croatian). Zagreb: Durieux. p. 430. doi:10.2139/ssrn.3467646. ISBN 978-953-188-311-5. LCCN 2011520778. OCLC 729837512. OL 15270636W. CROSBI 475567. Archived (PDF) from the original on 1 June 2012.
- Lisac, Josip (2003), Hrvatska dijalektologija 1 – Hrvatski dijalekti i govori štokavskog narječja i hrvatski govori torlačkog narječja, Zagreb: Golden marketing – Tehnička knjiga, ISBN 953-212-168-4
- Lisac, Josip (2009). Hrvatska Dijalektologija 2. Čakavsko narječje. Zagreb: Golden Marketing – Tehnička knjiga. ISBN 9789532121698.
- Matasović, Ranko (2008). Poredbenopovijesna gramatika hrvatskoga jezika. Zagreb: Matica hrvatska. ISBN 978-953-150-840-7.
- Okuka, Miloš (2008). Srpski dijalekti. Zagreb: Prosvjeta. ISBN 978-953-7611-06-4.
