= Chakavian =

South Slavic supradialect or language

- čakavski
- Native to: Croatia; Slovenia (Račice, Kozina)
- Ethnicity: Croats
- Native speakers: 80,000 (2019)
- Language family: Indo-European: Balto-Slavic; Slavic; South Slavic; Western South Slavic; Chakavian
- Standard forms: Burgenland Croatian
- Dialects: Buzet; Northern Chakavian; Central Chakavian; Southern Chakavian; Southwestern Istrian; Southeastern Chakavian

Language codes
- ISO 639-3: ckm
- Glottolog: chak1265
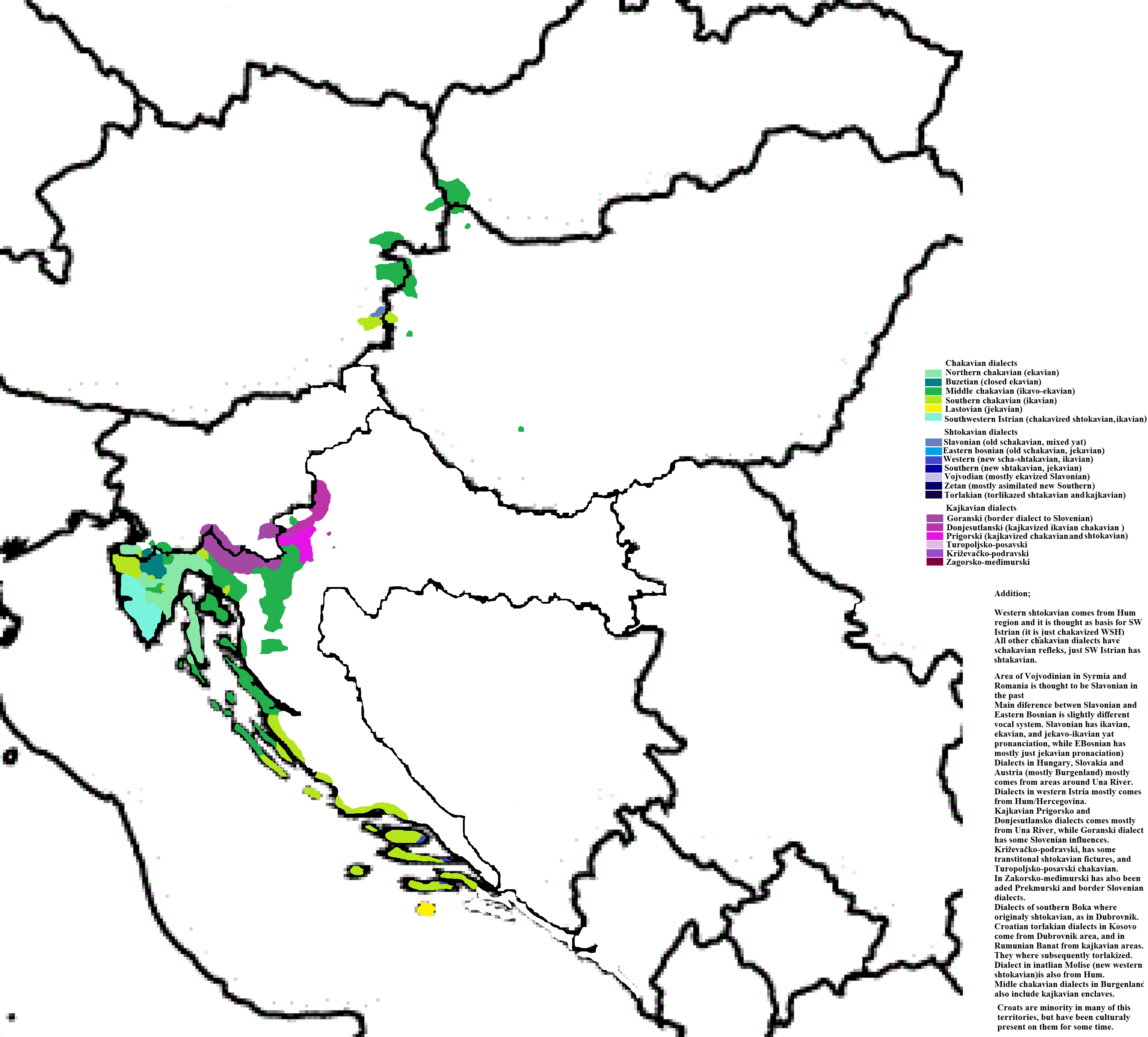
- Chakavian and transitional dialects, according to data from M. Kapović, J. Lisac, I. Lukežić

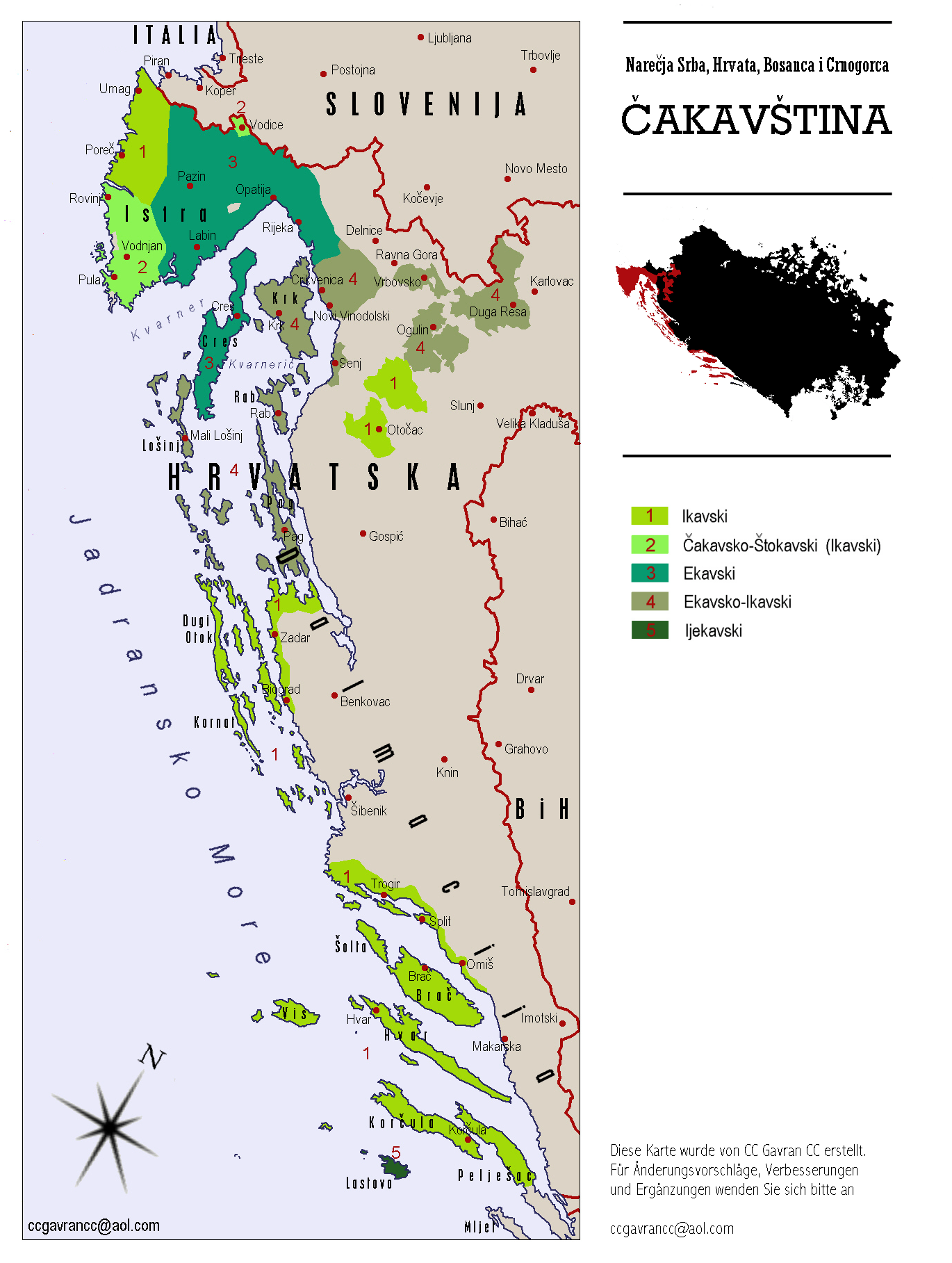
- Chakavian dialects in Croatia

Chakavian or Čakavian (/tʃæˈkɑːviən/, /tʃə-/, /-ˈkæv-/, Croatian: čakavski [tʃǎːkaʋskiː] proper name: čakavica or čakavština [tʃakǎːʋʃtina] own name: čokovski, čakavski, čekavski) is a South Slavic supradialect or language spoken by Croats along the Adriatic coast, in the historical regions of Dalmatia, Istria, Croatian Littoral and parts of coastal and southern Central Croatia (now collectively referred to as Adriatic Croatia or Littoral Croatia), as well as by the Burgenland Croats as Burgenland Croatian in southeastern Austria, northwestern Hungary and southwestern Slovakia as well as few municipalities in southern Slovenia on the border with Croatia.

Chakavian represents the basis for early literary standards in Croatia, and until the modern age was simply known and understood, along with the Kajkavian and Shtokavian idioms in Croatia, as the Croatian language (hrvatski jezik). Legal and liturgical to literary texts until the 16th century, including literary work by "the father of Croatian literature" Marko Marulić and the first Croatian dictionary authored by Faust Vrančić, among others, are mostly Chakavian in their form. The term Chakavian and definition of the dialect date from the mid-19th century.

== Classification ==
Historically, the classification of Chakavian has been a subject of much debate regarding both the question of how should it be named and whether it ought to be considered a dialect or a language, as well as the question of what its relation is to neighboring vernaculars (Kajkavian, Western Shtokavian and Eastern Shtokavian).

Autonyms used throughout history by various Chakavian writers have been straightforward, ranging from mainly Croatian (harvatski, harvacki, hrvatski) to Slavic (slovinski) and Illyrian (illirski), but also other idioms, Kajkavian and Shtokavian, throughout history were named and understood as Croatian language. Chakavian compared to others is one of the oldest written South Slavic varieties that had made a visible appearance in legal documents—as early as 1275 (Istrian land survey) and 1288 (Vinodol codex), where the predominantly vernacular Chakavian is recorded, mixed with elements of Church Slavic. However, in both of them it is named as "Croatian language" (jazikom harvaskim/hrvatski/hervatski).

The term Chakavian (noun čakavac) is first recorded in 1728 in the Dizionario italiano-latino-illirico of Ardelio Della Bella and in the beginning of the 19th century in Joakim Stulić's Lexicon latino–italico–illyricum, while adjective (čakavski) in Antun Mažuranić's analysis of Vinodol codex (1843). No Croatian literary writer used words "čakavac" and "čakavski" to describe their, Croatian, language until the late 19th century, and it is mostly since the 20th century that these terms have been popularized through the education system.

Croatian literary authors of what would later be known as Chakavian and Shtokavian idioms, from different parts of Dalmatia and Ragusa, in corresponding letters wrote that they belonged to the same Croatian nation, and spoke the same language ("časti našega jezika", "naš jezik") which they named as Croatian or Slavic ("kud jezik harvatski prohodi", "slovinski jezik"). With its name and dialectological or language form, it is mainly a creation advanced by linguists. Today, the term Chakavian is accepted by its speakers and linguists in Croatia, but usually for practical reasons.

In its almost thousand years, Chakavian has undergone many phonetic, morphological, and syntactical changes — chiefly in the turbulent mainlands, but less in isolated islands. The problem with classifying Chakavian within Western South Slavic stems in part from there being no unanimous opinion on the set of traits a dialect has to possess to be classified as Chakavian (usually argued only as a gradation of "Chakavism"). Its sub-dialects have various differences but also closeness to neighboring Shtokavian and Kajkavian speeches, and all three dialects are part of a dialect continuum, while their diversification into dialects and languages is mostly political, ethnic and symbolic. From a linguistic point of view, national and other names based on interrogatory pronouns are practical, but also inaccurate as dialect/language definitions; linguists would more precisely replace these with complex isoglosses in the dialect continuum.

Dialectologists and Slavists maintain that when the separation of Western South Slavic speeches happened, they separated into five divergent groups, more specifically two, one Slovene and second Serbo-Croatian with four divergent groups — Kajkavian, Chakavian, Western Shtokavian and Eastern Shtokavian. The latter group can be additionally divided into first (Kajkavian, Chakavian, Western Shtokavian) and second (Eastern Shtokavian, Torlakian). According to isoglosses, and presumed end of existence of the Southwestern Slavic around the 8th–9th century, the formation of the assumed Proto-Chakavian linguistic and territorial unit would be around the 9th–10th century (when it and Proto-Western Shtokavian separated), while of the Chakavian dialect known today between the 12th–16th century.

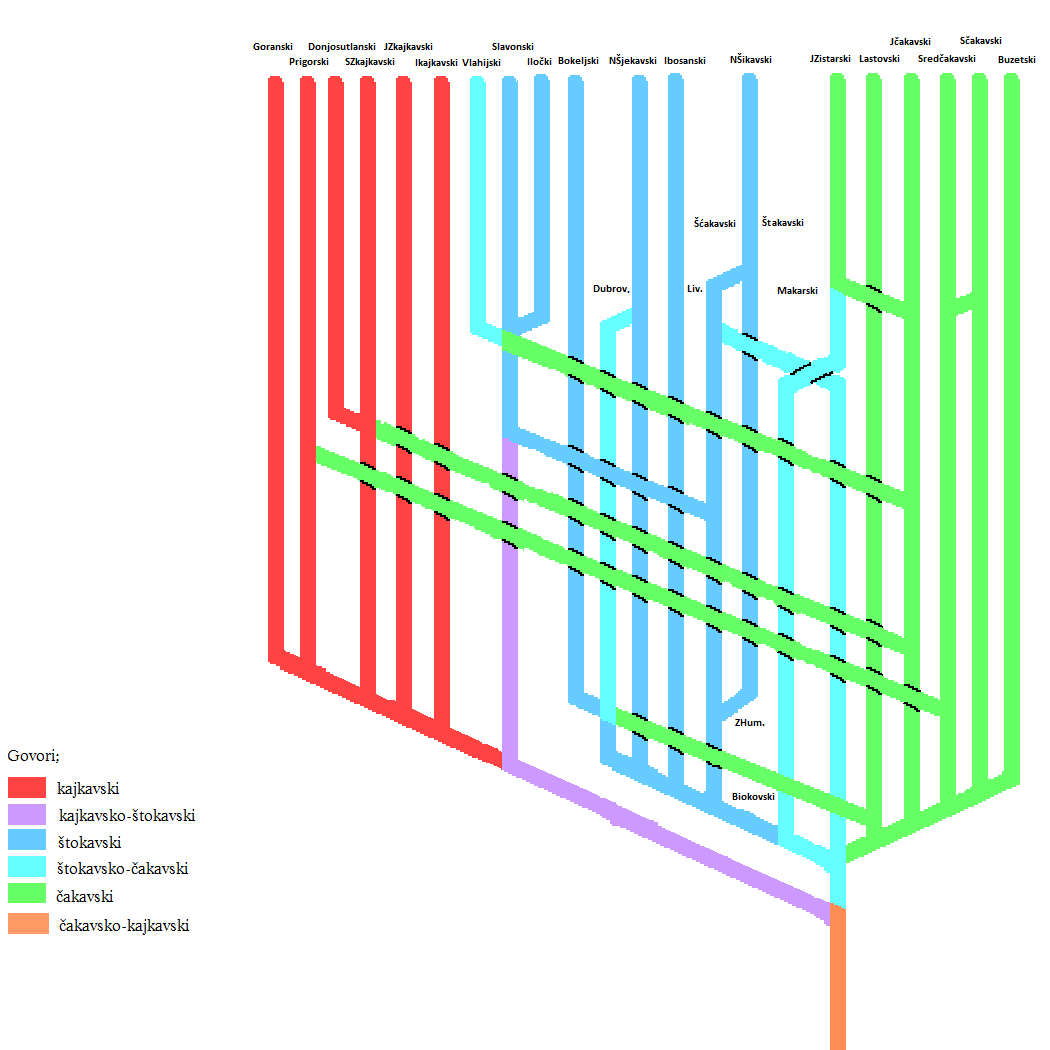
Schematic presentation of the development of Chakavian, Western Shtokavian and Kajkavian dialects and sub-dialects, according to data by M. Kapović, J. Lisac, I. Lukežić and M. Lončarić.

Very few, trivial isoglosses exist that separate all Chakavian speeches from all other Western South Slavic dialects nor do exist common isoglosses to all Chakavian sub-dialects from which would be possible a deduction of a "Proto-Chakavian" dialect or language (which is possible with Proto-Kajkavian and Proto-Shtokavian). Ranko Matasović concludes as well that "the Chakavian dialect was never entirely unique, i.e. it is not possible to find common linguistic innovations that would encompass all Chakavian speeches", "while common-Shokavian and common-Kaikavian innovations do exist". There exist significant differences between Northern and all other Chakavian sub-dialects, as Northern Chakavian has characteristics in common with Slovene and Kajkavian while Southern Chakavian with Western Shtokavian, but also Northern Chakavian has with Shtokavian, and both Northern and Southern Chakavian have with the Kajkavian dialect.

Many linguists, including Aleksandar Belić, Stjepan Ivšić, Zvonimir Junković, Pavle Ivić, Dalibor Brozović among others, in their comparative analysis concluded that Chakavian is closely related to Western Shtokavian (particularly those of Schakavian ikavian expression like the Slavonian dialect and Younger Ikavian dialect). Ivić, for example, concluded that the Chakavian dialect is genetically much closer to Shtokavian than Kajkavian, and initially argued that:

"Historically speaking, Chakavian is to a considerable extent a peripheral zone of Shtokavian which (in) many respects lagged behind the development of the [Shtokavian] core, and which parts developed locally limited innovations (with the fact that its Northwestern branches had from the very beginning specific evolutionary contacts with the Slovenian language)".

Brozović argued four accentological cores from which dialects emerged, one in which were grouped few Chakavian speeches, while the majority of Chakavian speeches were grouped with Western Shtokavian dialect (Southeastern Chakavian) and part of Southern-Slavonian dialect (Northwestern and Central Chakavian). Today, Chakavian is mostly considered as a separate and unique linguistic system which can be further divided.

According to Mate Kapović, some Croatian linguists have a "Chakavian nationalist" desire to prove various speeches as Chakavian which, according to him, is scientifically unsustainable. Josip Silić, for example, argued that Chakavian is not a dialect of Croatian language but a one of three Croatian linguistic systems, a language on its own but without standard, which was met with criticism. At the suggestion of American linguist Kirk Miller in 2019, the Chakavian dialect was recognized by SIL International as a living language with its own ISO 639-3 code – ckm in 2020. The recognition was mostly met with silence and ignorance in Croatia and by Croatian linguists and scientists (until early 2023 news media reports), partly because it does not affect dialect status of Chakavian nor does it have relevancy in international and national linguistic science.

Academic and currently leading expert on Chakavian, Silvana Vranić, noted that Chakavian idiom is a dialect group of sub-dialects of Croatian language of Western South-Slavic from which it cannot be removed and considered a separate language. She criticized Miller's documentation, as it was based on two irrelevant and unscientific sources with "scientific falsehood" (including false claim of low dialectological difference between different Chakavian speeches). Joško Božanić noted the paradox of SIL International, as the institute already registered the Croatian language in 2008 as a South Slavic language with three dialects (Kajkavian, Chakavian, Shtokavian). He considers that the re-valorization of Chakavian idiom should not come from a foreign country, and Croatian initiatives possibly need to aim listing it on UNESCO's Red Book list on endangered languages in Europe.

Josip Bratulić and Mira Menac-Mihalić consider that such recognition won't achieve anything, including its preservation, as Chakavian won't be spoken or studied more than it was until now. Domagoj Vidović openly criticized it as an example of ignorance and misunderstanding of the Croatian language as well as history, definition and characteristics of the so-called Chakavian dialect. Vidović relates it to the modern Croatian phenomenon of "linguistic separatism" which argues for finding a solution for preserving various Chakavian, Kajkavian and Shtokavian idioms from influence of Croatian standard language, although various efforts in Croatia are already made for their preservation and popularization, and the comparatively much longer influence of the Italian language on Chakavian is ignored. Croatian political scientist Viktor Matić considers that the Croatian "linguistic separatism" has antagonism against Croatian standard language, but it is also result of previous fetishising of Croatian standard language and Serbo-Croatian language.

=== Research and history ===
==== Early modern age ====
The earliest theorization about Chakavian originates in the 19th century nation-building and romantic nationalism. At the time, the widespread belief was that individual ethnic nations must be historically characterized and identified with a specific language (which was argued pseudo-scientifically according interrogatory pronouns, yat reflex, and various historiographical theories usually related to De Administrando Imperio from the 10th century). In the beginning of the debate, as Chakavian did not exist yet, Kajkavian was identified with the Croats and Shtokavian with the Serbs (with Shtokavian-speaking Croats considered as "Catholic Serbs").

As soon as theorization about Chakavian began, early Slavists such as Josef Dobrovský, Pavel Jozef Šafařík, Jernej Kopitar, and Vuk Karadžić grouped Chakavian with Shtokavian, but as Shtokavian was perceived as an exclusively Serbian language, the Croats were reduced to merely a toponym (or Chakavian and Shtokavian-speaking "Catholic Serbs"). At the time, were also coined terms such as "Slavonic-Serbian" and "Serbo-Croatian" language. With new insights by the mid-19th century, Chakavian was considered to be the only and original language of Croats, while Kajkavian was related to the Slovenes, and Shtokavian continued to be related with the Serbs (per Vuk Karadžić etc.).

Others however, like August Leskien, continued to advance the older opinion until the late 19th century. The basic premise was that with the Ottoman invasion most of Croatia lost its native ethnic Croatian population because the presumed borders of the Chakavian speakers were reduced, and they therefore became ethnically Serbian. Some believed that Kajkavian-speaking Croats took over Serbian (Shtokavian-Chakavian) literary language. As such, more political than scientific misconceptions were present both on the Serbian and Croatian sides and internationally, and continue to plague the public and less scientific viewpoint and understanding of the Serbo-Croatian dialects, being among pivotal points of legitimacy for the 20th century nationalist revisionism and pretensions (including the recent 1990s Yugoslav Wars). The terms of Chakavian and Shtokavian dialect were introduced to Croatian linguistics by Antun Mažuranić and Vjekoslav Babukić in the mid-19th century.

==== Recent studies ====
Due to its archaic nature, early medieval development, and corpus of vernacular literacy, the typical Chakavian dialect has attracted numerous dialectologists who have documented its nuances, so that Chakavian was among the best described Slavic dialects, but its atypical tsakavism was partly neglected and less studied. Contemporary dialectologists are particularly interested in it since it has retained the old accentuation system characterized by a Proto-Slavic new rising accent (neoacute) and the old position of stress, and also numerous Proto-Slavic and some Proto-Indo-European archaisms in its vocabulary.

Another feature of Chakavian is the strong influence of Romance languages in its lexicon and phonology (especially from Italian, Dalmatian and Venetian). Furthermore, Italian linguist Matteo Bartoli wrote in 1919 that more than one third of the Chakavian spoken in Istria was loanworded from Neo-Latin (Romance) languages, a percentage similar to the one in the Gheg dialect of northern coastal Albania. It is also well known for many maritime words and terms missing in the Croatian standard language.

Many lexicons of local Chakavian varieties have been published. The representative modern work in the field is Čakavisch-deutsches Lexikon, vol. 1.-3, Koeln-Vienna, 1979–1983, edited by Croatian linguists Mate Hraste, Petar Šimunović and German linguist Reinhold Olesch; Janne Kalsbeek's work on The Čakavian Dialect of Orbanići near Žminj in Istria (1998); Keith Langston's Cakavian Prosody: The Accentual Patterns of the Cakavian Dialects of Croatian (2006); Josip Lisac's Hrvatska Dijalektologija 2. Čakavsko narječje (2009); various works by Iva Lukežić, Sanja Zubčić, Silvana Vranić, Sanja Vulić, Mate Kapović and so on.

== Chakavian literary language ==
Since Chakavian was the first South Slavic dialect to emerge from the Church Slavic matrix, both literacy and literature in this dialect abound with numerous texts — from legal and liturgical to literary: lyric and epic poetry, drama, novel in verses, as well as philological works that contain Chakavian vocabulary. Chakavian idiom was de facto the main public and official language in medieval Croatia up to the 16th century. Chakavian literature uses many words of Latin, Dalmatian, and Italian origin due to the millennial long contacts with these languages. When comparing different epochs with different status of Chakavian dialect (i.e. Croatian language), such words became more widespread in local speeches in the last few centuries, creating various Chakavian-Italian hybrid words. There are also significant differences in the lexicon between Northwestern and Southeastern groups of sub-dialects, showing there is no unique Chakavian language system.

Comparison of the earliest texts in Croatia shows that the Slavic language changed until the 11th century and was not exclusively of Chakavian idiom; Chakavian features started to be widespread only since the 12th–13th century when the formation of Chakavian dialect can be dated. Monuments of literacy began to appear in the 11th and 12th centuries, and artistic literature in the 15th. There were two zones of Chakavian, northern and southern (both mainly along the Adriatic coast and islands, with centres like Senj, Zadar, Split, Hvar, Korčula). Many of these used Chakavian, and up to the 17th century the texts were written in Glagolitic, Bosnian Cyrillic, and the Latin alphabet.

The Chakavian language by far surpassed the position of a simple vernacular dialect and strongly influenced other Croatian literary dialects, particularly Western Shtokavian: the first Shtokavian texts, such as the Vatican Croatian Prayer Book dated to 1400, exhibit numerous literary Chakavianisms. The early Shtokavian literary and philological output, mainly from Dubrovnik (1500–1600) up to Džore Držić, was essentially a mixed Shtokavian–Chakavian idiom.

The most famous early Chakavian author is Marko Marulić in 15th–16th century, the "father of Croatian literature", and were written first Croatian novels and poems. Also, the first Croatian dictionary, authored by Faust Vrančić, is mostly Chakavian in its form. Although in the 18th century it was, with Kajkavian and Shtokavian, one of the bases of Croatian literary centre in Ozalj (led by Croatian noble families Frankopan and Zrinski), the tradition of the Chakavian literary language had declined in the same century; but it has helped shape both Croatian literary language and the standard Croatian language in many ways, chiefly in morphology and phonetics, and Chakavian dialectal poetry is still a vital part of Croatian literature.

In the Croatian and world literature, it re-emerged in the 20th century due to early writings of Tin Ujević, Marko Uvodić, and Miljenko Smoje; the most prominent representatives in the 20th century are Mate Balota, Vladimir Nazor and Drago Gervais. In 1938, Balota's collection of poems, Dragi kamen, was published in Zagreb, while his only novel, Tight Country: A Novel from Istrian Folk Life, was published in 1946. The novel became a cult classic among Kvarner and Istrian Croats. At the end of the 1980s, in Istria and Kvarner there began a special subgenre of pop-rock music movement Ča-val (Cha wave); artists that were part of this scene used the Chakavian dialect in their lyrics, and often fused rock music with traditional Istra-Kvarner music (most notably Alen Vitasović, Gustafi, and Šajeta).

== Area of use ==
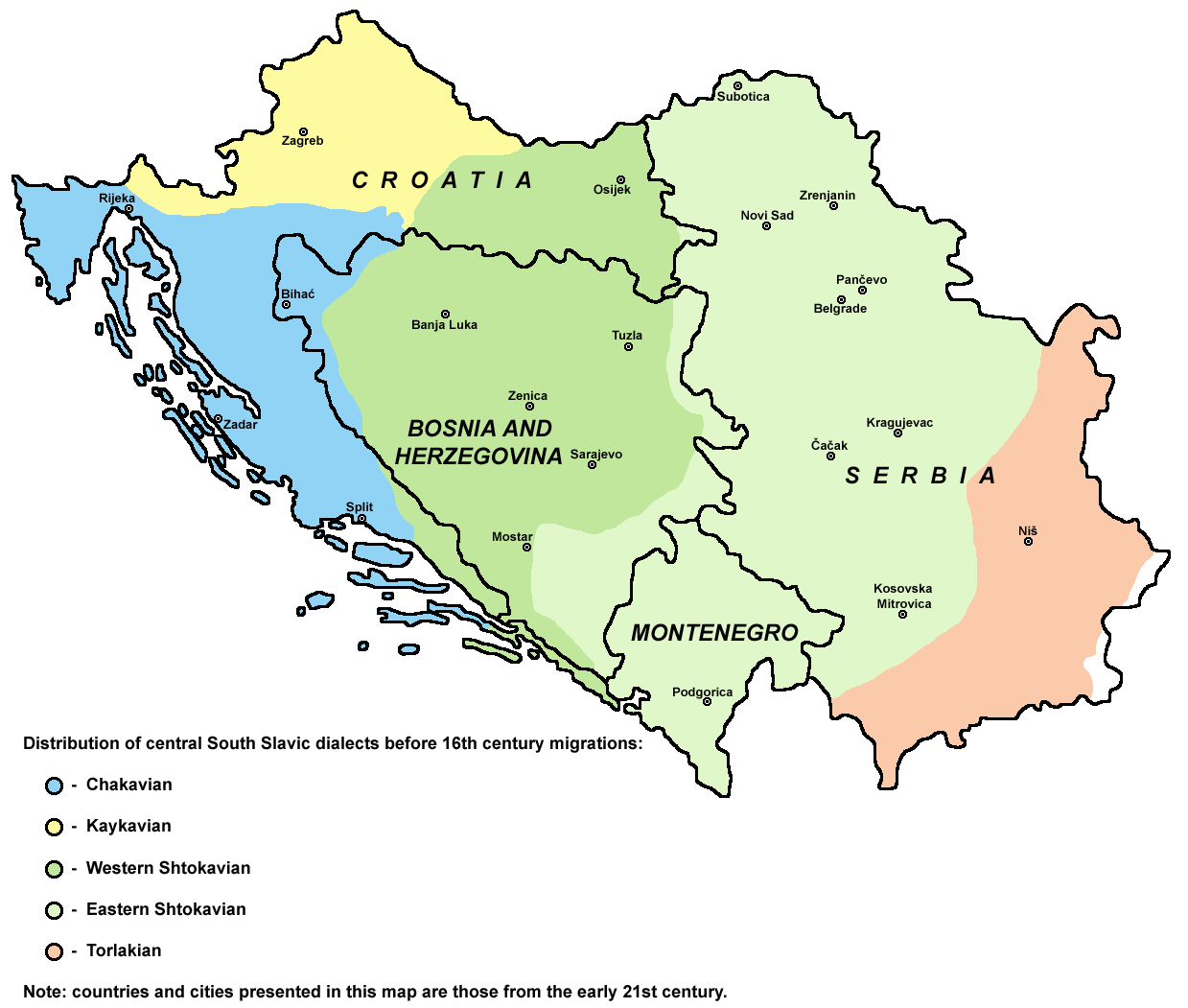
Assumed distribution of Chakavian (blue), Kajkavian (yellow), and Western Shtokavian (green) before 16th century migrations. Modern state borders shown.

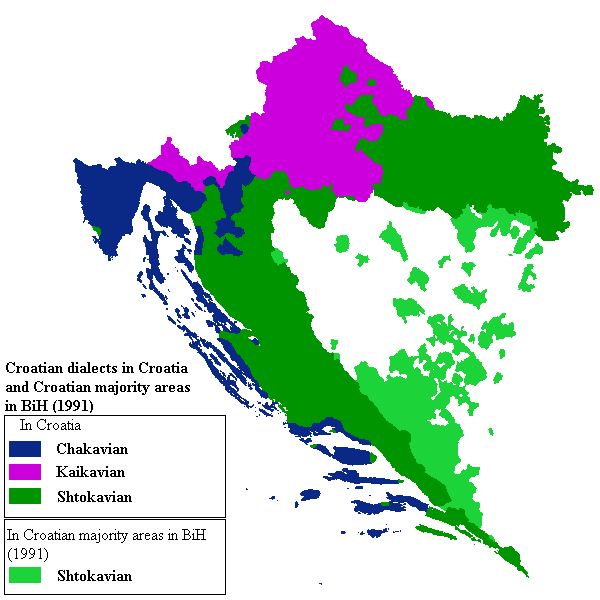
Location map of dialects in Croatia and areas in Bosnia and Herzegovina with Croat majority. Chakavian in blue.

In the Middle Ages, on the territory of medieval Croatia formed three dialects; Chakavian, Western Shtokavian and Kajkavian. Initially, the Chakavian dialect covered a much wider area than today: the major part of western-central and southern Croatia southwards of Kupa and westwards of Una river, bordering with the western and southwestern Bosnia and Herzegovina, including all the Eastern Adriatic islands northwest of Mljet, while substratum of Chakavian in Dalmatia possibly existed all the way to Dubrovnik. Croatian dialectologist Petar Šimunović considered that all areas up to and including Dubrovnik were originally Chakavian.

The Dubrovnik area has been phonologically closer to Southern Chakavian than Eastern Shtokavian. It is possible that some Chakavian idioms were also present in early medieval Montenegro and Albania. However, linguists also point to the fact that it is not possible to draw a historical border between Chakavian and Shtokavian, especially Western Shtokavian, with certainty. According to Serbian linguist Pavle Ivić, "the question of where the border of these two dialects was in the Middle Ages is not quite appropriate".

During and after the Ottoman invasion and subsequent warfare (15th–19th centuries) on the territory of Croatia, the Chakavian dialect area ("jazik hrvatski") became significantly reduced, and on the Croatian mainland, it has been almost completely replaced by the adjacent Shtokavian dialect. In the process, the evident dialect continuum was broken as old transitional dialects were lost. Based on 35 letters by Ottoman officers in their native language between the mid-16th and mid-17th century in Dalmatia, almost all of them were Chakavian-Schakavian ikavian. Today, only Northern Chakavian and partly Buzet dialect are widely spoken in the areas where they are located, as all other Chakavian dialects have greatly lost territory, or were assimilated into Shtokavian.

According to Josip Lisac, Chakavian dialect would have been the best dialectological basis for the Croatian standard language (Chakavian and Kajkavian nevertheless still had an important active role in the standardization of the Croatian language). The reason it was not chosen for the basis of Croatian standard language in the 19th century is considered to be the significant reduction of dialect area due to previous migrations and change of dialectical contacts, but others disagree and point out that such arguments initially only hindered scientific research. It certainly was the main, but not the only reason, as the "results of convergent Croatian literary and linguistic development" can be traced to literary and sacral works at least since first half of the 16th century. Over time, it was perceived as an archaic, less prestigious dialect.

The use of Chakavian varies by the region where it was historically spoken. It is now mostly reduced to Croatia along the eastern Adriatic: Adriatic islands, and sporadically in the mainland coast, with rare inland enclaves up to central Croatia, and minor enclaves in Austria and Montenegro. All of those areas were in contact with Italo-Dalmatian and Eastern Romance languages, which heavily influenced the development of Chakavian. It is estimated that the share of Croatian language speakers who spoke a Chakavian dialect fell from 23% to 12% over the course of the 20th century.

Areas where Chakavian is spoken include:

- The majority of Adriatic islands, except for the easternmost islands (Mljet and Elafiti), the easternmost areas of Hvar and Brač, and the area around the city of Korčula.
- The entire Istria peninsula, and Kvarner littoral and islands; minor coastal enclaves occur sporadically in the Dalmatian mainland around Zadar, Biograd, Split, and on the Pelješac peninsula. It has almost vanished in Šibenik and Omiš.
- Within the Croatian inland, it is the Gacka valley, and minor enclaves occur in Pokupje valley and Žumberak hills, northwards around Karlovac.
- A minor enclave of Bigova (Trašte) at Boka Kotorska in Montenegro, the mixed Čičarija dialect in Slovenia, refugees from the Ottoman Empire in Burgenland (eastern Austria) and around Bratislava, and a substratum in Slavomolisano .
- Among recent emigrants in North America (chiefly in New Orleans, Los Angeles, and Vancouver).

== Sub-dialects ==
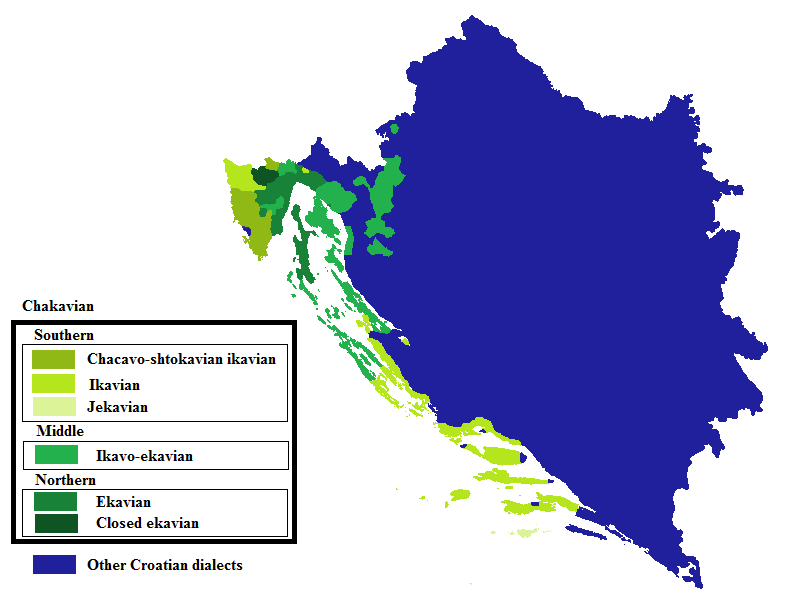
Chakavian dialects in Croatia, according to D. Brozović

Chakavian dialect in Istria, by D. B. Northern Chakavian Buzet dialect Central Chakavian Southern Chakavian Southwestern Istrian

There is no unanimous opinion on the set of traits a dialect has to possess to be classified as Chakavian (rather than its admixture with Shtokavian or Kajkavian). Josip Lisac mentions up to 21, but many of them are not common to all Chakavian sub-dialects and often can be found in non-Chakavian dialects. The following traits were mostly proposed:

- interrogatory pronoun is "ča" or "zač" (on some islands also "ca" or "zace");
- old accentuation and 3 accents (mostly in ultima or penultima);
- phonological features that yield /a/ for Old Slavic phonemes in characteristic positions: "language" is jazik (or zajik) in Chakavian and jezik in Shtokavian;
- /j/ as in Slovene and Kajkavian where Shtokavian has /dʑ/ ⟨đ⟩: Chakavian, Slovene, Kajkavian meja, Shtokavian međa ("border");
- historic /m/ shifted to /n/ at the end of words, unlike in Shtokavian: standard Croatian volim ("I love"), sam ("I am"), selom ("village" - Instrumental case), Chakavian volin, san, selon;
- in conditional occur specific prefixes: bin-, biš-, bimo-, bite-, bis;
- contracted or lacking aorist tense;
- some subdialects on island of Pag have kept the archaic form of imperfect.

The Chakavian dialect is divided along several criteria. In the older literature of Aleksandar Belić, Stjepan Ivšić, Pavle Ivić, Dalibor Brozović and others, it was mostly divided into two (Northern and Southern, later, Northwestern and Southeastern) or three main varieties (Northwestern, Central, Southeastern), while in the work by Willem Vermeer and Keith Langston there are three main varieties (Northwestern, Central, Southeastern).

According to the reflex of the Common Slavic phoneme yat */ě/, there are four varieties:

1. Ekavian (northeastern Istria, Rijeka and Bakar, Cres island): */ě/ > /e/
2. Ikavian–Ekavian (islands Lošinj, Krk, Rab, Pag, Dugi Otok, Ugljan, mainland Vinodol and Pokupje): */ě/ > /i/ or /e/, according to Jakubinskij's law
3. Ikavian (southwestern Istria, islands Brač, Hvar, Vis, Korčula, Pelješac, Dalmatian coast at Zadar and Split, inland Gacka): */ě/ > /i/
4. Ijekavian (Lastovo island, Janjina on Pelješac): */ě/ > /je/ or /ije/

Obsolete literature commonly refers to Ikavian–Ekavian dialects as "mixed", which is a misleading term because the yat reflexes were governed by Jakubinskij's law. According to Lisac, division per reflex of yat is most reasonable, although even then exist significant sub-level differences.

According to their tonal (accentual) features, Chakavian dialects are divided into the following groups:

- dialects with the "classical" Chakavian three-tone system;
- dialects with two tonic accents;
- dialects with four tonic accents similar to that of Shtokavian dialects;
- dialects with four-tonic Shtokavian system;
- dialects mixing traits of the first and the second group.

Using a combination of accentual and phonological criteria, Croatian dialectologists Dalibor Brozović (1988) and Josip Lisac (2009) divide Chakavian into six (sub)dialects:

Name	Reflex of Common Slavic yat	Distribution
Buzet dialect	Ekavian (closed e)	Northern Istria around Buzet; transitional Northern Chakavian-Slovene dialect
Northern Chakavian	Ekavian	Northeastern Istria, Central Istria around Pazin and Žminj, Labin, Kastav, Rijeka, Cres
Central Chakavian (Middle Chakavian)	Ikavian–Ekavian	Dugi Otok, Kornati, Lošinj, Krk, Rab, Pag, Ugljan (except the southernmost Southern Chakavian village of Kukljica, exhibiting many shared features with Ugljan's otherwise Central Chakavian dialects), Vinodol, Ogulin, Brinje, Otočac, Duga Resa, part of Central and Northeastern Istria
Southern Chakavian	Ikavian	Korčula, Pelješac, Brač, Hvar, Vis, Šolta, outskirts of Split and Zadar, Northwestern Istria
Southwestern Istrian	Ikavian	Southwestern and Northeastern ("Vodice oasis") part of Istria; transitional Southern Chakavian-Western Shtokavian dialect
Southeastern Chakavian	Ijekavian	Lastovo, Janjina on Pelješac, Bigova on the south of Montenegro

== Non-palatal tsakavism ==
Besides the usual Chakavian (with typical pronoun "ča"), in some Adriatic islands and in eastern Istria another special variant is also spoken which lacks most palatals, with other parallel deviations called "tsakavism" (cakavizam):

- palatal "č" is replaced by the sibilant "ts" (c): pronouns ca and zac (or ce and zace).
- palatals š (sh) and ž (zh) are replaced by sibilants s and z (or transitive sj and zj).
- đ (dj), lj and nj are replaced by the simple d, l and n (without iotation).
- Frequent diphthongs instead of simple vowels: o > uo, a > oa, e > ie, etc.
- Yat (jat): longer y (= ue) exists in addition to the usual short i (or e).
- Appurtenance is often noted by possessive dative (rarely adjective nor genitive)
- Vocative is mostly lacking and replaced by a nominative in appellating construction.
- Auxiliary particles are always before the main verb: se- (self), bi- (if), će- (be).

The largest area of tsakavism is in eastern Istria at Labin, Rabac and a dozen nearby villages; minor mainland enclaves are the towns Bakar and Trogir. Atavism is also frequent in Adriatic islands: part of Lošinj and nearby islets, Ist, Baška in Krk, Pag town, the western parts of Brač (Milna), Hvar town, and the entire island of Vis with adjacent islets.

The first two features are similar to mazurzenie in Polish, where it is present in many dialects, and tsokanye, occurring in the Old Novgorod dialect.

== Phonology ==
The basic phonology of Chakavian, with representation in Gaj's Latin alphabet and IPA, is as follows:

	Labial	Alveolar	Post- alveolar	Palatal	Velar
Nasal	m m	n n		ɲ nj	
Plosive	p b p b	t d t d		c ć	k ɡ k g
Affricate		ts c	tʃ č		
Fricative	f f	s z s z	ʃ ʒ š ž		x h
Approximant	ʋ v	l l	j j		
Trill		r r			

== Chakavian media ==
- The biannual periodical Čakavska rič (Chakavian Word), with 50 annual volumes, published from 1971 by the Literary Association (Književni krug) in Split.
- The annual periodical Pannonische Jahrbuch with dozen volumes partly in Chakavian of Burgenland Croats, published since 1994 by the Pannonisches Institut in Gutterbach (Burgenland, Austria).
- The annual periodical Vinodolski zbornik with a dozen volumes published in Crikvenica, including different texts in the local Chakavian of the Vinodol Valley.
- The annual singing festival Melodije Istre i Kvarnera takes place every year in different towns of the Istria and Kvarner regions. Performers perform in local Chakavian dialects exclusively.
- A major perpetual program in the Chakavian of Dalmatia is given by the local television stations in Split, Rijeka, and Pula. Other minor half-Chakavian media with temporary Chakavian contents also include the local radio programs in the cities of Split and Rijeka and Krk island radio.

== Examples ==
- Ča je, je, tako je vavik bilo, ča će bit, će bit, ma nekako će već bit! (mainland half-Chakavian)
- Ca je, je, tako je vajka bilo, ca će bit, će bit, ma nekokor će već bit! (vicinity of Labin in eastern Istria)
- Do Boh da bi strela vo te hitila! (vicinity of Labin in eastern Istria)

== See also ==
- Dialects of Serbo-Croatian
- Anti-Croat sentiment
