= Younger Ikavian =

Shtokavian Serbo-Croatian dialect

- Bosnian-Dalmatian
- Native to: Bosnia and Herzegovina Croatia Hungary Serbia
- Region: Bačka Central Bosnia Dalmatian Hinterland Western Herzegovina
- Ethnicity: Croats
- Language family: Indo-European: Balto-Slavic; Slavic; South Slavic; Western; Shtokavian; Neo-Shtokavian; Younger Ikavian

Language codes
- ISO 639-3: –

Younger Ikavian (Serbo-Croatian: mlađi ikavski), also called Western Ikavian/Western Neoshtokavian Ikavian (zapadni ikavski/zapadni novoštokavski ikavski), or Bosnian–Dalmatian dialect (bosansko-dalmatinski dijalekt), is a subdialect of Shtokavian Serbo-Croatian spoken primarily by Croats in Croatia, Bosnia and Herzegovina, Serbia, and Italy. It is spoken to a lesser extent by Bosniaks and rarely by Serbs in Bosnia and Herzegovina. Most speakers use the Latin alphabet.

== Area of use ==
In Croatia, it is spoken in pockets of Gorski Kotar, south of Novi Vinodolski in the Lika hinterland, Kordun, central Slavonia, Dalmatia, and in small pockets on the Dalmatian islands of Šolta, Brač, Hvar, and Korčula.

In Bosnia and Herzegovina, it is spoken west of the rivers of Bosna and Neretva, in the Bačka region of Serbia and Hungary (inc. Budapest), and in Molise, Italy.

== Characteristics ==
This dialect is a sub-dialect of the Shtokavian dialect group, specifically the western sub-group. It is a descendant of Western Shtokavian, which was spoken in parts of Dalmatia, Western Bosnia and Western Herzegovina. Western Shtokavian had several typically western features like Schakavism, Ikavism, a reflex "j", an acute accent, which makes it closely related to the Chakavian dialects.

Although one of the dialect's characteristics is its Ikavian yat reflex (*/ě/ > /i/), there do exist some local differences with rare examples of the Ekavian or Ijekavian reflex. It has some similarities to Southern Chakavian and Slavonian dialect. The same applies to its morphology, which has some Italian influence, too.

With regard to its accentology, the Younger Ikavian dialect has four accents. Sometimes, there is also an old acute accent, while in the case of Slavomolisano often only two accents occur due the surrounding Italian influences.

Aside from Slavomolisano and the language spoken in coastal regions, which have adopted a greater number of Italian loanwords, its lexicon is found to have many Turkish loanwords. In Lika and the Bačka region, German influences are present, with the latter also having Hungarian influences. Younger Ikavian has a number of similar words with the Chakavian dialect such as "grem", "tovar", "muka", "iskat", "hiža", "lačan", "povidat", "zabiti", "dažd/daždit", "pot", or "vlasi."

In some cases, such as in the area of Slunj, today's Younger Ikavian Shtokavian speakers could be described as Chakavian Ikavian speakers who have been Shtokavised.

== Sub-dialects ==
This dialect can be further divided into Ikavian Schakavian (Šćakavian; from šćakavski) and Ikavian Shtakavian (Štakavian; from štakavski) sub-dialects:

- Schakavian can be found in Dalmatia on its islands and between the rivers of Cetina and Neretva, in the whole of Slavonia, Bosnia and in smaller parts of Western Herzegovina, Lika, and Gorski kotar.
- Shtakavian can be found in Dalmatia west of the Cetina river, in Lika, most of Western Herzegovina, Bačka, Molise, and sporadically in Gorski kotar. In some areas, however, both Schakavian and Shtakavian are spoken.

There are other sub-dialects such as the ones in Makarska-Primorje and Livno-Vrbas, which are both Schakavian, and the Western Hum and Biokovo-Cetina sub-dialects, which are both Shtakavian. These can be further divided into Schakavian and Shtakavian, which feature the change of "-l" into "-o" or "-a":

- Schakavian with an "-a" in the Makarska Riviera (Beforehand, the Makarska-Primorje dialect was spoken there.)
- Shtakavian with an "-a" around Ljubuški (Beforehand, there were southern varieties of the Western Hum dialect, from which Slavomolisano originated and which served as the basis for the change of the Southwestern Istrian-Chakavian Ikavian dialect into a Shtokavian one.)
- Schakavian with an "-o" around Livno and Derventa (Beforehand, the Livno-Vrbas dialect was spoken there.)
- Shtakavian with an "-o" around Mostar (Beforehand, there were northern varieties of the Western Hum dialect, from which the Bunjevac dialect in Bačka originated.)

These subdivisions suggest that several different dialects and local vernaculars existed before the 16th century.

The Slavomolisano dialect (with some Chakavian influences) and Bunjevac dialect are recognised local vernaculars.

=== Status ===
In 2018, Serbia finalised the standardisation of the Bunjevac dialect in Serbia.

In 2021, Croatia categorised the Bunjevac dialect with its three historical-ethnological sub-branches called Dalmatian, Danubian, and Littoral-Lika.

== Bibliography ==
- Kapović, Mate (2015). Povijest hrvatske akcentuacije [The history of Croatian accentuation]. Zagreb: Matica hrvatska. ISBN 9789531509718.
- Kovačević, Marko (2000). "Duvanjski govor i njegove posebnosti" [The speech of Duvno and its peculiarities]. In Krišto, Jure (ed.). Duvanjski zbornik [The collection of papers of Duvno]. Zagreb-Tomislavgrad: Hrvatski institut za povijest–Naša ognjišta–Zajednica Duvnjaka Tomislavgrad. ISBN 9536324253.
- Lisac, Josip (2003), "Zapadni dijalekt - Novoštokavski ikavski dijalekt", Hrvatska dijalektologija 1 – Hrvatski dijalekti i govori štokavskog narječja i hrvatski govori torlačkog narječja, Zagreb: Golden marketing – Tehnička knjiga, pp. 50–76, ISBN 953-212-168-4
- Mujanić, Samra (2021). "Osnovne fonološke i morfološke značajke govora Jezera u sjeverozapadnoj Bosni" [The influence of migrations on the Neoštokavian Ijekavian subdialects in the Neretva region and in lower Herzegovina]. Croatica et Slavica Iadertina (in Serbo-Croatian). 17 (2): 591–605. doi:10.15291/csi.3548. S2CID 248276419.
