= Southwestern Istrian =

Chakavian dialect of Istria

- Jugozapadni istarski dijalekt
- Region: Istria
- Language family: Indo-European: Balto-Slavic; Slavic; South Slavic; Western; Chakavian; Southwestern Istrian

Language codes
- ISO 639-3: –
- Glottolog: None

Southwestern Istrian (Croatian: Jugozapadni istarski dijalekt), also known as Chakavian-Shtokavian, Shtokavian-Chakavian, or Shtakavian-Chakavian ikavian (Croatian: čakavsko-štokavski/štokavsko-čakavski/štakavsko-čakavski ikavski dijalekt), is one of the dialects of the Chakavian language in Istria, Croatia. Through the history there were different hypotheses which classified it, besides in Chakavian, instead in Shtokavian, because it is a transitional dialect. It is the most widespread Chakavian dialect in Istria.

== Origin and history ==
The subdialect is a blend of Chakavian and Shtokavian elements, emerging in Istria after the 16th-century migration of speakers from Dalmatia, primarily from the hinterland of the Makarska Riviera. In this area, a predominantly Shtokavian dialect of Ikavian pronunciation and Chakavian features was spoken. As speakers relocated to the Šibenik-Zadar region, they assimilated additional Chakavian elements. It is believed that the area of origin was located inland, though not far from the coast.

This migration was driven by the Ottoman conquest of the Western Balkans, and Venice encouraged settlement in Istria due to the peninsula's low population density after late-medieval depopulation. Some scholars suggest that the territory around Zadar (Ravni Kotari) served as an intermediate migration point on the way to Istria. This subdialect shares a relationship with the Slavomolisano dialect of the Molise Croats from the Zabiokovlje region. However, it contains fewer Chakavian elements. Dialect transitions and boundaries vary across regions. Since the subdialect originated in the Dalmatian-Herzegovinian region, where Shtokavian elements initially predominated before additional Chakavian features were adopted, it is often regarded as a postmigrational or transitional subdialect.

According to linguist Josip Ribarić, the Chakavian features of the subdialect cannot be attributed to the influence of neighboring native Chakavian speakers in Istria, as the Northern Chakavian subdialect does not include these elements. He argued that the Southwestern Istrian dialect preserves a "reflection of the Shtokavian-Chakavian dialect spoken at the end of the 15th, during the 16th and the first half of the 17th century spoke on the Dalmatian mainland". Philologist Lina Pliško stated that "the main linguistic layer is Ikavian Chakavian from the Zadar hinterland, though it also preserves features of assimilated Ikavian Shtokavian speakers from the Makarska (Podbiokovlje) region, who migrated to Istria along with Ikavian Chakavian speakers. Additionally, some features of Ekavian Chakavian speakers (Northern Chakavian, Buzet dialect, and partly Middle Chakavian subdialect) were preserved."

The subdialect was first noted by Ribarić in 1916. In the second half of the 20th century, more Shtokavian elements were identified within the dialect, leading to its classification among the Shtokavian Ikavian subdialects—a thesis first proposed by Polish linguist Mieczysław Małecki (1930) and later supported primarily by Serbian linguists Aleksandar Belić, Pavle Ivić, and Radosav Bošković. However, in a comprehensive 1964 study, Mate Hraste concluded that Southwestern Istria "is not Shtokavian nor Shtokavian-Chakavian, as was called by Ribarić, but Chakavian-Shtokavian, because in it even today prevail Chakavian elements, and not Shtokavian. Shtokavian is only Premantura, Banjole, Vintijan, Vinkuran and Valdebek, although even in those places there are Čakavian adstrata which was introduced from the hinterland during the centuries to the present day. The language of all these places even today is mostly Chakavian".

Based on these findings, along with the work of Dalibor Brozović, Ivić argued in 1981 that if the subdialect is to be classified among Chakavian subdialects, it belongs to the Southeastern group of Chakavian subdialects.

== Speaking area ==
Istrian dialects location according to Dalibor Brozović. Southwestern Istrian in purple color.

According to Pliško, the subdialect is spoken "from the very South (Premantura), along the Western coast of Istria until the delta of river Mirna (Tar), along Eastern line Muntrilj – Kringa – Sveti Petar u Šumi – Kanfanar until Sveti Ivan in Višnjan, along Western coast of river Raša until Barban, then line Rakalj – Marčana – Muntić – Valtura – and South Jadreški – Šišan – Ližnjan – Medulin". This subdialect also includes the so-called Vodice oasis, a group of ten villages (Vodice, Jelovice, Dane, Trstenik, Rašpor, Črnehi in the municipality of Lanišće, and Golac, Brdo, Gojaki, and Zagrad in the municipality of Hrpelje-Kozina) in northeastern Istria (Ćićarija), located within both Croatia and Slovenia, as described by Ribarić.

The subdialect can be further divided into smaller units: the main area in the southwest, the Premantura area in the south, and the Vodice oasis in the northeast. Based on prosodic features like accent, rhythm, and intonation, it can also be classified into typological areas: central, border, northwestern, Vodice oasis, and southern.

== Main features ==
In this subdialect, the yat vowel appears as i (Ikavian), resulting in words like lip, divojka, mriža, and srića, in contrast to Shtokavian Ijekavian forms such as lijep, djevojka, mreža, and sreća. There is minimal use of Ekavian, primarily as a borrowing from neighboring Istrian Chakavian subdialects or from Slovenian dialects. It is predominantly Shtakavian (e.g., "ognjište", "dažditi"), although Shchakavian examples are also present. The Chakavian features reflect both southeastern and southwestern influences that were brought to and adopted in Istria.

Josip Lisac identifies specific features in the subdialect: "sequence w + yer give partly u- in Shtokavian way, which is also in Chakavian Southeast, for e.g. u, unuki. Partly is Vazam 'Uskrs', vajka 'uvijek', valje 'odmah', and that is Chakavian result, specifically Northwestern Chakavian subdialects. Final -l mainly regularly gives a, which is a Shtokavian feature, however, it is also well represented in Chakavian under strong influence of Shtokavian. Especially interesting are reflexes prsl. ď, was it j, đ, ď, ž, also type mlajži. Example of type mlaži actually are a Shtokavian result (dž) spoken in a Chakavian way. J is Chakavian represented in many Western Shtokavian dialects. Phoneme h mainly is well conserved, but there are also deviations ... Usually, it is everywhere except around Premantura conserved čr-, as it is common in Chakavian, exceptionally in Shtokavian. Usually are a regular short plural of single-word nouns of masculinity, as it is in Chakavian and Kajkavian, sometimes also in Shtokavian. Generally is said for e.g. dva kantuna, tri kantuni, četiri kantuni, as it is common in Chakavian. Characteristically are substitute words ča i zašto, ča probably as acquired feature, zašto as old. Distinct Chakavian element bin, biš, bi, bimo, bite, bi characterize the subdialect, even in Premantura in the South there's bimo and bite". Accentuation varies by location but shares certain commonalities. It features a three-tone system, while the Vodice oasis area has a two-tone system, except in the village of Trstenik, where a single-tone system is used, similar to the Buzet dialect.

The subdialect reflects a dialectal continuum between Western Shtokavian and Southern Chakavian, with internal divisions predating the 16th-century migrations to Istria. According to Lisac, it was initially formed "in the hinterland of Makarska Riviera. That's the territory where predominantly was spoken Shtokavian, slightly Chakavian, and main features are Štakavism and "-a" in verb adjective in working, along non-Neoshtokavian accentuation ... The place of origination was not located by the sea (because it would be Shchakavian), but also not very far from the sea (because it would have "-l" instead of "-a").

== Lexicon ==
It has more Italianisms (kampanja "polje", korta "dvorište") than in Dalmatia. Toward North of Istria and the boundary with Slovenian language area it also has some Germanisms (žajfa "sapun", gmajna "common pasture, commons", as in Slovene). The lexicon generally indicates to a common origin nevertheless on separated majority in Southwest and Vodice oasis in Northeast. There's a visible closeness to the dialect of Molise Croats in Italy. Vodice oasis also has some innovations recorded in Northern Chakavian, Burgenland Croatian, Kajkavian and Slovene dialects, but there are also many Chakavian autochthonisms.

== See also ==
- Čičarija dialect
- Slavomolisano dialect
