= Jakubinskij's law =

Chakavian sound law

Jakubinskij's law, or Meyer–Jakubinskij's law, is a sound law that operated in the Croatian Chakavian dialect in the 12th and 13th centuries, named after Lev Jakubinskij who discovered it in 1925, and sometimes also after K. H. Meyer who expanded and refined the rule in 1926.

Jakubinskij's law governs the distribution of the mixed Ikavian–Ekavian reflexes of Common Slavic yat phoneme, occurring in the Middle Chakavian area.

In the Southern Chakavian Ikavian area, yat */ě/ was reflected as /i/, and became merged with the reflexes of Common Slavic */y/ and */i/. In the northwest, however, according to the Meyer–Jakubinskij's law, */ě/ > /e/ before dental consonants {d, t, s, z, n, l, r} which were followed by one of the back vowels {a, o, u, y, ъ}, and elsewhere */ě/ > /i/. This /e/ has thus merged the reflexes of Common Slavic */e/ and */ę/.

Compare tȇlo 'body' as opposed to bīžéć 'fleeing'.

The effect of Jakubinskij's rule has been levelled out in paradigmatic alternations and derivational morphology, by the analogical influence of nominative form onto the oblique cases, infinitive on other verbal forms, word stem onto derivations etc. Thus no or extremely little alternation occurs throughout the inflectional paradigm. For example, Common Slavic *město 'place, position' would yield N sg mesto, but L pl is mestih, not **mistih. L sg of mera (< Comm Slavic *měra 'measure') is meri not **miri etc.

Though initially applied only to Chakavian Ikavian–Ekavian accents, this rule is also valid for some Kajkavian Ikavian–Ekavian accents of Duga Resa, Ogulin, Karlovac and Žumberak.

== In popular culture ==
In 2023, the webcomic Saturday Morning Breakfast Cereal poked fun at the law, implying a pronunciation pattern in a defunct dialect does not deserve a named scientific law.
