= Southeastern Chakavian =

Dialect of Serbo-Croatian

Southern Eastern Chakavian
- južnoistočni čakavski dijalekt
- Language family: Indo-European: Balto-Slavic; Slavic; South Slavic; Western; Chakavian; Southern Eastern Chakavian

Language codes
- ISO 639-3: –
- Glottolog: None

Southeastern Chakavian (Serbo-Croatian: južnoistočni čakavski dijalekt) or Ijekavian accent is a dialect of the Chakavian variety of Croatian. It is spoken by the peoples of the diaspora of Lastovo, and on the islands of Janjina on Pelješac, Bigova on the south of Montenegro.

The Ijekavian accent (Lastovo island, Janjina in Pelješac): */ě/ > /je/ or /ije/
