= Vatican Croatian Prayer Book =

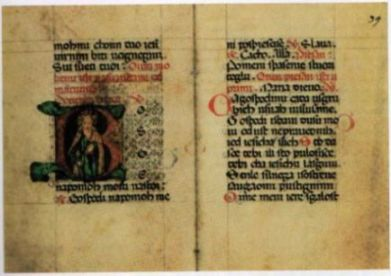
Vatican Croatian Prayer Book

The Vatican Croatian Prayer Book (Croatian: Vatikanski hrvatski molitvenik) is a Croatian vernacular prayer book and the example of Shtokavian vernacular literary dialect.

== History ==
Written between 1380 and 1400 in Dubrovnik as a transcript and transliteration from older texts composed in a mixture of Church Slavonic and Chakavian dialect and written down in Glagolitic with some Cyrillic script, it retained a few phonological and morphological features found in the original manuscripts. The book contains the following parts: Offices of the Virgin Mary according to the rites of the Roman Church; seven penitentiary psalms; Offices of the Holy Cross; Offices for the dead; Offices of the Holy Spirit as well as numerous prayers.

== Makeup ==
The script is the Roman Gothic, embroidered with luxuriantly outlined initials and miniatures. The name of the prayer book reflects the fact that it is held in the Vatican library. The text has become widely known from 1859, when influential Croatian historian Franjo Rački drew attention to it, but the first critical edition did not appear until 1934, published by Croatian literary historian and philologist Franjo Fancev.

The book's central importance lies in the fact that it is the first major Shtokavian dialect vernacular text. Although Proto-Shtokavian and mixed Church Slavonic-Shtokavian manuscripts are known to have appeared a century or two before, it is the first text in what can be termed a vernacular dialect. Analyses of the manuscript have shown that recorded morphological and phonological features are transient forms in the development of the dialect, but its syntax is quite archaic, especially compared to the idiom of later prayer books (the Croatian Prayer Book from 1450s, also from Dubrovnik and held in the library of Croatian Academy of Sciences and Arts, Zagreb) or the syntax of Marin Držić's dramas (early 16th century).

== Sources ==
- Fancev, Franjo; Gianelli, Ciro, eds. (1934). Vatikanski hrvatski molitvenik i Dubrovački psaltir; dva latinicom pisana spomenika hrvatske proze 14 i 15 vijeka (in Croatian). Zagreb: Yugoslav Academy of Sciences and Arts.
