= Syncretism (linguistics) =

Relation between words with different morphosyntactic features but identical form

In linguistics, syncretism (Note: Etymology: Greek συγκρητισμός.) exists when functionally distinct occurrences of a single lexeme, morph or phone are identical in form. The term arose in historical linguistics, referring to the convergence of morphological forms within inflectional paradigms. In such cases, a former distinction has been "syncretized". However, syncretism is also used to describe any situation where multiple syntactical features share the same inflectional marker, without implying a distinction ever existed. The term syncretism is often used when a fairly regular pattern can be observed across a paradigm.

Syncretism is a specific form of linguistic homophony. Homophony refers to any instance of two words or morphemes with the same pronunciation (form) but different meaning. Syncretism is a type of homophony that occurs within a specific paradigm in which the syntax would require separate forms. Accidental homophony does occur in paradigms, however, and linguist Sebastian Bank of the University of Leipzig makes the distinction between accidental homophony and syncretism in paradigms through natural classes. When a set of identical paradigmatic forms are connected by a feature in common, and a native speaker cannot tell the difference between the forms, this is said to be syncretism.

Syncretism can arise through either phonological or morphological change. Baerman et al. call these two sources of syncretism "blind phonological change" and "morphosyntactic readjustment". In the case of phonological change, originally distinct forms change to be pronounced identically, so that their distinctness is lost. Such change can often be observed in the modern German verb paradigm: the infinitive nehmen 'to take' comes from Old High German neman, the first person plural nehmen comes from nemēm, and the third person plural nehmen comes from nemant. This is also an example of syncretism manifested in lexemes.

Phonological change in the German verb paradigm
| | Old High German | → | Modern German |
|---|---|---|---|
| infinitive | neman | | nehmen |
| 1.PL | nemēm | | nehmen |
| 3.PL. | nemant | | nehmen |

Some scholars, according to Baerman et al., purport that blind phonological change should only be considered to yield homophony, not syncretism. This distinction between the two sources of syncretism is important in theory, but is harder to maintain de facto.

In the case of morphological change, one form stops being used and is replaced by the other. This change can be exemplified by the syncretism in Latin's third-declension nouns, whose nouns take the same form in nominative and vocative cases.

== Forms of syncretism ==
Baerman et al. identify three forms of syncretism. These are simple syncretism, nested syncretism, and contrary syncretism. Simple syncretism occurs when a minimum of two cells in a paradigm are syncretic. Nested syncretism occurs when more than two cells in a paradigm are syncretic to the same form. Contrary syncretism occurs when there are multiple cases of simple syncretism, in which each case in the paradigm of the simple syncretism is separate from the others.

Simple syncretism in English plural and singular you
| Person | Singular | Plural |
|---|---|---|
| 1st | I | We |
| 2nd | You | You |
| 3rd | He/She | They |

In the chart above a model of simple syncretism is shown in the singular and plural forms of the second person subject pronoun in English. There is another example in the chart of simple syncretism in the masculine and feminine third person plural subject pronouns, both realized as they. Together these two cases of syncretism are an example of contrary syncretism.

The chart below shows a model of nested syncretism, in which more than one cell in the paradigm of subjunctive verb conjugation in Brazilian Portuguese is realized as the same form, "seja."

Nested syncretism in Brazilian Portuguese subjunctive ser ('to be')
| Person | Singular | Plural |
|---|---|---|
| 1st | Eu seja | Nós sejamos |
| 2nd | Você seja | Vocês sejam |
| 3rd | Ele/Ela seja | Eles/Elas sejam |

Stump, in his 2001 book Inflectional Morphology: A Theory of Paradigm Structure, identifies four distinct types of syncretism. This model is called directional syncretism, as it refers to the direction in which the syncretism occurs and progresses. The four directions of syncretism are unidirectional, bidirectional, unstipulated, and symmetrical.

Unidirectional syncretism is the concept that the form of one cell in the paradigm is mapped onto another cell. This is exemplified through the exploration of accusative forms of neutral words in Indo-European languages. In Indo-European languages that have the neutral gender, the nominative and accusative forms of neuter words tend to be the same. The accusative case is the marked case (meaning the presence of accusative implies the presence of nominative, while the nominative case can exist in a language without the accusative), and so it can be assumed that the form of the nominative neuter word was mapped onto the accusative form. As in the Slovak word for "word", slovo, which is the same in both nominative and accusative, while masculine animate and feminine words change from case to case, as shown in the chart below.

Slovak grammatical gender and case
| Gender | Nominative form | Accusative form | English |
|---|---|---|---|
| Masc animate | pes | psa | 'dog' |
| Fem | žena | ženu | 'woman' |
| Neutr | slovo | slovo | 'word' |

Stump's next form of syncretism is bidirectional. This is similar to unidirectional, but differs in that in some cases the mapping is from one direction, and in other cases the mapping is from the other direction. This is exemplified in Russian in Genitive Singular and Nominative Plural forms. In some cases, it is realized as G.Sg → N.Pl and in other cases, it is realized as N.Pl → G.Sg.

Unstipulated syncretism occurs when syncretism occurs in a direction that is not quite so obvious, but the syncretized forms are connected by a natural class of feature. An example of this is the syncretism among German genitive and dative, masculine and neutral, nominal elements, where the only forms not syncretized in this paradigm are feminine, so the natural class is [-fem]. This is shown in the chart below.

Nominal elements in German genitive and dative cases
| Grammatical gender | Genitive | Dative |
|---|---|---|
| Masc | Des | Dem |
| Fem | Der | Der |
| Neutr | Des | Dem |

Another example of this is the syncretism among Japanese r-stem, s-stem and vowel-stem, and passive, causative, non-past, -ba conditional and potential, verbal elements, where the only forms not syncretized in this paradigm are causative, so the natural class is [-caus]. This is shown in the chart below.

Verbal elements in Japanese passive, causative, non-past, -ba conditional and potential forms
| Verb form | r-stem | s-stem | vowel-stem |
|---|---|---|---|
| Passive | かえられる kaerareru | はなされる hanasareru | みられる mirareru |
| Causative | かえらせる kaeraseru | はなさせる hanasaseru | みさせる misaseru |
| Causative Passive | かえらせられる kaeraserareru | はなさせられる hanasaserareru | みさせられる misaserareru |
| Non-past | かえる kaeru | はなす hanasu | みる miru |
| -ba conditional | かえれば kaereba | はなせば hanaseba | みれば mireba |
| Potential | かえれる kaereru | はなせる hanaseru | みられる mirareru みれる mireru (nonstandard) |

The final category in Stump's four type syncretism model is that of symmetrical syncretism. This category has the least defined boundaries, and is defined more as the syncretism that occurs when there is no directional syncretism and no evident natural class.

Dieter Wunderlich, in Explorations in Nominal Inflection argues against Stump's four-type syncretism model, asking "Is There Any Need for the Concept of Directional Syncretism?" Wunderlich proposes that all instances of supposed directional syncretism, be it uni-or bi-directional, are in actuality cases of unstipulated or symmetrical syncretism.

== English ==
In English, syncretism led to the loss of case marking and the stabilization of word order. For example, the nominative and accusative forms of you are the same, whereas he/him, she/her, etc., have different forms depending on grammatical case.

Another English example for syncretism can be observed in most English verb paradigms: there is no morphological distinction between the past participle and the passive participle, and, often, the past tense.

Syncretism in English verb paradigms
| | past tense | past participle | passive participle |
|---|---|---|---|
| to walk | walked | walked | walked |
| to win | won | won | won |

The syncretism observed here differs from the lexical syncretism observed in English personal pronouns in as much that the syncretism manifests itself in the suffix or stem change in the case of walked and won, respectively.

Another example of syncretism in English is the ending -/Z/, used to mark the possessive on all (singular) nouns and in most cases the plural and possessive plural, which though spelled differently (⟨'s⟩, ⟨s⟩, and ⟨s'⟩, respectively), have the same three variations in pronunciation, that is -/z/, (Note: after voiced consonants other than /z/ /ʒ/, and /dʒ/) -/ɪz/, (Note: after the sibilants /ʃ ʒ tʃ dʒ s z/) and -/s/. (Note: after other (non-sibilant) voiceless consonants.)

== Ingvaeonic languages ==
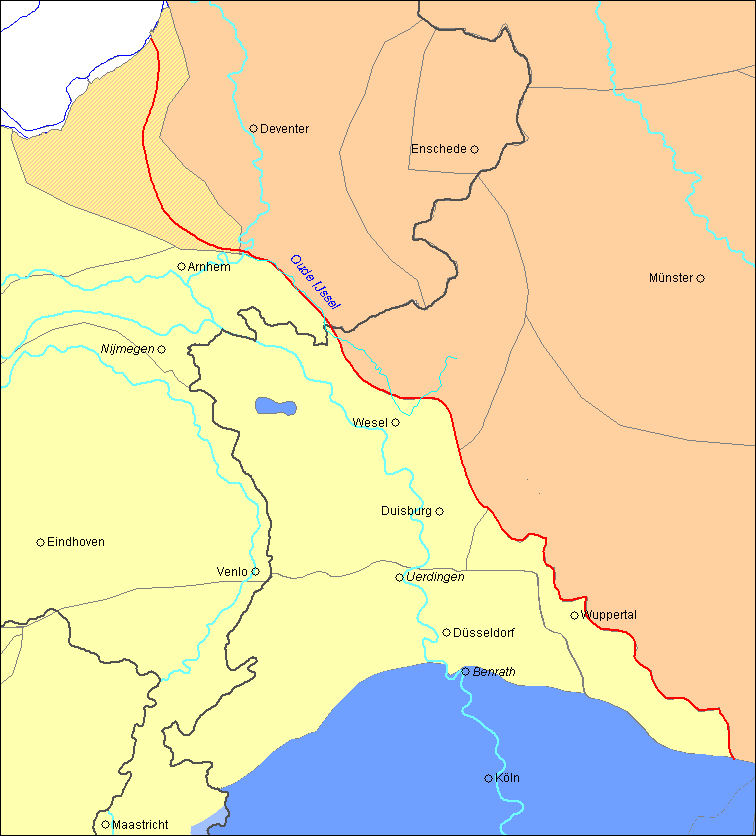
Dialects to the right of the line have one plural form, dialects to the south have two.

In the Ingvaeonic languages, a subgroup of the West Germanic languages, an important case of syncretism developed in the inflection of verbs, where the forms for the three plural persons became identical. Old English has wē habbaþ, ġē habbaþ and hīe habbaþ (we, you, they have) and Old Saxon has wī hebbiad, gī hebbiad and sia hebbiad, all with the same verb form. Such "unified plural" languages contrasted with the more southern Old Dutch and Old High German, which still had three distinct forms for each, e.g. OHG wīr habem, īr habet, siu habent. In the modern languages, this distinction remains an important isogloss separating Low German from Dutch and the High German languages.

== Latin ==
In Latin, the nominative and vocative of third-declension nouns have the same form (e.g. rēx 'king' is both nominative and vocative singular), distributing syncretism in case marking. Another observation is the distinction between dative and ablative, which is present in singular (e.g., puellae 'girl-DAT.SG' and puella 'girl-ABL.SG'), but not anymore in plural (e.g., puellis 'girl-DAT.PL/girl-ABL.PL').

== Other languages ==
In the Finnic languages, such as Finnish and Estonian, there is syncretism between the accusative and genitive singular case forms, and the nominative and accusative plural case forms.

== Bibliography ==
- Baerman, Matthew (2002). "Syncretism". Surrey Person Syncretism Database. University of Surrey. doi:10.15126/SMG.10/2.
- Baerman, Matthew; Dunstan Brown; Greville G. Corbett (2002). "Syncretism". Surrey Syncretisms Database. University of Surrey. doi:10.15126/SMG.10/1.
- Baerman, Matthew; Dunstan Brown; Greville G. Corbett (2005). The syntax-morphology interface: a study of syncretism. Cambridge: Cambridge University Press. ISBN 978-0-521-82181-0.
