= Buzet dialect =

Chakavian subdialect in Croatia

- buzetski dijalekt
- Language family: Indo-European: Balto-Slavic; Slavic; South Slavic; Western; Chakavian; Buzet dialect

Language codes
- ISO 639-3: –
- Glottolog: None
- IETF: ckm-u-sd-hr18

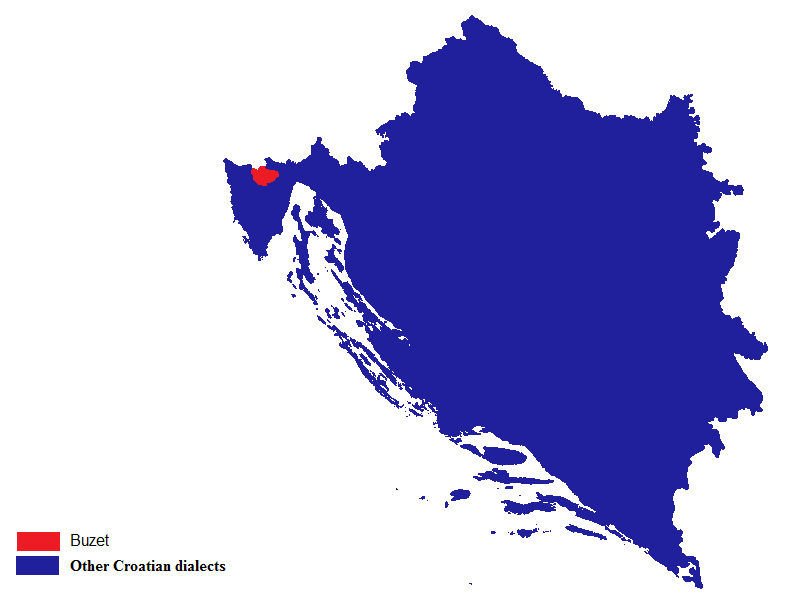
Map of Buzet dialect speakers in Croatia

The Buzet dialect (Croatian: buzetski dijalekt; also known as buzetsko-gornjomiranski or gornjomiranski) is a sub-dialect of the Chakavian dialect in Croatia. It is spoken in northern Istria around Buzet.

The Buzet dialect is a natural transition between Chakavian, Kajkavian and the Slovenian language. Initially some considered it part of the Kajkavian language area, in the past it was also classified (e.g. by Fran Ramovš) as a Slovene dialect, but other linguists, including Mieczysław Małecki and Pavle Ivić among others, managed to rightly define it as Chakavian and part of the literary Serbo-Croatian language.

The primary features that separate the Buzet dialect from the rest of the Chakavian dialects are in the development of the Common Slavic vocalism:

- */ě/ > /ẹ/ (closed e)
- */e/, */ę/ > opened e (just like in most Kajkavian speeches)
- */u/ > /ü/
- syllabic */l/ > /u/
- */ǫ/ > /a/

The prosodical system diverges from that of other Chakavian speeches (having lost, for example, the difference between long and short accented vowels). Another unusual feature is the usage of Kajkavian interrogative pronoun kaj "what", instead of the usual Chakavian ča.

As far as the division of Chakavian dialects in Southeastern and Northwestern is concerned, Buzet dialect belongs to Northwestern Chakavian. The Buzet dialect can be divided into two sub-dialects, Northern (majority) and Southern (minority).
