= Northern Chakavian =

Chakavian dialect

- sjevernočakavski dijalekt
- Language family: Indo-European: Balto-Slavic; Slavic; South Slavic; Western South Slavic; Chakavian; Northern Chakavian

Language codes
- ISO 639-3: –
- Glottolog: None

Northern Chakavian (Croatian: sjevernočakavski dijalekt) is a dialect of the Chakavian variety of Croatian. It is spoken in eastern Istria, outskirts of Žminj and Pazin, Croatian Littoral up to Bakar, on the islands of Cres and northern Lošinj, north of Central Chakavian.

The speech of the major Croatian city Rijeka used to belong to this dialect, but under the influence of Shtokavian immigrants a local idiom developed that lost most of the characteristical Chakavian features.

In this dialect Common Slavic yat phoneme yielded /e/, and only exceptionally /i/ (e.g. divõjka 'maiden, girl' < Common Slavic *děvojka).
