= Stjepan Ivšić =

Croatian linguist, Slavicist and accentologist

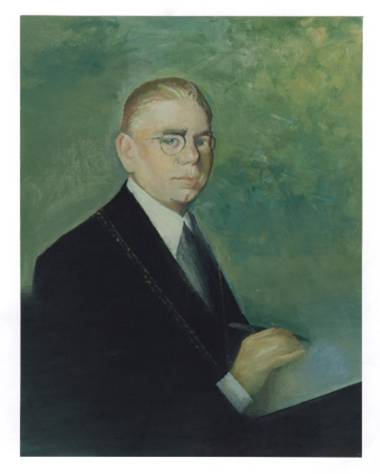
- A portrait of Stjepan Ivšić by an unknown artist at the council chambers of the University of Zagreb, c. 1940s
- Born: August 13, 1884; Orahovica, Kingdom of Croatia-Slavonia, Austria-Hungary (now Orahovica, Croatia)
- Died: January 14, 1962 (aged 77); Zagreb, SFR Yugoslavia (now Zagreb, Croatia)
- Occupations: Linguist, accentologist
- Known for: Ivšić's law

Stjepan Ivšić (Croatian pronunciation: [stjêpaːn ǐːʋʃitɕ]; 13 August 1884 – 14 January 1962) was a Croatian linguist, Slavicist, and accentologist.

== Biography ==
Ivšić was born on 13 August 1884 in Orahovica. After finishing primary school in Orahovica, he attended Gymnasium (secondary school) in Osijek and in Požega. At the Faculty of Philosophy at the University of Zagreb he studied Croatian and classical philology, and later specialized at the universities in Kraków, Prague, Saint Petersburg, Moscow, and Kyiv. He received his Ph.D. in 1913 with the thesis Prilog za slavenski akcenat (A Contribution on the Slavic Accent). He served as a professor at the secondary school in Gornji Grad in Zagreb from 1909 to 1915, and thenceforth as a professor of Slavic Studies at the Faculty of Philosophy in Zagreb.

The focal point of Ivšić's research was Croatian Štokavian subdialects, on which he published several very important studies (Šaptinovačko narječje, 1907; Današnji posavski govor, 1913). He was especially interested in the accentuation of Croatian subdialects and Old Slavic grammars. He was the first to determine the existence of the neoacute in all three Croatian dialects.

In 1928, he participated in the efforts of state committee to create a common orthography for Croatian and Serbian. In the paper Jezik Hrvata kajkavaca (1936), he partitioned dialects of Kajkavian language (not including the goranski subdialects ) into four major groups. He extensively studied Croatian Glagolitic heritage, especially its special language features, on which he published several works. In 1934, he tracked the Baška tablet from Krk to Zagreb and wrote an enthusiastic article about it called Sveta Lucija u Jurandvoru i njezin dragi kamen (Jutarnji list, 1934). In 1937, he became the vice president of the Croatian Language Society, and in 1938 the editor of the journal Hrvatski jezik (Croatian Language). He served as the chancellor of the University of Zagreb from 1939 to 1943. During the period of the fascist Independent State of Croatia, he refused an offer to serve as the head of the Croatian State Office for Language and advocated a phonology-based orthography as opposed to the official etymological-morphological one (known as korienski 'root').

He died in Zagreb on 14 January 1962, at the age of 77.

== Legacy ==
In the spring of 1945, due to alleged collaboration with the enemy, he was sentenced to exile from Zagreb and lost his membership in the Academy of Sciences and Arts. He was the only one to sign the conclusion of Novi Sad agreement, with the note "I give this signature with the remark that the statement in Act 4 of the conclusion cannot be used for promoting Ekavian pronunciation in the present-day Ijekavian area."

A high school in Ivšić's native Orahovica bears his name.

== Works ==
- Srpsko-hrvatski jezik. Izgovor i intonacija s recitacijama na pločama (with M. Kravar; Zagreb, 1955)
- Slavenska poredbena gramatika (prepared by R. Katičić and J. Vrana, Zagreb, 1970)
- Izabrana djela iz slavenske akcentuacije (prepared by B. Finka, Munich, 1971)
- Jezik Hrvata kajkavaca (prepared by J. Lisac, Zaprešić, 1996)

== See also ==
- Ivšić's law

Academic offices
Preceded by Andrija Živković	Rector of the University of Zagreb; 1940–1943	Succeeded by Božidar Špišić
