= Southern Chakavian =

Chakavian variety of Croatian

- južnočakavski dijalekt
- Language family: Indo-European: Balto-Slavic; Slavic; South Slavic; Western; Chakavian; Southern Chakavian

Language codes
- ISO 639-3: –
- Glottolog: None

Southern Chakavian (Croatian: južnočakavski dijalekt) or Ikavian Chakavian is a dialect of the Chakavian variety of Croatian. It is spoken in the area south of the Central Chakavian area, in a narrow strip of Dalmatian littoral and the neighbouring islands: outskirts of Split and Zadar; Korčula, Pelješac, Brač, Hvar, Vis and Šolta. It is also present in the Northwestern part of Istria.

The speech of Split originally belonged to this dialect, but under the influence of Shtokavian immigrants and the standard Croatian promoted by state media, a local variant developed that has lost many of the characteristic Chakavian traits, even though part of the older population retains Chakavian in their speech.

Much speech in this dialect mixes Chakavian and Shtokavian features. It is assumed that, in the past, this dialect covered a larger territory in the hinterland, gradually being suppressed by constant migrations that brought Shtokavian speech at its expense.

Common Slavic yat phoneme had a reflex of /i/ in this dialect. Thus we have lip, divojka, mriža, as opposed to Standard Croatian (Neo-Shtokavian) lijȇp', djèvōjka, mrȅža, all descending from earlier Proto-West-South-Slavic forms *lěpъ, *děvojka, *mrěža.

Slavomolisano dialect, as well Southwestern Istrian, which are mostly or partly Western Shtokavian (šća and šta) with an Ikavian accent, have a massive Southern Chakavian adstratum.

Even within the dialect, the subdialects show some significant phonological differences. As spoken on Vis, Alveolo-palatal sibilants are found (as well as a myriad of unique words not present within other subdialects), which are not present as distinct phonemes outside of affricates in any other form of Serbo-Croatian besides the Shtokavian Zeta–Raška dialect. As spoken on Bibinje in Zadar, Žirje Island, Drvenik Veli Island, Slatine in Čiovo, Stomorska in Šolta, and Dugi Rat, l-participles where final <l> corresponds to Shtokavian <o> end with <ja>, whereas in other areas nearby, <l> is sporadically dropped.
