= Bigova =

Bigova Бигова
- Village
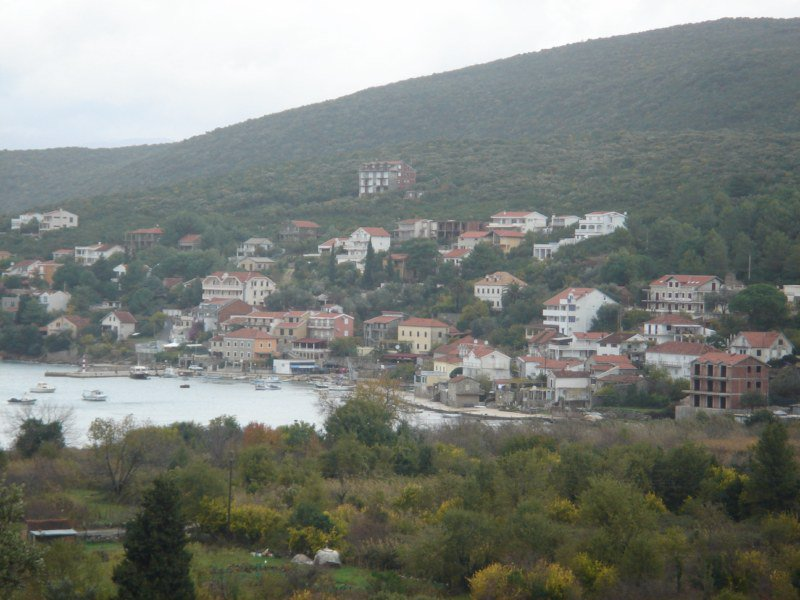
- Bigova

- Location within Montenegro
- Coordinates: 42.356906°N 18.704175°E
- Country: Montenegro
- Region: Coastal
- Municipality: Kotor

Population (2011)
  - Total: 101
- Time zone: UTC+1 (CET)
  - Summer (DST): UTC+2 (CEST)

Bigova (Montenegrin: Бигова) is a village in the municipality of Kotor, Montenegro.

== Demographics ==
According to the 2011 census, its population was 101.

Ethnicity in 2011
Ethnicity	Number	Percentage
Serbs	83	82.2%
Montenegrins	9	8.9%
other/undeclared	9	8.9%
Total	101	100%
