= Josip Lisac =

Croatian linguist and dialectologist

Josip Lisac (Croatian pronunciation: [jǒsip lǐːsat͡s]; born 23 November 1950) is a Croatian linguist and dialectologist.

== Biography ==
Lisac was born in 1950 in Gornji Turni near Delnice, Gorski Kotar. After graduating in philosophy and Yugoslav studies at the University of Zadar in 1974, he received a PhD at the same institution in 1986, with a thesis on the Kajkavian dialects of Gorski Kotar.

In 1978, after working as a journalist for four years immediately after graduation, he returned to the Faculty of Philosophy in Zadar to work as an assistant. In 1987, he received the title of docent. In 1989, he became an associate professor, and, in 1997, received regular professorship followed by permanent professorship in 2002. He teaches or has taught several post-graduate courses on linguistics, and serves as a head of the post-graduate course in linguistics at the University of Zadar. At the same university, he was the first head of the Department for Croatian and Slavic Studies. In 2004, he became an associate member of the Croatian Academy of Sciences and Arts.

== Work ==
His chief scientific interest is in dialectology and in the history of Croatian. He contributed to several international projects on linguistic geography. He has published approximately a thousand bibliographical units, including (incomplete):

- "Refleksi jata u jeziku J. Barakovića u usporedbi s jezikom P. Zoranića". Zadarska revija. Jurju Barakoviću o tristopedesetoj obljetnici smrti: 39–59. 1979.
- "O Ivanu Muvrinu -- u povodu pete obljetnice smrti". Istra. 19 (7–8): 116–117. 1979. ISSN 0350-4026.
- "O jeziku Goranove kajkavske zbirke Ognji i rože". Radovi Filozofskog fakulteta u Zadru, razdio filoloških znanosti. 19 (11) (published 1980): 45–59. 1999. ISSN 0352-6712.
- Fonološki opisi srpskohrvatskih / hrvatskosrpskih, slovenačkih i makedonskih govora obuhvaćenih Opšteslovenskim lingvističkim atlasom, Sarajevo, 1981 (as a contributor)
- "Oko problema prvog spomena naziva Delnica". Istra. 20 (3–4): 147–150. 1982. ISSN 0350-4026.
- "Jezik goranske dijalektalne književnosti (Prilog jezičnoj problematici hrvatske literarne novokajkavštine)". Radovi Filozofskog fakulteta u Zadru, razdio filoloških znanosti. 21(12) (13) (published 1983): 41–88. 1981–1982 [received 1982-12-15]. ISSN 0352-6712.
- "Gorski kotar u svjetlu najnovijih istraživanja (Uz tri nove monografije)". Dometi. 15 (8–9) (published 1983): 126–134. 1982. ISSN 0419-6252.
- Hrvatska drama do narodnog preporoda (co-authored with Slobodan Prosperov Novak), I-II, Split, 1984
- "Susret čakavskog, štokavskog i kajkavskog narječja". Fužine: Lič, Vrata, Belo Selo, Slavica, Benkovac. 1985. pp. 73–75. ISBN 86-7071-039-0.
- Delnički govor i govor Gornjih Turni u svjetlosti goranskih kajkavskih govora (Thesis). Zadar: Sveučilište u Zadru, Filozofski fakultet. 1986.
- "Iz sociolingvističke problematike goranskih kajkavskih govora". Radovi Filozofskog fakulteta u Zadru, razdio filoloških znanosti. 25 (15): 37–44. 1986 [received 1986-02-26]. ISSN 0352-6712.
  - Revisited in "Sociolingvistička situacija u Gorskom kotaru". Hrvatski govori, filolozi, pisci. 1999. ISBN 953-150-525-X. Reviews:.
- "Iz goranskoga vokalizma". Зборник Матице српске за филологију и лингвистику. 31 (2): 137–175. 1988. ISSN 0514-6143.
- "Prozodija goranskih kajkavaca". Radovi Akademije nauka i umjetnosti Bosne i Hercegovine. 84: 241–249. 1989.
- "Goransko predmigracijsko dijalektno stanje i podrijetlo suvremenih organskih idioma u Gorskom kotaru". Dometi. 24 (6/7): 381–386. 1991. ISSN 0419-6252.
- "Goranski konsonantizam u kajkavskom kontekstu". Fluminensia: časopis za filološka istraživanja. 4 (2): 83–87. 1992-01-27. ISSN 0353-4642.
- "Osnovne sintaktičke značajke goranskih kajkavaca u sklopu cjeline narječja". Radovi Filozofskog fakulteta u Zadru, razdio filoloških znanosti. 30 (20) (published 1992): 31–41. 1990–1991 [received 1991-12-28]. ISSN 0352-6712.
- "Konsonantizam goranskih i ostalih kajkavaca". Radovi Filozofskog fakulteta u Zadru, razdio filoloških znanosti. 31 (21) (published 1992): 63–90. 1991–1992 [received 1991-09-10]. ISSN 0352-6712.
- Hrvatski jezik i njegovi proučavatelji, Split, 1994.
- "Strohalovi pogledi o genezi kajkavštine s osobitim obzirom na područje Gorskoga kotara". Hrvatski dijalektološki zbornik (9): 45–52. 1995. ISSN 0439-691X.
- Hrvatski dijalekti i jezična povijest, Zagreb, 1996.
- "Kazalijev jezik". Jezik: Periodical for the Culture of the Standard Croatian Language. 44 (3): 95–103. 1996. ISSN 0021-6925.
- Poezija Dragutina Domjanića; Z mojih bregov Frana Galovića; Ognji i rože Ivana Gorana Kovačića (with Miroslav Šicel and Dunja Detoni-Dujmić), Zagreb, 1996
- "Goransko dijalektno stanje u prošlosti i u sadanjosti". Hrvatski dijalektološki zbornik (1): 155–161. 1997. ISSN 0439-691X.
- "Mjesto dijalektalne književnosti u viđenjima Vinka Nikolića". Vinko Nikolić: 85 godina. 1997. pp. 29–35. ISBN 953-6163-36-5.
- "Sličnosti i razlike bednjanskog govora i štajerskih dijalekatnih idioma". Kaj: časopis za književnost, umjetnost i kulturu. 30 (5–6): 31–40. 1997. ISSN 0453-1116.
- Reprinted as "Sličnosti i razlike bednjanskoga govora i štajerskih dijalekatnih idioma". Hrvatski govori, filolozi, pisci. 1999. ISBN 953-150-525-X. Reviews:.
- "Dijalekatno stanje na otoku Ižu". Hrvatski govori, filolozi, pisci. 1999. ISBN 953-150-525-X. Reviews:.
- "Jezik hrvatskih protestantskih pisaca u obradbi Franje Fanceva". Zbornik o Franji Fancevu. 1998 [presented March 1997]. pp. 89–99. ISBN 953-96165-9-X.
- "Jat u hrvatskim dijalektima". Hrvatski govori, filolozi, pisci. 1999. ISBN 953-150-525-X. Reviews:.
- "Čakavština i njena proučavanja". Hrvatski govori, filolozi, pisci. 1999. ISBN 953-150-525-X. Reviews:.
- "Ravnogorska kajkavština i goranski dijalekt". Hrvatski govori, filolozi, pisci. 1999. ISBN 953-150-525-X. Reviews:.
- "Jezično stanje zadarskoga područja". Hrvatski govori, filolozi, pisci. 1999. ISBN 953-150-525-X. Reviews:.
- "Hrvatsko-slovensko granično dijalekatno stanje". Hrvatski govori, filolozi, pisci. 1999. ISBN 953-150-525-X. Reviews:.
- "Jezik hrvatskih protestantskih pisaca u obradbi Franje Fanceva". Hrvatski govori, filolozi, pisci. 1999. ISBN 953-150-525-X. Reviews:.
  - "Mjesto dijalektalne književnosti u obradbi Vinka Nikolića". Hrvatski govori, filolozi, pisci. 1999. ISBN 953-150-525-X. Reviews:.
- "Povijesna podloga goranskoga dijalekatnog stanja". Radovi Filozofskog fakulteta u Zadru, razdio filoloških znanosti. 36(26) (11) (published 1999): 51–61. 1997 [received 1999-05-15]. ISSN 0352-6712.
  - Reprinted as "Povijesna podloga goranskoga dijalekatnog stanja". Zbornik Stjepanu Antoljaku u čast. 2003. pp. 137–148. ISBN 953-6005-56-5.
- Hrvatski govori, filolozi, pisci, Zagreb, 1999
- "Uz Matićevu obradbu Jakova Pletikose". Hrvatski govori, filolozi, pisci. 1999. ISBN 953-150-525-X. Reviews:.
- "Uz Matićevu obradbu Jakova Pletikose". Znanstvena djelatnost Tome Matića. 1999. pp. 207–211.
- "Položaj privlačkoga govora među hrvatskim idiomima". Hrvatski govori, filolozi, pisci. 1999. ISBN 953-150-525-X. Reviews:.
- "Ruralno i urbano stanje hrvatskih dijalekata". Hrvatski govori, filolozi, pisci. 1999. ISBN 953-150-525-X. Reviews:.
- "Osnovne značajke brodskoga govora". Kaj: 25–36. 2000. ISSN 0453-1116.
- Dalibor Brozović, dobitnik nagrade "Stjepan Ivšić, Zagreb - Zadar, 2002
- Hrvatska dijalektologija 1. Hrvatski dijalekti i govori štokavskog narječja i hrvatski govori torlačkog narječja, Zagreb, 2003
- "Hrvatski jezik 18. stoljeća i Jakov Pletikosa". Kolo. 12 (4): 286–289. 2003 [received 2002]. ISSN 0023-2920.
- Faust Vrančić i drugi, Šibenik, 2004
- "Goranska kajkavština i goranski pisci". Hrvatski sjever. 9 (1–4): 43–47. 2004. ISSN 1330-9625.
- "Hrvatski filolog Nikola Majnarić (1885–1966)". Kolo (2). 2005. ISSN 1331-0992.
- Tragom zavičaja: delnički govor i govor gornjih Turni u svjetlosti goranskih kajkavskih govora. Split. 2006. ISBN 953-163-194-8.
- "Goranska kajkavština i goranska dijalektalna književnost". Kaj: časopis za književnost, umjetnost, kulturu. 39 (4): 23–29. 2006. ISSN 0453-1116.
- "Toponim Delnice". Folia onomastica Croatica (12/13): 299–301. 2007-03-28. ISSN 1848-7858.
- "Koji bi nam dijalekatni rječnici bili najpotrebniji?". Hrvatski dijalektološki zbornik (14): 207–217. 2008-07-14. ISSN 0439-691X.
- Hrvatska dijalektologija 2 - Čakavsko narječje, Zagreb, 2009
- "Zoranićev jezik i jezik hrvatske renesansne književnosti u Zadru". Kolo. 313 (3–4). Matica hrvatska. 2009. eISSN 1334-0522. Archived from the original on 2020-08-13.
- "Dalibor Brozović i jezik bosanskih franjevaca". Dubrovnik: časopis za književnost i znanost. 23 (4): 197–201. 2012. ISSN 0353-8559.
- "Brodski govor". Brod na Kupi i gornja kupska dolina u ozračju povijesnih mijena. 2012. pp. 421–435. ISBN 978-953-55255-1-6.
- "Hrvatski govori u Vojvodini". Godišnjak za znanstvena istraživanja. 4: 153–161. 2012. ISSN 2217-5393.
  - Presented as "Ugroženo jezično blago: Hrvatski govori u Vojvodini". Vijenac. 490. 2012-12-13. eISSN 1333-9249.
- "Dijalektalna književnost zadarskoga područja u sklopu hrvatske literature". Čakavska rič: Polugodišnjak za proučavanje čakavske riječi. 40 (1–2): 5–11. 2012-11-28. eISSN 1849-1081.
- "Govor Veloga Rata". Veli Rat. 2013. pp. 667–671. ISBN 978-953-331-047-3.
- "Hrvatski jezik Vrančićeva rječnika i njegove proze". Filologija (59) (published 2013-12-03): https://hrcak.srce.hr/98086. 2012. ISSN 1848-8919.
- "Kako se na zadarskom području govorilo potkraj srednjega vijeka". Zadarska smotra: časopis za kulturu, znanost i umjetnost. 52 (4): 149–142. 2013.
- "Istočnobosanski dijalekt i njegova geneza". Od indoeuropeistike do kroatistike. 2013. pp. 243–246. ISBN 978-953-154-692-8.
- "Hrvatska narječja u 17. i 18. stoljeću". Povijest hrvatskoga jezika. 2013. pp. 77–93. ISBN 978-953-55540-3-5.
- "Serafin Mičić i Jerko Kraljev kao čakavski pisci zadarskoga područja u prvoj polovici 20. stoljeća". Čakavska rič: polugodišnjak za proučavanje čakavske riječi. 41 (1–2): 82–93. 2013-11-11. eISSN 1849-1081.
- "Čakavština kao jezik hrvatske pismenosti i književnosti od srednjega vijeka do danas". Dubrovnik: časopis za književnost i znanost. 24 (1): 203–207. 2013. ISSN 0353-8559.
  - Reprinted as "Čakavština kao jezik hrvatske pismenosti i književnosti od srednjega vijeka do danas". Croatica et Slavica Iadertina. 9/1 (9): 31–37. 2014-01-10. eISSN 1849-0131.
- "Šibenska jezična i književna baština". Čakavska rič: Polugodišnjak za proučavanje čakavske riječ. 42 (1–2): 43–50. 2014-12-09. eISSN 1849-1081.
- "Šime Starčević i novoštokavski ikavski dijalekt". Šime Starčević i hrvatska kultura u 19. stoljeću. 2014. pp. 177–182.
- "Današnji posavski govor Stjepana Ivšića i sadanji hrvatski dijalektološki zadatci". Domaća rič: 15–19. 2014. ISBN 978-953-247-067-3.
- "Prošlost i suvremeno dijalekatno stanje na biogradskom području". Studia Borysiana: 475–482. 2014. ISBN 978-83-64031-07-6.
- "Vrančićev predgovor u Lodereckerovu rječniku". Vita Litterarum Studiis Sacra: Zbornik u čast Radoslavu Katičiću. 2014. pp. 213–223. ISBN 978-953-175-529-0.
- "Dijalekatno stanje na biogradskom području". Glagoljica i glagoljaštvo u biogradskom kraju. 2014. pp. 167–174. ISBN 978-953-247-038-3. Reviews:.
- "Govor otoka Vira i njegov leksik". Čakavska rič: Polugodišnjak za proučavanje čakavske riječi. 43 (1–2): 5–30. 2015. eISSN 1849-1081.
- Galić, Josip; Lisac, Josip (2016). "Virski govor". Otok Vir. pp. 465–474. ISBN 978-953-331-107-4.
- Galić, Josip; Lisac, Josip (2016). "Čakavština Milene Rakvin Mišlov i kaljski govor". Hrvatski dijalektološki zbornik (20): 57–78. eISSN 2459-4849.
- Lisac, Josip; Galić, Josip (2017-09-01). "Kajkavski govori u okolici Jastrebarskog: Petrovina i Domagović". Hrvatski dijalektološki zbornik (21): 129–145. eISSN 2459-4849.
- Lisac, Josip; Tomelić Ćurlin, Marijana (2017) [presented 2014-03-25]. "Govori vranskoga kraja". Braća Vranjani i vransko područje tijekom povijesti: zbornik radov. pp. 485–495. ISBN 978-953-247-109-0.
- Lisac, Josip; Magaš, Ivan (2018). "Polački govor". Zadarska smotra: časopis za kulturu, znanost i umjetnost. 67 (1–3): 123–128. ISSN 1330-4577.
- "Uz istraživanje i proučavanje hrvatskih karaševskih govora". Domaća rič (in Serbo-Croatian). 13: 213–222. 2019.
- Lisac, Josip; Magaš, Ivan (2020). "Polački govor". Polački kraj u prošlosti i sadašnjosti. pp. 583–590. ISBN 978-953-247-136-6.
- Lisac, Josip; Magaš, Ivan (2022) [written 2017]. "Starigradski govor". Starigrad-Paklenica. pp. 448–459. ISBN 978-953-331-365-8.

With Dunja Fališevac and Darko Novaković, Lisac edited the anthology Hrvatska književna baština (2002–2005). At the University of Zadar, he was the initiator and the editor-in-chief of the journal Croatica et Slavica Iadertina. He currently serves as an editor of the magazine Čakavska rič and also collaborates on the publications of the Miroslav Krleža Lexicographical Institute. He edited reprints of many of the works of Croatian writers and philologists, including (Faust Vrančić, Jakov Pletikosa, Stjepan Ivšić, Vinko Nikolić, Zlatko Pochobradsky). In collaboration with sister Terezija Zemljić, he published a chronicle of Šibenik's female Franciscans Knjigu od uspomene (Šibenik, 2005).

=== Reviews ===
- Małecki, Mieczysław (1930). Przegląd słowiańskich gwar Istrji. Prace Komisji Językowej Polskiej Akademii Umiejętności. Vol. 17. Translated as Małecki, Mieczysław (2002). Slavenski govori u Istri. Translated by Kryżan-Stanojević, Barbara. ISBN 953-6050-37-4. Translation republished as Małecki, Mieczysław (2007). "Slavenski govori u Istri". Čakavske studije Mieczysława Małeckoga. Translated by Kryżan-Stanojević, Barbara. pp. 158–164. ISBN 978-953-7029-06-7.
  - Review: Lisac, Josip (2007-11-30). "ČAKAVSKE STUDIJE MIECZYSŁAWA MAŁECKOGA (Mieczysław Małecki: ČAKAVSKE STUDIJE, Maveda, Rijeka, 2007.)". Čakavska rič: Polugodišnjak za proučavanje čakavske riječi. 35 (2): 431–432. ISSN 0350-7831.
- Barac-Grum, Vida; Finka, Božidar (1981). "Govori i nazivlje". Gorski kotar. pp. 418–431.
- Bujan-Kovačević, Zlata (1999). Fužinarski kaj. ISBN 953-97573-1-2.
- Bujan-Kovačević, Zlata; Polak, Silvija (2004). Ni ke kaj kan klast. ISBN 953-97573-7-1.
  - Review: Lisac, Josip (1989-03-13). "Problem obrađenosti leksika goranskih govora". Hrvatski dijalektološki zbornik (8): 61–68. ISSN 0439-691X.
- Burić, Antun (1983). Povijesna antroponimija Gorskog kotara u Hrvatskoj 1438-1975: goranska prezimena kroz povijest (2nd ed.). Rijeka: Društvo za zaštitu prirodne kulture i povijesne baštine Gorskog kotara, 🖶 Liburnija.
  - Review: Lisac, Josip (1985-06-24). "Novo izdanje o goranskim prezimenima". Filologija (13): 241–250. ISSN 0449-363X.
- Радан, Миља Н.; Ускату, Миљана Радмила (2011). "Нови прилог карашевској крсној слави" [A new contribution regarding the Karašovan celebration of the patron saint] (PDF). Темишварски зборник. 6. Novi Sad: 91–142. ISSN 0354-6721.
  - Review: Lisac, Josip (2012-09-06). "Karaševci nisu ekavci". Vijenac (482). eISSN 1333-9249.
- Božidar, Šimunić (2013). Rječnik bibinjskoga govora. ISBN 978-953-247-088-8.
  - Review: Lisac, Josip (2014). "Bibinjski rječnik". Vijenac: novine Matice hrvatske za književnost, umjetnost i znanost (529): 15. ISSN 1330-2787.
- Smoljan, Ante (2013). Rječnik govora otoka Ista. ISBN 978-953-247-085-7.
  - Review: Lisac, Josip (2014). "Vrijedni išćunski rječnik: Ante Smoljan, Rječnik govora otoka Ista, Ogranak Matice hrvatske u Zadru, Zadar, 2013". Mogućnosti: časopis za književnost, umjetnost i kulturne probleme. 61 (1/3): 149. ISSN 0544-7267.
