= Stefan Geosits =

Austrian Catholic priest and historian (1927–2022)

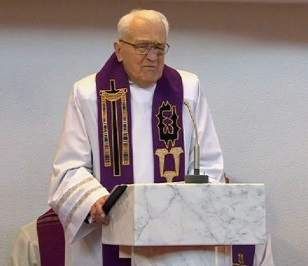
- Stefan Geosits in 2015
- Born: 27 August 1927; Szentpéterfa, Vas County, Hungary
- Died: 20 June 2022 (aged 94)
- Other names: Štefan Geošić; Geosits István
- Occupations: Parish priest; Theatre manager; Translator; Writer; Historian
- Awards: Culture Prize of Burgenland Croats

Stefan Geosits (Croatian: Štefan Geošić, Hungarian: Geosits István; 27 August 1927 – 20 June 2022) was a Burgenland Croatian Catholic priest in Austria, who worked as a lay theatre manager and director, translator, writer and historian.

== Life ==
Geosits was born in Szentpéterfa, Vas County, Hungary. In his birthplace he finished elementary school. He completed studies in Szombathely and Vienna in 1952, and then was chaplain of Croatian settlements in Nikitsch, Parndorf and Kroatisch Minihof, all in Burgenland. From 1955, he studied further in Rome and Jerusalem.

Since 1958 Geosits was the parish priest in Klingenbach. He built a parish hall, and expanded the cemetery with a new chapel, consecrated in 1967. He initiated a new church building in 1972, heading for a consecration in 1976, when the parish celebrated its 700th jubilee. The project caused controversy, but the new building, with the old tower retained, was consecrated in 1976.

In Klingenbach, he also immediately founded and headed an amateur Croatian theater group in 1958, translating plays and directing productions. He authored and edited many publications, monographies and religious books in Croatian, German and Hungaria. He was the first to translate the Bible completely into contemporary Burgenland Croatian, working on it over 20 years. The completes books were presented to the public at Schloss Eszterhazy in Eisenstadt in 2014. Geosits received the 2014 culture prize of Burgenland Croats, honouring the translation and his life achievements for religion, culture and understanding among the ethnic groups of the region.

Geosits died in Klingenbach on 20 June 2022, at the age of 94.

== Publications ==
- 700 Jahre St. Jakobskirche und Pfarre Klingenbach (1976) OCLC 499932005
- Die burgenländischen Kroaten im Wandel der Zeit (1986) ISBN 978-3-85063-160-0
- Ergebnisse der Volkszählungen 1900–1981 (1986)
- Knjiga mudrosti (1996)
- Szentpéterfa = Petrovo Selo = Prostrum: 1221-1996 (1996)
- Vjerovati i živiti (2010) ISBN 978-3-85013-545-0
- Biblija na gradišćanskohrvatskom jeziku (2014; 5 vol.)
