= Simon Knéfacz =

Simon Knéfacz, or Simeon Knéfacz, alternative names Kniefacz, Šimon Knefac, Šimeon Kniefac (February 23, 1752 – August 3, 1819) was a Hungarian monk and Burgenland Croatian writer.

Born in Devínska Nová Ves near Bratislava (originally Mátyás Knéfacz), died in Klingenbach. He wrote three books in Burgenland Croatian. Knéfacz, along with Lőrinc Bogovich, Jeremiás Sosterich and Godfried Palkovich played a role in the standardization of the Burgenland Croatian language in the 18th century.

== Works ==
- Lapat evangeliumszki (Evangeliary), 1798
- Marianszko czvéche (Virgin's flower), 1803
- Vrata nebészka (Heavenly Gate), 1804

== See also ==
- Burgenland Croats

== Literature ==
- Nikola Benčić: Književnost gradišćanskih Hrvata, Zagreb 1998. ISBN 953-6260-05-0
- Ludwig Kuzmich: Kulturhistorische Aspekte der burgenlandkroatischen Druckwerke bis 1921 mit einer primären Bibliographie, Eisenstadt 1992.
- Paul Jos. Šafařík's Geschichte der südslawischen Literatur, Verlag von Friedrich Tempsky 1864. (pdf file)
