= József Ficzkó =

Hungarian Roman Catholic priest and author

József Ficzkó or Fitzkó (Burgenland Croatian: Jožef Ficko) (15 March 1772 – 28 November 1843) was a Slovene Roman Catholic priest and writer. After becoming a priest in the village of Peresznye near the current Hungarian-Austrian border, he became one of the most important Burgenland Croatian writers of his time.

== Biography ==
Ficzkó was born in Boreča (now Prekmurje, Slovenia), then part of Hungary, which became part of the Austrian Empire in 1804. His parents were Miklós Ficzkó and Ilona (Jelena) Ficzkó. He studied in Szombathely with the help of Miklós Küzmics, a Prekmurje Slovene writer, and was ordained in 1797.

From 1802 until his death, Ficzkó was the priest in the small village of Peresznye, near Kőszeg, in an area in western Hungary in which many Burgenland Croats lived. Here he learned the local dialect of Croatian and wrote books in Burgenland Croatian. Ficzkó was a significant writer working in the standard language of the Burgenland Croats. His style was known as the Baroque.

Ficzkó rejected Panslavism, Illyrism, the new Serbo-Croatian language, and Gaj's alphabet. Instead, he supported using a clear Burgenland Croatian language to be understood by the people of his region.

== Works ==
- A.B.C. knyisicze za diczu Horváczkoga naroda va Kralyesztvi Vugerszkom (Primer for Croatian Children in the Kingdom of Hungary)
- Kratak pregléd Sztaroga Zakona (A Short Overview of the Old Testament), 1824
- Kratak pregléd Novoga Zakona (A Short Overview of the New Testament), 1824
- Nova hizsa zlata (The New Golden House), 1829
- Razlaganye velikoga katekismusa (An Explanation of the Great Catechism), 1836
- Kratko razlaganye czrikveni czeremoniov (Explanation of Church Ceremonies), 1836
- Novo Marianszko Zvetye (The New Virgin's Flower), 1837
- Nova Vrata nebeszka (The New Heavenly Gate), 1864

== Literature ==
- Nikola Benčić: Književnost gradišćanskih Hrvata, Zagreb 1998. ISBN 953-6260-05-0

== See also ==
- Catholic Church in Slovenia
