= Labour service in Hungary during World War II =

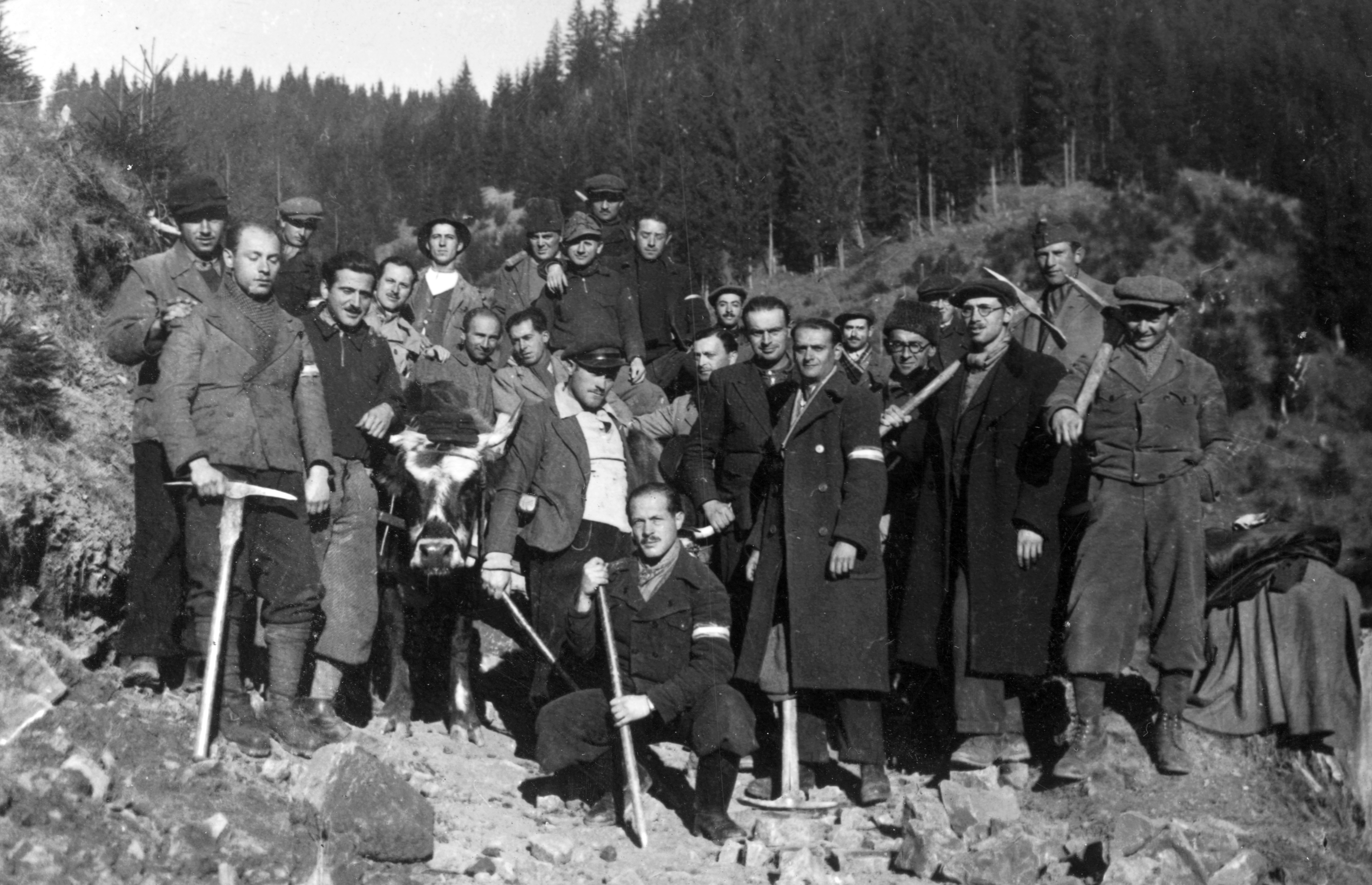
Hungarian labour service in Transylvania, Romania 1941

Labour service (Hungarian: munkaszolgálat) was required of "politically unreliable" and Hungarian-Jewish men in Hungary during the Holocaust and World War II after they were prohibited from serving in the regular armed forces by passage of the Hungarian anti-Jewish laws. In Hungary, Jews comprised over eight percent of the population, and the government imposed an alternative to military service. Labour service was forced labour, performed by labour battalions conscripted by the German-allied Hungarian regime primarily from Hungarian Jewish men during World War II. These units were an outgrowth of World War I units, when Jews served in the Hungarian armed forces along with Christians, as in Germany and other European countries. The commanders of these labour battalions often treated the Jewish units with extreme cruelty, abuse, and brutality. Men who worked in mine quarries were frequently pushed to their deaths off the man-made cliffs and embankments. These units were stationed all over Hungary, including 130,000 men at the Eastern Front in occupied Ukraine, where most of the men died. The gendarmes and Army men who guarded these "slaves" were mostly members of the antisemitic, fascist Arrow Cross Party.

== Origins ==
The labour service battalions were introduced in May 1939 by the Prime Minister Count Pál Teleki and right from the start Hungarian Jews who were conscripted were sent to the Labour Service battalions rather than the Honvéd (Royal Hungariarn Army) proper. The origins of the Labour Service battalions dated back to the troubled years of 1918–1919, which saw the Chrysanthemum Revolution of October 1918 that toppled the ancient House of Habsburg and the establishment of the Hungarian People's Republic led by the liberal Count Mihály Károlyi. Károlyi had scandalized his fellow aristocrats with his plans for land reform, and there was a widespread belief that Károlyi was an impractical idealist who had mismanaged the affairs of state. In turn, the Hungarian People's Republic was replaced by the Communist Hungarian Soviet Republic led by Béla Kun on 21 March 1919. Kun launched the Red Terror intended to transform Hungarian society, but the Hungarian Soviet Republic was overthrown after being defeated in a war with Romania in August 1919. In the aftermath of the war with Romania, the Kingdom of Hungary led by Admiral Miklós Horthy was established. The events of 1918–1919 were highly traumatic to the Magyar aristocracy, many of whom took part in or condoned the White Terror of 1919–1920 that saw Jews and Communists hunted down and killed by various right-wing paramilitary groups. No aristocrats were actually executed during the Red Terror as none chose to live under the Soviet Republic, but the nationalization of land owned by their nobility along with the seizure of their bank accounts, expensive jewelry, their mansions in Budapest and their castles in the countryside were all deeply traumatic to the nobility.

Much of the Magyar aristocracy took it for granted the Hungarian Soviet Republic was the work of the Jews, and there was a marked increase in antisemitism in Hungary after 1919. Estimates vary between 1,500 people killed in the White Terror to 5,000 killed, but at least third of the people killed were Hungarian Jews, most of whom had nothing to do with the Soviet Republic. Antisemitism was especially pronounced with the Magyar refugees from Transylvania and Upper Hungary (modern Slovakia) who settled in Hungary rather than live under Romanian and Czechoslovak rule and the lesser nobility (a class corresponded to the gentry) who often competed with the Hungarian Jewish middle class for jobs. As many of the lesser nobility served as Honvéd officers, antisemitism was very strong within the Honvéd. The aristocracy held over-sized importance within the Kingdom of Hungary as the open ballot along with laws that disfranchised poorer men from voting or holding office (Hungarian women regardless of income level were not allowed to vote or hold office until 1946) allowed the greater aristocracy and the lesser aristocracy to dominate politics. Due to the disfranchisement of most of the population and the fact that only upper-class men were allowed to vote, the political left was not a factor in Hungarian politics and the main divisions in politics were between a right-wing faction known as the conservatives vs. a more right-wing faction known as the radicals. Both the conservatives and the radicals favored antisemitic policies, but the conservatives tempered their antisemitism by arguing that Hungary needed its Jewish middle class to maintain the economy while the radicals did not. The so-called National Army that Horthy established in June 1919 to fight the Soviet Republic had a separate section for Jews who were assigned labour duties as Jews were not trusted to bear arms against the Soviet Republic, which was the inspiration for the Labour Service battalions established by the Teleki government in 1939.

== Operation Barbarossa ==
The badly fed and poorly clothed units were initially assigned to perform heavy construction work within Hungary. With Germany's invasion of the Soviet Union, Hungarian officials sent most of these units into Ukraine for additional forced labour work. They were subjected to atrocities, such as marching into mine fields to clear the area so that the regular troops could advance, and death by torture of prominent servicemen. Some units were entirely wiped out; in others, as few as 5% survived the war. However, these were exceptions. Generally speaking, member of the labour service units had more chance to survive the war than those of fighting units. Until 15 October 1944 the losses in the labour service units were: 41,340 person (27.5–34.4%). But 40%-of this loss had happened in one month: January 1943, in the Voronezh–Kharkov strategic offensive. The retreating Hungarian Second Army was destroyed; only 20% arrived back to Hungary, with the labour force units in much the same condition.

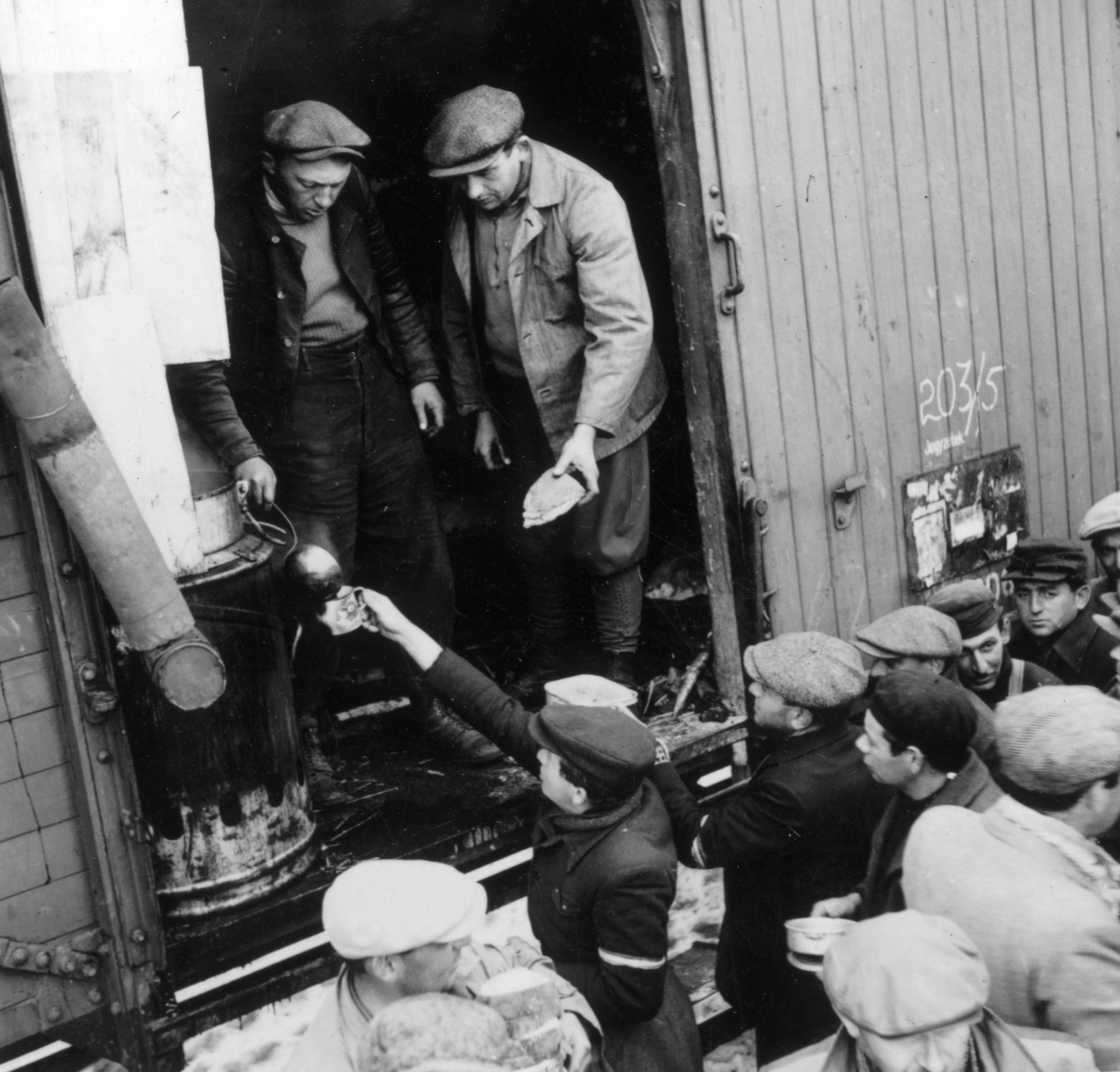
Distributing lunch for Hungarian forced labourers, 1941

A correspondence between the State Security Center and the Minister of Defense from 1942 (recovered in the Hungarian War Archive – Hadtörténelmi Levéltár) contributes to the still very scarce historical evidence that during World War II homosexuals were also targets of state control in Hungary. The correspondence contemplates whether or not to use homosexuals as forced labour within the wartime Labour Service System and has attached a list of altogether 993 alleged homosexuals. The phrase ‘officially registered homosexuals’ is used in the correspondence, supporting the supposition that the list was based on police registry.

The famous poet Miklós Radnóti and writer Antal Szerb died during labour service. Ordinary people, such as Miklos Farkas, born in Turcz in 1909, in the Northern Transylvanian county of Szatmár, were among the few survivors of their units. His unit was last based in Siegendorf, Austria, having previously been detailed to a stone quarry for most of the war. At Siegendorf, as the war came to an end, the guns of the advancing Soviet forces could be heard by the Nyilas (Hungarian Arrow Cross troops who guarded the Jewish slaves). They decided to march most of the men out of the camp.

Suspecting an attempt to murder the prisoners before the Soviets could liberate them, Farkas and a few other men scattered underneath the barracks as they heard their friends being marched away. A short time later, they heard volleys of gunshots not too far away. Several hours later, in the night, they emerged from hiding and moved eastward towards the Hungarian-Austrian border where they met Soviet forces. Most of the young Jewish men had typhus and had to be hospitalized for several weeks until they recovered, then took one-way train trips home. Miklos went home most of the way as a stowaway on top of a train car to the small city of Halmin, now called Halmeu, in northern Romania.

Of the 40, 000 Hungarian Jewish men drafted into the Labour Service battalions between 1940–1942, only 5, 000 survived by 1943 with the rest being killed by the Germans or by their fellow Hungarians. The most common form of death in the Labour Service battalions was death via starvation as feeding the men serving in the battalions was not considered important in the Honvéd. Given the conditions in the Labour Service battalions, both the desertion rate the surrender rate was very high. Most of the men serving in the Labour Service battalions felt that they had a better chance of survival in Soviet captivity than they did in the Labour Service and as such the labour service men surrendered to the Red Army whenever possible. Though not intended as such, the Labour Service effectively broke any possibility of Jewish resistance after Operation Margarethe, the German occupation of Hungary in March 1944, which brought the "Final Solution to the Jewish Question" to Hungary. Most of the young men who might had formed the core of Jewish resistance groups such was the case in Poland and the Soviet Union had been already killed, deserted or surrendered by the time of Operation Margarethe.
