= VND (disambiguation) =

VND is the ISO 4217 code for Vietnamese đồng, the currency of Vietnam.

VND may also refer to:

- Variable neighborhood descent, an extension of Variable Neighborhood Search
- Vendor tree prefix (vnd.), an internet media type definition
- Ventral nervous system defective (vnd), a gene in Drosophila fruit flies
- Virulent Newcastle disease

== See also ==
- UND (disambiguation)
