= Peresznye =

Peresznye Prisika
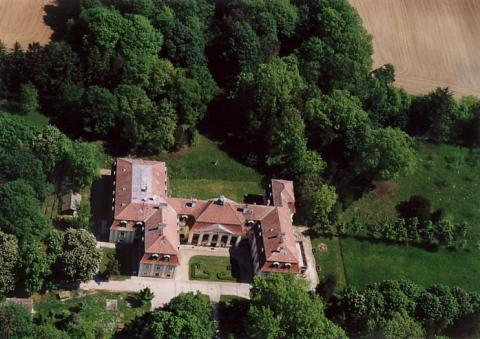
- Széchenyi family castle

- Flag Coat of arms

- Location of Peresznye
- Coordinates: 47.42378°N 16.65092°E
- Country: Hungary
- County: Vas

Area
  - Total: 10.73 km^{2} (4.14 sq mi)

Population (2004)
  - Total: 699
  - Density: 65.14/km^{2} (168.7/sq mi)
- Time zone: UTC+1 (CET)
  - Summer (DST): UTC+2 (CEST)
- Postal code: 9734
- Area code: 94
- Website: http://www.peresznye.hu/

Peresznye (Croatian: Prisika; German: Prössing) is a village in Vas County, Hungary, close to the border towards Austria which was drawn in 1921 according to the Treaty of Trianon. It is situated between Lutzmannsburg, Burgenland, Austria, and Csepreg, Hungary, appr. 10 km eastwards of the border town Kőszeg, and inhabited partly by Burgenland Croats.

Here the priest and writer József Ficzkó, publishing in the version of Croatian today called Burgenland Croatian, lived and worked in the 19th century. Ficzkó was praised for having contributed extraordinarily to the development of self-esteem and identity of the Burgenland Croats by using their language (which was not his mothertongue, as he was of Slovene origin) in writing.

The palace of Peresznye after World War I was the last residence of the former Austro-Hungarian foreign minister (until 1915) and supreme court master (Obersthofmeister) of the last emperor, Charles I., Count Leopold Berchtold, who owned the place and died here in 1942.
