= Jenő Takács =

Hungarian composer and pianist

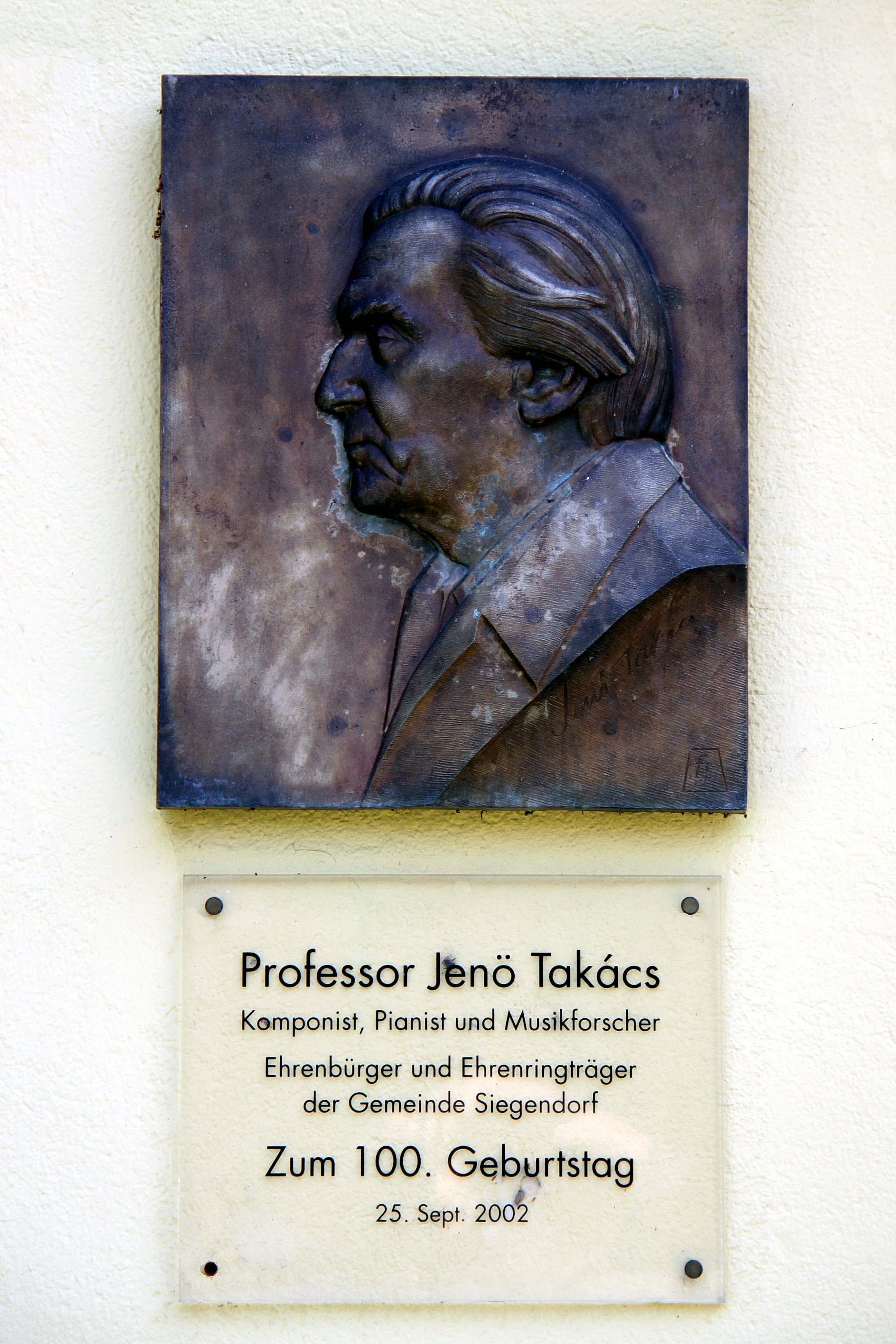
Jenő Takács-memorial in Siegendorf.

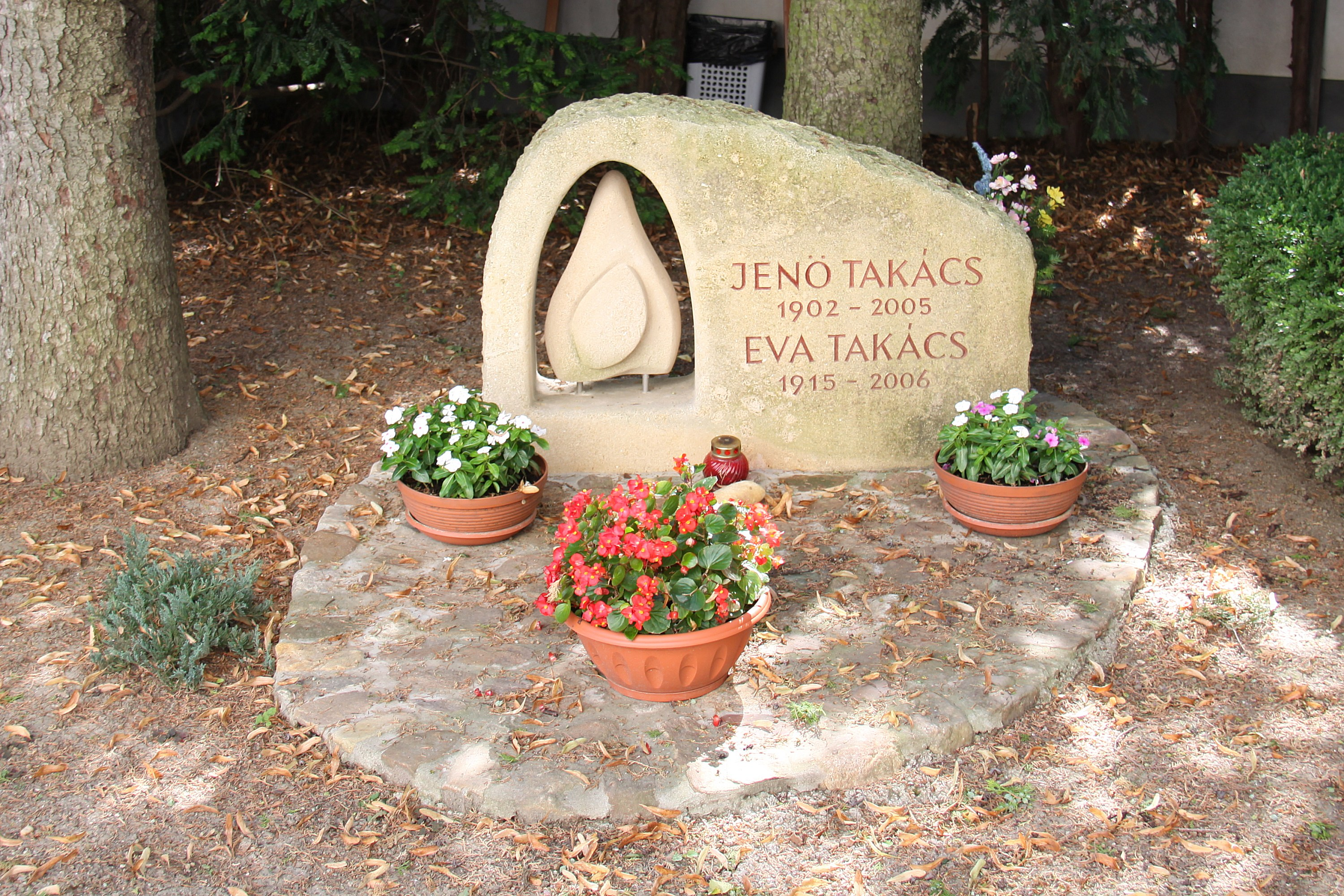
Jenő Takács-grave in Siegendorf.

Jenő Takács (Hungarian pronunciation: [ˈjɛnøː ˈtɒkaːt͡ʃ]; 25 September 1902 – 14 November 2005) was a Hungarian composer and pianist.

== Life and work ==
Born in Cinfalva on 25 September 1902, he studied at the Academy of Music and Performing Arts in Vienna with Joseph Marx in composition and Paul Weingarten in piano until 1926 at the University of Vienna counterpoint with Hans Gál and musicology with Guido Adler. Since 1920, he had already undertaken tours through Germany, Hungary and Yugoslavia.

In 1926 he made acquaintance with Béla Bartók; from which a lively contact arose until Bartók's emigration to the United States in 1940. He was a professor of piano at the conservatory of Cairo, Egypt from 1927 to 1932, where he made Arab and Egyptian Music the subject of his research. He knew Egon Wellesz, Curt Sachs, Erich Moritz von Hornbostel and Paul Hindemith.

In the years 1932 to 1934 he was a professor of piano and composition at the University of the Philippines, Conservatory of Music. He gave concerts in Japan, China and Hong Kong. Due to a new professorship in piano at the conservatory in Cairo in 1938, he made his first trip to the United States. In 1939, he moved to Sopron in Hungary, however the German authorities made his life difficult. In the years 1942 to 1948, he was director of the Conservatory in Pécs, Hungary. In 1943, he married Eva Pasteiner.

At that time, he learned from Zoltán Kodály, Ernö Dohnányi, Sándor Weöres, Darius Milhaud and Yehudi Menuhin. From 1948-49, he left then the communist-ruled Hungary and settled down in Grundlsee after stays in Austria, Switzerland and Italy. In the years 1949 to 1952, he conducted concert tours in Europe and America and was visiting professor at the conservatories of Geneva and Lausanne. In addition, he was professor of piano and composition at the Cincinnati Conservatory of Music. In 1970, after his retirement in Cincinnati, he moved back to Siegendorf, where he remained until his death. On the occasion of his 100th birthday his works were performed in about 200 concerts. He died in Eisenstadt in 2005 at the age of 103.

== Awards ==
- 1953 Title of Professor
- 1962 Grand Decoration of Burgenland; honorary citizen of Siegsdorf
- 1963 State Prize for Music
- 1970 Fellow of the Graduate School of the University of Cincinnati
- 1976 National Cultural Award in Burgenland
- 1981 Bartók medal
- 1983 Kodály Medal
- 1987 Honorary Member of the Austrian composer and the Federal University of Music in Graz
- 1990 Prize of Bartók Pászthory Foundation Budapest
- 1992 Prize for Music of the Federal Ministry of Education and Arts
- 1993 Honorary Medal of the Austrian capital Vienna in gold; Haydn Medal of Eisenstadt; Cross of Merit of the Hungarian Republic
- 1997 Commander's Cross of Burgenland
- 2001 Austrian Cross of Honour for Science and Art, 1st class
- 2002 Gold Medal of the Findings University of Music and Performing Arts, Vienna
- 2004 Honorary Ring of the Liszt Ferenc Academy of Music in Budapest; Würdigungspreis Central Cross with Star of the Republic of Hungary, honorary member of Kibu (composers and performers in Burgenland)

== List of works ==
(incomplete, taken from the German page)

=== Piano or solo piano works ===
- Spanische Eseltreiber Spanish Donkey Driver
- Humoreske für Klavier op. 1 (1918/28) siehe Werkliste Doblinger
- Sonatine für Klavier op. 2 (1920/23) siehe Werkliste Doblinger
- Sonate für Violine und Klavier op. 6 (1922) siehe Werkliste Doblinger
- Drei Bagatellen "Rhapsodietta" für Klavier op. 10 (datiert 1927)
- Suite Arabe op. 15 für zwei Klaviere (1929)
- Philippine Island Miniatures op. 34 (1936)
- Von fremden Ländern und Menschen 20 Stücke für Klavier op. 37
- Konzert für Klavier und Orchester op. 38 (1933/34)
- Napolitana, Tanzszenen für Klavier op. 46 (1942)
- Kleine Sonate für Klavier op. 51 (1943/44)
- Toccata für Klavier op. 54 (1945)
- Toccata und Fuge op. 56 für Klavier für linke Hand
- Knusperhäuschen. Tanzszene für Klavier zu vier Händen und Schlagzeug ad lib. op. 56 (1952)
- Partita für Klavier op. 58 (1954)
- Allerlei für kleine Finger op. 63 (?) 24 leichte Stücke für Klavier
- Für mich/ For me. Kleine Vortragsstücke für Klavier op. 76 (1963)
- Sons et Silences für Klavier op. 78 (1963/64)
- Wenn der Frosch auf Reisen geht, 6 Stücke für Klavier ohne-opus Zahl (1971)
- Klänge und Farben / Sounds and Colours für Klavier op. 95 (1973/74)
- Le Tombeau de Franz Liszt für Klavier op. 100 (1975)
- 4X4 Klavierstücke zu 4 Händen op. 106 (1979/80)
- Von Nah und Fern, 21 leichte Stücke für Klavier op. 111 (1983)
- Neues für Dich für Klavier op. 116 (?)
- Konzertetüde (Toccata Nr. 2) für Klavier op. 120 (1988)
- Drei Minuten für Klavier op. 123 (1997)

==== Musica Biologica ====
- Dialoge nach Vogelstimmen für Flöte solo ohne opus-Zahl (1981/82)
- Musica Biologica "Vogelstimmen in der Klaviermusik" bearb. für Klavier (1986)

=== Chamber music works ===
- Trio-Rhapsodie für Violine, Violoncello und Klavier op.11 (datiert 1926)
- Goumbrie für Violine und Klavier op. 20 (1931)
- Kleine Musik für 2 Sopran- und Tenorblockflöte op. 30 (?)
- Rhapsodie (ungarische Weisen) für Violine und Klavier op. 49 (1941)
- Acht kleine Stücke für Violine und Klavier op. 50 (1949/50)
- Sonata für Posaune oder Bariton und Klavier op. 59 (1946/47)
- Divertimento für Flöte oder Violine und Gitarre op. 61 (1954)
- Meditation und Reigen für Gitarre op. 64 (1955/80)
- Sonata Concertante für Violine und Klavier op. 65 (1956)
- Sonata Missoulana für Oboe oder Fagott und Klavier op. 66 (1958)
- Meditation und Reigen für Oboe oder Fagott, Streichorchester und Harfe ad lib. op. 66a (1958)
- Sonata breve für Trompete und Klavier op. 67 (1958)
- Eine kleine Tafelmusik. Divertimento für Bläserquintett op. 74 (1961/1962)
- Dialoge für Violine und Gitarre op. 77 (1963)
- Sonata Capricciosa für Tuba und Klavier op. 81 (1965)
- Essays in Sound für Klarinette und Klavier op. 84 (1967)
- The Songs of Silence, Ballett in einem Bild für Klarinette, Klavier und Schlagwerk op. 85 (1967)
- Homage to Pan. Zwei Stücke für 4 Klarinetten in B op. 87 (1968)
- Two Fantastics für Alt-Saxophon und Klavier op. 88 (1969)
- Fantastic I für Klarinette in A und Klavier (aus: Two Fantastics) op. 88a (1969–1974)
- Späte Gedanken für Violine und Gitarre op. 90 (1969)
- Musica Reservata für Kontrabass und Klavier op. 91 (1969)
- Serenade nach Altgrazer Kontratänzen für Bläserquintett op. 83a (1973)
- Tagebuch-Fragmente für zwei Klaviere und Schlagwerk op. 93 (1972)
- Monolog für Violoncello op. 94 (1973/74)
- Oktett op. 96 (1974/75)
- Klarinetten-Studio. Zwölf Stücke für Klarinette in B und Klavier op. 97 (1976)
- Trompeten-Studio I. 16 Stücke für 2-3 Trompeten in C od. B op. 98 (1976/77)
- Trompeten-Studio II. Zwölf Stücke für Trompete und Klavier op. 99 (1975/76)
- Fünf Bagatellen für zehn Bläser op. 102 (1977)
- Tiberika, 8 Duos für 2 Violinen op. 103 (1977)
- Quodlibet für Kontrafagott oder Fagott und Klavier op. 104 (1978)
- Ganz leichte (und nicht so leichte) Stücke für sopran- oder Altblockflöte (Querflöte) und Gitarre op. 105 (1979)
- Variationen über ein Thema von Paisiello für Flöte und Violine op. 107 (1980)
- Changing Moods / Wechselnde Launen für Flöte, Posaune (Fagott) und Klavier op. 110 (1982/83)
- Drifting Leaves (Verwehte Blätter) für Flöte, Viola, und Gitarre op. 113 (1983)
- Musik für sechs Bläser und Klavier op. 114 (1984)
- Altungarische Hofballmusik für Kontrabass und Klavier op. 115 (1984/85)
- Frühlingsmusik für Flöte (Altblockflöte), Violoncello und Gitarre ohne opus-Zahl (1985)
- Hommage á Henry Purcell für Blechbläserquintett ohne opus-Zahl (1994)
- Vier Konzertstücke für Violine und Klavier ohne opus-Zahl

=== Orchestral works ===
- Suite Philippine für Kammerorchester op. 35 (1935)
- Von fremden Ländern und Menschen op. 37, Suite für Orch. bearb.
- Tarantella für Klavier und Orchester op. 39 (1937)
- Nilusi Legenda (Ägyptische Liebeslegende), Ballett (1938/39)
- Suite altungarischer Tänze für Streicher op. 42 (datiert 1946) das am häufigsten aufgeführte Werk -sein, unser- OPUS MAGNUM
- ANTIQUA HUNGARICA op. 47 (1941)
- Ländliches Barock (Soproni barokk Muzsika), eine Orchestersuite nach einem altungarischen Notenheft op. 48 (1941)
- Rhapsodie (Ungarische Weisen) für Violine und Streichorchester op. 49a (1941)
- Miniatures für Orchester op. 53 (1943/44)
- Partita für Gitarre oder Cembalo und Orchester op. 55 (1949/50)
- Volkstänze aus dem Burgenland für Orchester op. 57 (1952)
- Concerto für Klavier, Streichorchester und Schlagwerk op. 60 (1947)
- Overtura semiseria op. 69 für Orchester (?)
- Passacaglia für Streichorchester op. 73 (1960)
- Eisenstädter Divertimento, Orchestersuite op. 75 (1961/62)
- SERENADE nach Altgrazer Kontratänzen für Orchester op. 83 (1966) arr. auch für Blasorchester, Bläserquintett und vier Klaviere
- Sinfonia breve für Orchester op. 108 (1981)
- Postkartengrüße, 7 Stück für Streichorchester ohne-opus Zahl (1987)
- Pannonische Rhapsodie für großes Orchester op. 109 (1988)
- Suite Purcelliana für Streicher ohne-opus Zahl (?)
- American Rhapsody. Vier Stücke - vier Länder. Vier leichte Stücke für Streichquartett(-orchester) ohne opus-Zahl (1993)
- Jennersdorfer Musik. Acht leichte Stücke für Streich- (Jugend-)orchester ohne-opus Zahl (1993)

=== Symphonic works ===
- Deux mouvements Symphoniques pour Thérémine et Orchestre op. 41 (1938)
- Suite altungarischer Tänze für Streicher op. 42 arr. von Armin Suppan für Blasorchester(-symphonie) (1988)
- Pannonische Rhapsodie für großes Blasorchester arr. von Armin Suppan op. 109 (1988)

=== Vocal music ===
- Fünf Kroatische Bauernlieder aus dem Burgenland für mittlere Stimme und Klavier op. 36 (1934)
- Five Fragments of Jade op. 40
- Hirtenlied aus dem Burgenland / Christmas Song from Austria für gemischten Chor a capella ohne-opus Zahl (1965)
- Essays on the Madrigal op. 70
- Der Sommer zerfiel, Sechs Lieder für mittlere Stimme op. 101 (1977)
- Hymnus für Chor a cappella (1978)
- Miss Sona-Tina nach Kinderliedern für Klavier op. 118 (1985)
- Der Kahnfahrer im Mond, eine Bühnenmusik (1944–1985)
- Szelid Domb (Sanfter Hügel), Chöre op. 117 (1985)

=== Church choir, organ and orchestra works ===
- Aus einem altungarischen Notenbüchel (Bearb. für Orgel) (1941)
- Das Lied von der Schöpfung. Kantate für gemischten Chor und Orchester nach einem Gedicht von Sándor Weöres op. 44 (1943/44)
- Toccata Mistica für vierstimmigen Chor und Orgel op. 86 (1968)
- Sechs Metamorphosen für Orgel op. 121 (1989)
