= UND =

UND or Und may refer to:

- Und, Hungary, a village
- Und, a 1999 play by Howard Barker
- University of North Dakota, a public university in Grand Forks, North Dakota
- University of Notre Dame, a Catholic university in South Bend, Indiana
- Undetermined language, in ISO 639-3 language codes
- And in several languages related to German

== See also ==
- VND (disambiguation)
