= Boreča =

Boreča Borháza
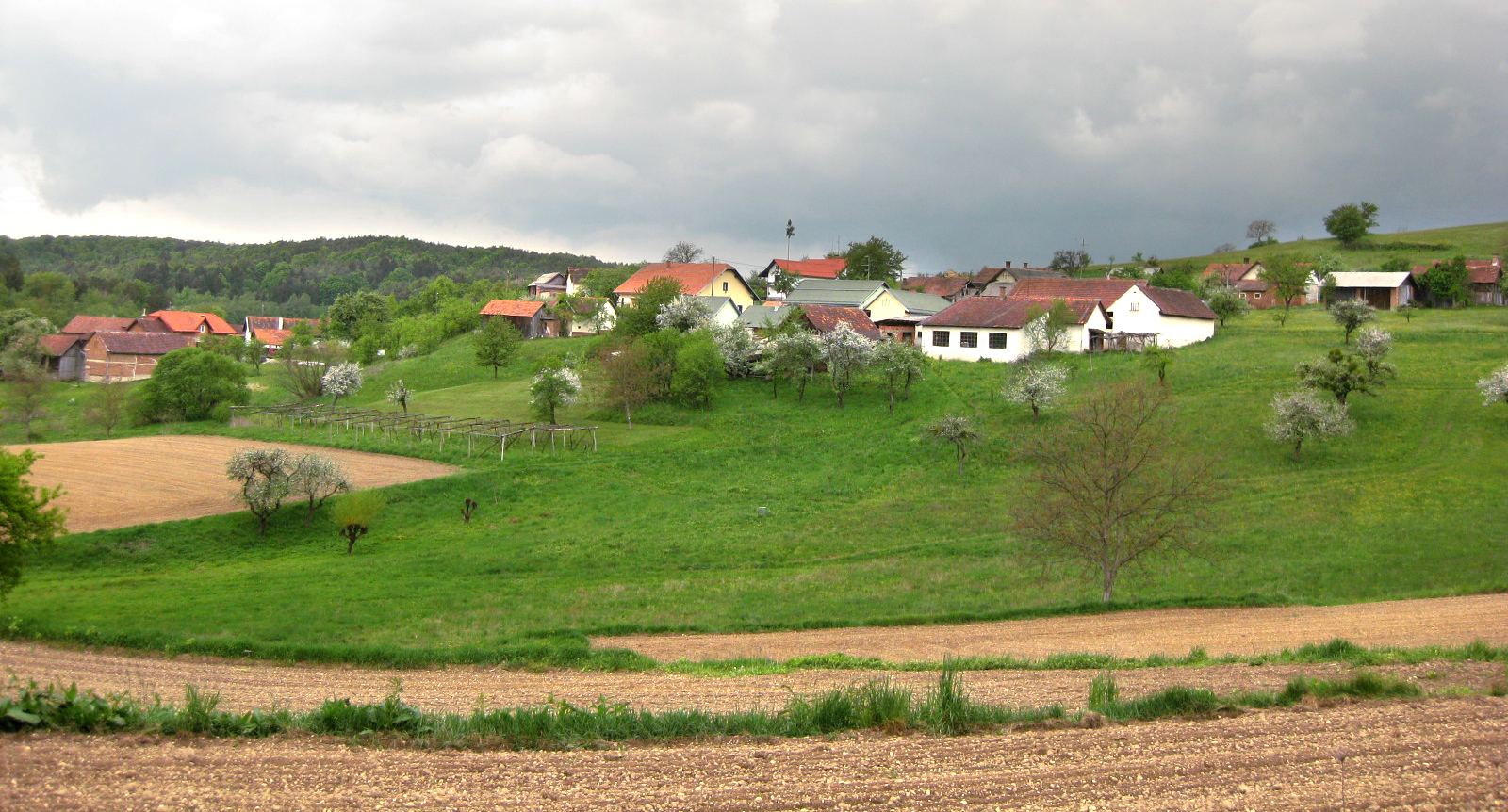

- Location in Slovenia
- Coordinates: 46°50′5.53″N 16°8′33.49″E
- Country: Slovenia
- Traditional region: Prekmurje
- Statistical region: Mura
- Municipality: Gornji Petrovci

Area
  - Total: 3.49 km^{2} (1.35 sq mi)
- Elevation: 336.3 m (1,103 ft)

Population (2020)
  - Total: 84
  - Density: 24/km^{2} (62/sq mi)

Boreča (pronounced [bɔˈɾeːtʃa]; Hungarian: Borháza) is a village in the Municipality of Gornji Petrovci in the Prekmurje region of Slovenia. Unlike the surrounding area, the village is relatively nucleated and surrounded by a pine forest. The local church is built southeast of the village and is a Late Gothic building dating to 1521. It has a relatively high nave with a narrower polygonal sanctuary. In 1739 its interior was refurbished in the Baroque style. It is dedicated to Saint Anne and belongs to the Murska Sobota Diocese. There is a Catholic cemetery next to the church. The Lutheran cemetery lies beyond it. There is also a wooden Lutheran belfry in the village.

== Notable people ==
Notable people that were born or lived in Boreča include:

- József Ficzkó (a.k.a. Jožef Ficko) (1772–1843), Burgenland Croatian writer
