= Rauhriegel =

Cadastral Community in Austria

Rauhriegel Rauhriegel, Füsthegy, Rorigljin
- Village
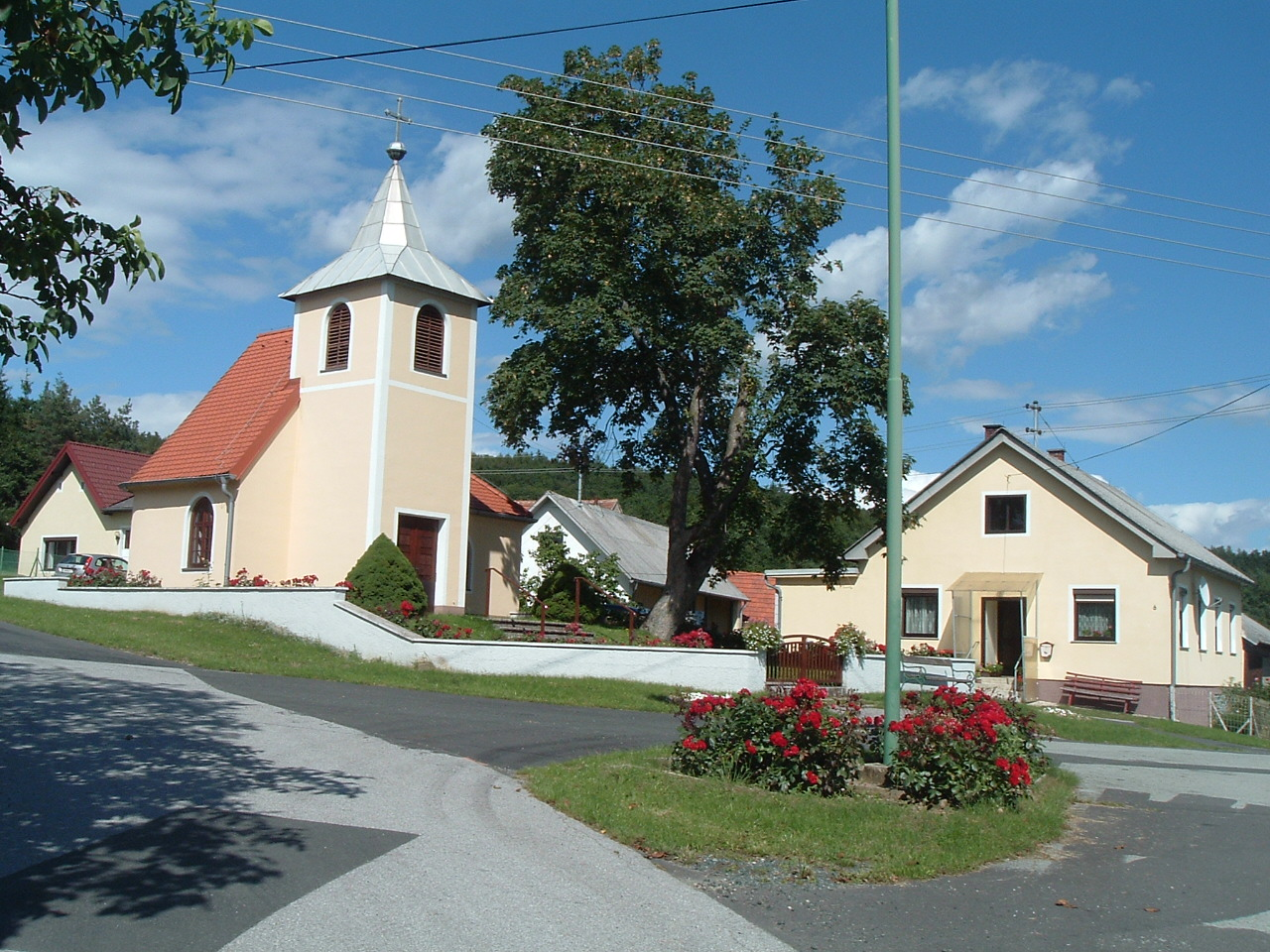
- Panorama of Rauhriegel

- Location within Austria
- Coordinates: 47°19′45″N 16°18′0″E
- Country: Austria
- State: Burgenland
- Municipality: Weiden bei Rechnitz
- First settled: 1570

Population (January 1st 2023)
  - Total: 21
- Postal Code: 7463

Rauhriegel, Hungarian: Füsthegy; Croatian: Roriglyin; is a small village and cadastral community located within the municipality of Weiden bei Rechnitz in Oberwart district, which is located in the Austrian state of Burgenland.

== History ==
Its first inhabitants were border guards belonging to the castle of Salonika, who settled in the area in the 16th century. Later, they were replaced by Croatians. Over the centuries, it was sometimes mentioned together with the neighboring village of Sirokány, sometimes separately. In 1910, along with neighboring Sirokany, it had 181, predominantly Croatian residents. The two villages shared the name of Füsthegy-sirokány. Until the 1920 Treaty of Trianon, it belonged to the Kingdom of Hungary within the district of Kőszegi, in the royal county of Vas. In 1921, it became part of the Austrian state of Burgenland. Due to the Anschluss of Austria before World War II. it was administered by Nazi Germany from 1938-1945. After World War II, the region was controlled by the Soviet Union during the Allied-occupation of Austria from 1945-1955. In 1971, it was administratively attached to Weiden bei Rechnitz.

== Development ==
At the turn of the year 1979/1980 there were a total of 14 building areas with 7,216 m² and 18 gardens on 27,419 m² in the Rauhriegel cadastral community; in 1989/1990 there were 14 building areas. In 1999/2000 the number of building areas had increased to 49 and in 2009/2010 there were 34 buildings on 66 building areas.

== Land usage ==
The cadastral community is agricultural. At the turn of the year 1979/1980, 50 hectares were used for agricultural purposes and 33 hectares were managed forest areas. In 1999/2000, agriculture was practiced on 39 hectares and 47 hectares were designated as forestry areas. At the end of 2018, 36 hectares were used as agricultural land and forestry was practiced on 47 hectares. The average soil climate number of Rauhriegel is 34.7 (as of 2010).

== Sightseeing ==
In the center of town, there lies a small Roman catholic church

== Sources ==
- Südburgenland - Rauhriegel. (n.d.). https://www.sued-burgenland.com/rauhriegel.htm
- Ortsverzeichnis 2001 Burgenland (PDF; 3,5 MB), Statistik Austria, Wien 2004, S. 107. ISBN 3-902452-40-4
- BEV: Regionalinformation 31.12.2018 auf bev.gv.at (online)
- András Vályi : Description of the Hungarian Country I–III Buda: Royal University. 1796–1799
- Fényes Elek : Geographical dictionary of Hungary, in which every city, village and wasteland is meticulously described. Pest: Fényes Elek. 1851.
- Counties and cities of Hungary : Monograph of Hungary - An encyclopedia of the history, geography, fine arts, ethnography, military and natural conditions, cultural and economic conditions of the countries of the Hungarian crown. Ed. Samu Borovszky – János Sziklay . Budapest: National Monograph Society. 1896–1914. → electronic contact Vas county
