= Burgenland Croats =

Ethnic group in Austria

Position of Burgenland on the map of Austria

Burgenland Croats (Croatian: Gradišćanski Hrvati, German: Burgenlandkroaten, Hungarian: Burgenlandi horvátok, Slovak: Hradskí Chorváti) are ethnic Croats in the Austrian state of Burgenland, along with Croats in neighboring Hungary and Slovakia.

Around 320,000 residents of Austria identify as of Croat heritage; 56,785 have, as sole or multiple nationality, Croatian citizenship as at 2017. Between 87,000 and 130,000 of them are Burgenland Croats.

Since 1993, Croatian organizations have appointed their representatives to the Council for National Minorities of the Austrian government.

== History ==
The ancestors of the Burgenland Croats began to emigrate from Lika, Krbava, Kordun, Banovina, Moslavina and Western Bosnia. These areas were occupied by the Ottomans during the Turkish wars (1533–1584). The refugee Croats were given land and independent ecclesiastical rights by the Austrian King Ferdinand I, because many of their villages had been pillaged by the Turks. This gave the Croats a safe place to live while providing Austria with a buffer zone between Vienna and the Ottoman Empire to the south and east.

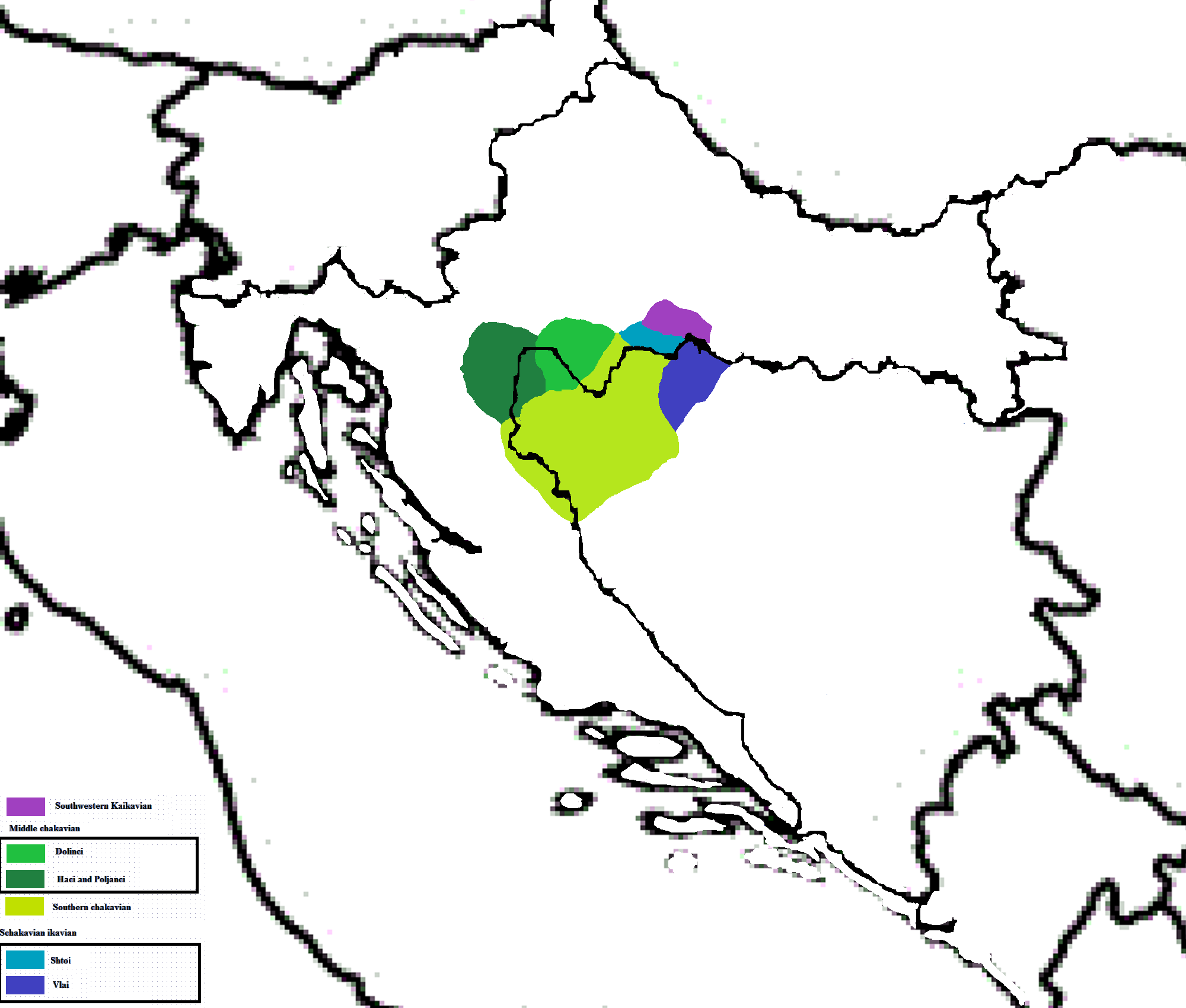
Theory of origin of Burgenland Croats in Bosnia-Herzegovina and Croatia.

The first wave of emigration came in the 1530s, after the Turks destroyed almost all the settlements between the river Una and the mountain Velebit, along with the land between the river Kupa and the mountain range Kapela. The second wave came in the 1540s whereby many Croats left Slavonia. The third and last wave of emigration came in the 1750s and 1760s.

Specifically from Dalmatia, Croatia a smaller group went across the Adriatic Sea to the Molise region of Italy, the Molise Croats.

The Burgenland Croats developed their own orthography during the Counter-Reformation, however, assimilation soon followed with the language being banned from use in churches and schools.

After falling under Hungarian rule in the Dual Monarchy, liberal laws regarding ethnicity enabled them to rekindle their language and heritage. However, when a 1900 census revealed that only 18.8% of the population of Burgenland spoke Hungarian, severe policies of Magyarization were implemented, revoking many individual and community rights. The Burgenland Croats were also persecuted by Austro-German nationalists after World War I, and by the Nazis during World War II. During this time, they tried to assimilate the Burgenland Croats.

The Croats gained minority status in the Austrian Treaty of Independence of 1955. Since then, they and their culture have undergone something of a renaissance, with the language being taught at schools and spoken in Church, wherever there is a large enough minority.

== Language ==
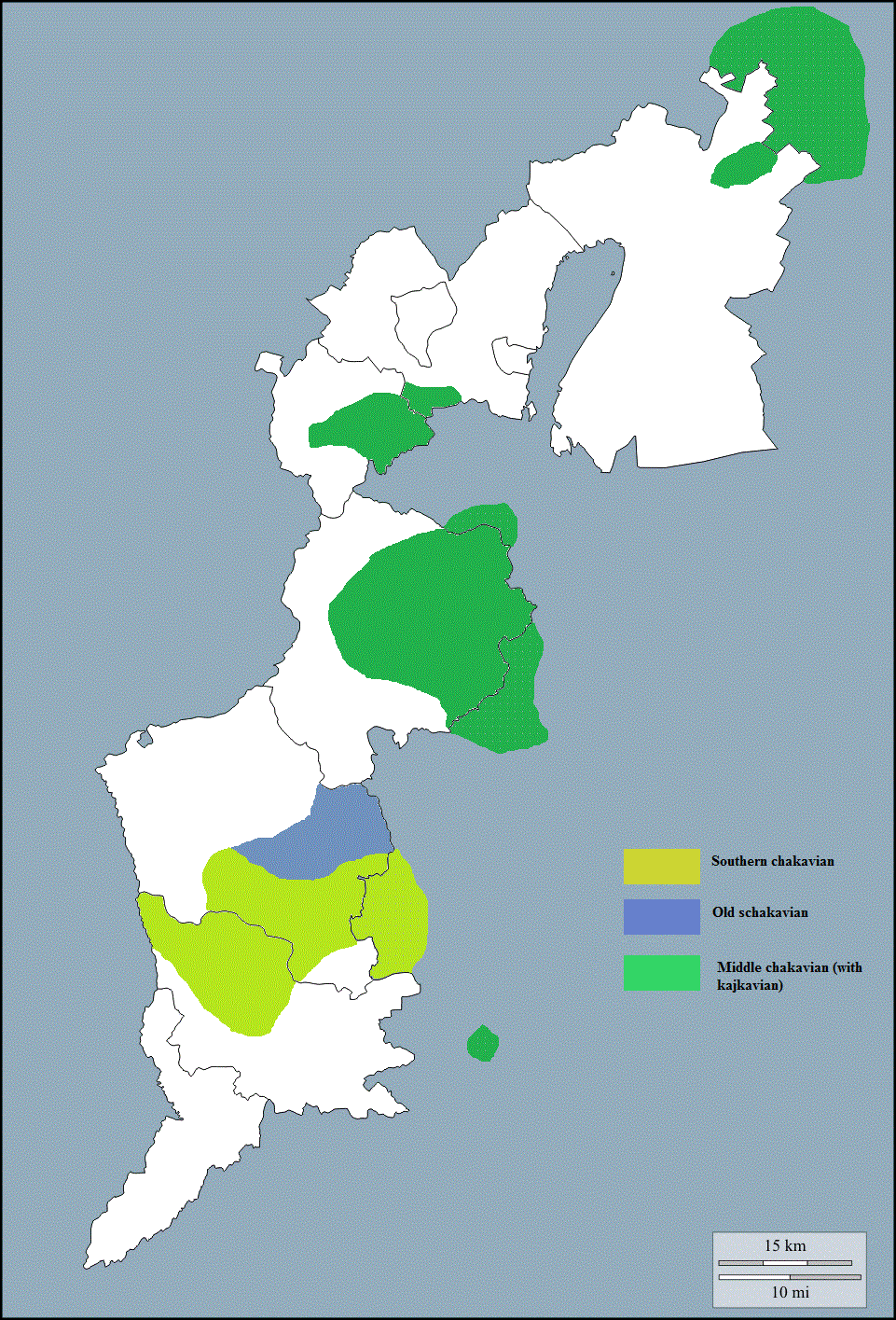
Dialects of Burgenland Croats by J. Lisac

Despite the presence of many languages in the surrounding region, the Burgenland Croats preserved their Croatian language and its dialects of the Croatian regions from which they originated. Burgenland Croatian, as well as the general Croatian standard language, combines the Chakavian, Shtokavian and Kajkavian dialect. But unlike the Croatian standard language, which is mostly based on the most widespread Shtokavian dialect, the Burgenland variant of Croatian is based on the Chakavian dialect. Burgenland Croatian includes phrases no longer used in standard Croatian, as well as certain phrases and words taken from German and Hungarian. Names are often written according to Hungarian orthography, due to the Magyarisation policies during the late 19th and early 20th centuries. Almost all Burgenland Croats are fluent in German.

After the dissolution of the Austro-Hungarian monarchy in 1918, the area in which the Burgenland Croats lived was divided between Austria, Czechoslovakia and Hungary. After 1921, most of these areas became part of Austria, which established a new province of Burgenland, which later gave the Burgenland identifier to these Croats. In 1922, Austria founded the Apostolic administration of Burgenland, and began to abolish bilingual schools, by introducing the German language to all primary schools. This process was temporarily stopped after the adoption of The National Education Act, which allowed for Croatian-language elementary schools. After Hitler annexed Austria in 1938, this law was abolished. In 1955, the Austrian State Treaty was signed. It gave permission to the Burgenland Croats to use Croatian in education, judiciary, and public administration. With the adoption of the Law on National Minorities in 1976, use of Croatian in public life became limited. After a constitutional complaint was heeded in 1987, parts of the law were changed and Croatian was introduced as an official language in 6 out of 7 districts of Burgenland.

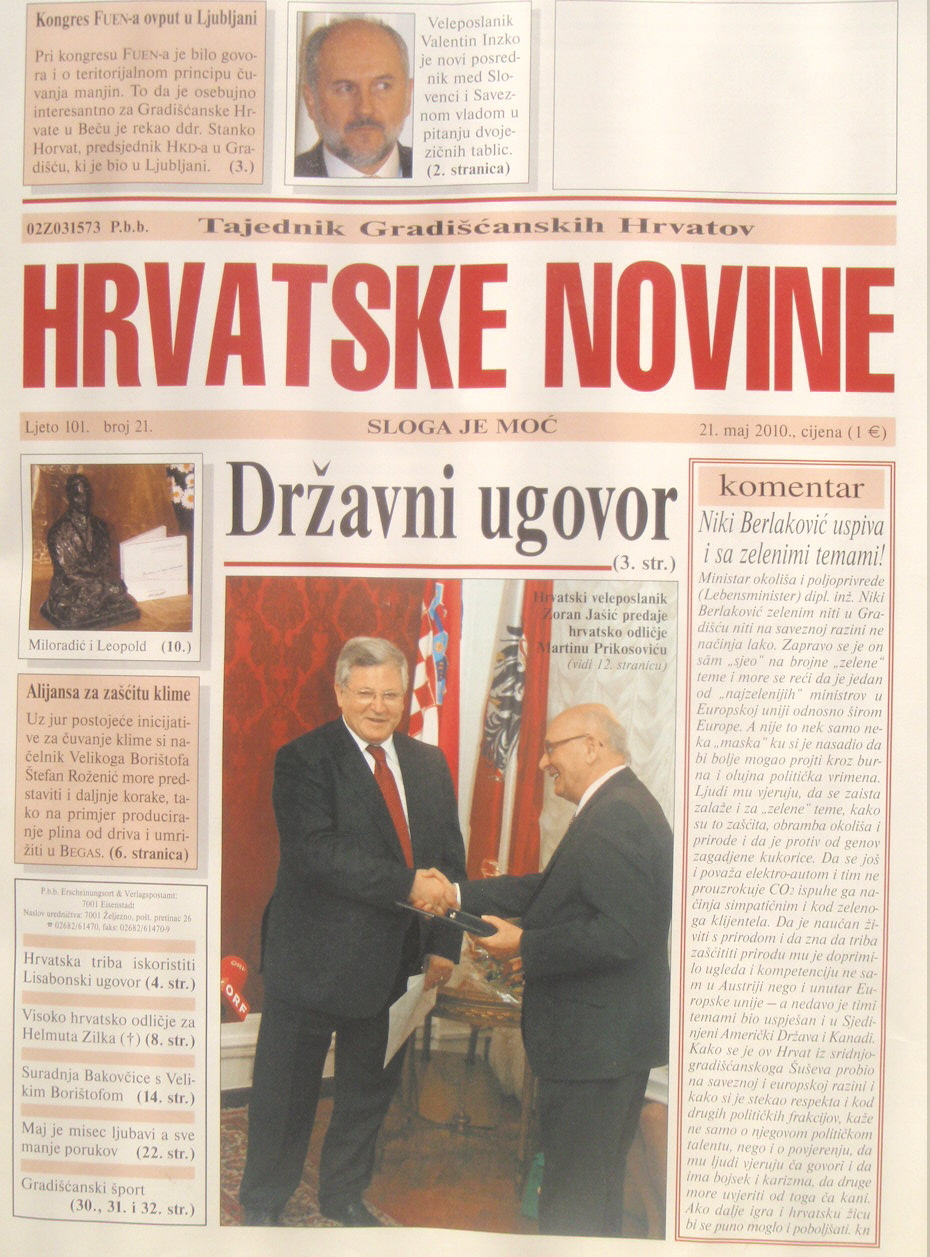
Weekly newspapers Hrvatske novine published in Burgenland

Newspapers of the Burgenland Croats are: Crikveni glasnik (Church Gazett), 1946; Naše selo (Our village), 1947; Naš tjednik (Our weekly), 1947; Naša domovina (Our homeland), 1952; Glas (Voice), 1957; Novi glas (New Voice), 1969; Put (Way), 1981).

The beginnings of literacy are linked to: Klimpuški misal (Klimpuški Missal) (1501), S. Consul Histrianus and Anton Dalmatin's Postila (Postil) (1568), Duševne pesne (Spiritual songs) (1609), and Grgur Mekinić Pythiraeus's Druge knjige duševnih pesan (Other books of the Spiritual songs) (1611). By the mid-19th century, Burgenland Croatian literature had a predominantly religious character and was intended mostly for peasants. The main writers were priests and nuns. In the second half of the 19th century, teachers begin to write, thanks to that many school textbooks and calendars were written.

The most popular Burgeland Croat writers are: J. Mulih (1694–1754), Godefrid Palković (1714–78), L. Bogović (1719–89), E. M. Kragel (1725–88), M. Laáb (cca. 1746–1823), J. Ficko (1772–1843), M. Drobilić (1808–91), T. Jordan (1815–93), G. Glavanić (1833–72), M. Naković (1840–1900), I. Mušković (1848–1930), M. Borenić (1850–1939), Ivan Čuković (1865–1944), P. Jandrišević (1879–1938), I. Blažević (1888–1946), Mate Meršić Miloradić (1850–1928), Ignac Horvat (1895–1973), Martin Meršić, A. Blazović (1921–2004), Franz Probst (1919–93), N. Benčić (b. 1938), Ivan (Lav) Sučić (b. 1938), Mathilda Bölcs (b. 1949), J. Čenar (b. 1956), P. Tyran (b. 1955) and H. Gassner (b. 1955).

The first book about the history of Burgenland literature, Naši pisci i književnost (Our writers and literature), was written by F. Sedenik in 1912.

== Organisations ==
- Hrvatsko kulturno društvo u Gradišću (Croatian Culture Association in Burgenland), 1929
- Hrvatsko gradišćansko kulturno društvo u Beču (Burgenland Croatian Culture Association in Vienna), 1934
- Hrvatsko nakladno društvo (Croatian Publishers Association), 1947-since 1960 Hrvatsko štamparsko društvo (Croatian Press Association)
- Hrvatski akademski klub u Beču (Croatian Academic Club in Vienna), 1948
- Komitet za prava gradišćanskih Hrvata (Committee on the Rights of the Burgenland Croats), 1972

In 1960, Diocese Eisenstadt (Željezno) was founded.

== Settlements ==
By the name and dialect there are these different groups of Burgeland Croats:

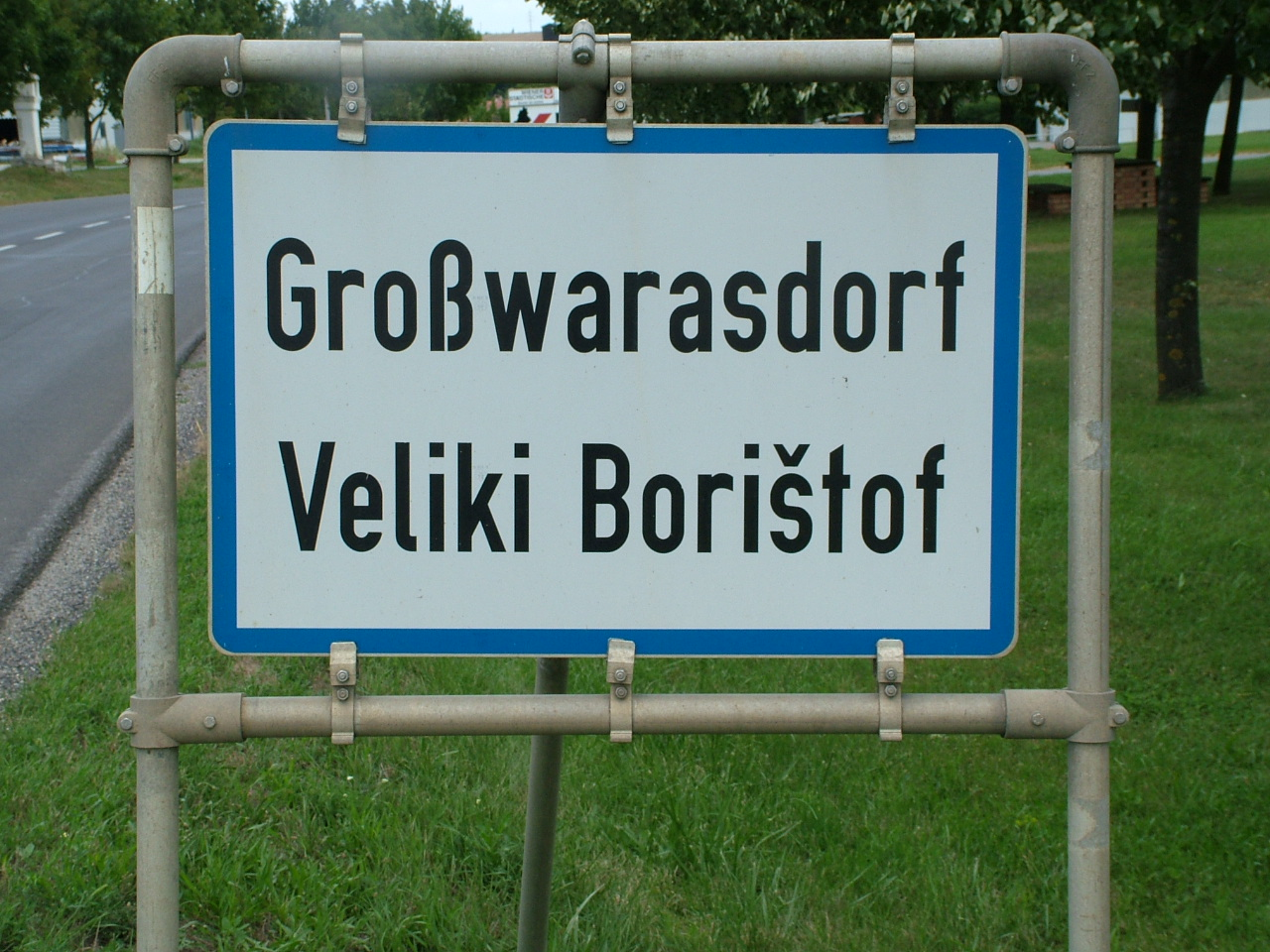
Bilingual Austrian-Croatian inscription in Burgenland

- Štoji- settled in the far south of Burgenland in villages: Pinkovac (Güttenbach), Nova Gora (Neuberg) and Stinjaki (Stinatz), is a Southern Chakavian dialect
- Vlahi- settled north of Štoji in the Croatian villages: Cikljin (Spitzzicken; Bandol (Weiden bei Rechnitz), Podgorje (Podgoria; they speak Štokavian), Stari Hodaš (Althodis), Sabara (Zuberbach), Čemba (Schandorf), Vincjet (Dürnbach), Ključarevac (Allersdorf), Čajta (Schachendorf), Rorigljin (Rauhriegel), is a Western Ikavian (Šćakavian) dialect with some similarities to Slavonian
- Dolinci- settled north of Vlahi and south of Poljanci. Their villages are: Bajngrob (Weingraben), Kalištrof (Kaisersdorf), Dolnja Pula (Unterpullendorf), Frakanava (Frankenau), Šuševo (Nebersdorf), Filež (Nikitsch), Gerištof (Kroatisch Geresdorf), Mučindrof (Großmutschen), Pervane (Kleinmutschen), Veliki Borištof (Großwarasdorf), Mali Borištof (Kleinwarasdorf), Longitolj (Langenthal) and Mjenovo (Kroatisch Minihof), is a Central Chakavian dialect
- Poljanci, settled east of the city of Mattersburg and west of Lake Neusiedl. Their villages are: Pajngrt (Baumgarten), Rasporak (Draßburg), Otava (Antau), Cogrštof (Zagersdorf), Klimpuh (Klingenbach), Cindrof (Siegendorf), Prodrštof (Wulkaprodersdorf), Trausdorf (Trausdorf), Uzlop (Oslip), Vorištan (Hornstein), Štikapron (Steinbrunn) and Celindof (Zillingtal), is a Central Chakavian dialect
- Haci- settled northeast of Lake Neusiedl. Their villages are: Pandrof (Parndorf), Novo Selo (Neudorf bei Parndorf) and Bijelo Selo (Pama), is a Central Chakavian dialect
- Grob dialect: a Central Chakavian or mixed Chakavian-Kajkavian dialect, spoken in Chorvátsky Grob etc. in Slovakia

== Hungary and Slovakia ==
Some Burgenland Croats live in Slovakia (Hrvatski Grob (Chorvátsky Grob), Hrvatski Jandrof (Jarovce), Devinsko Novo Selo (Devinska Nova Ves) and Čunovo, as well as in Hungary: Hrvatska Kemlja (Horvátkimle), Bizonja (Bezenye), Koljnof (Kópháza), Vedešin (Hidegség), Temerje (Tömörd), Plajgor (Ólmod), Petrovo Selo (Szentpéterfa), Hrvatske Šice (Horvátlövő), Gornji Čatar (Felsőcsatár), Umok (Fertőhomok), Narda, Hrvatski Židan (Horvátzsidány) Prisika (Peresznye) and Unda (Und).

== Culture ==
Tamburica is a part of Burgenland Croats' cultural identity. Around 40 tamburica orchestras were active among them. Orchestra "Tamburica Štikapron" was established in 1961. Since 2011, Croatian Culture Association in Burgenland (HKDG) organizes Festival klapov ("Klapa festival").

Burgenland Croats' Folklore ensemble Kolo Slavuj (Folklorni ansambl gradišćanskih Hrvatov Kolo Slavuj) is known for choreography of the Burgenland Croats folklore, created in collaboration with Ivan Ivančan.

== Sport ==
Croatian Cultural Association in Burgenland organizes annual Croatian Football Cup since 1989. There are few football clubs formed of Burgenland Croats: SV Nova Gora (from Neuberg), ASK Pajngrt, SC Filež (Nikitsch), ASKÖ Klimpuh (Klingenbach), ASKÖ Stinjaki (Stinatz), SC/ESV Pandrof (Pandorf), ASV Rasporak (Draßburg), SV Otava (Antau), SK Mali Borištof (Kleinwarasdorf) and ASV Cindrof (Siegendorf).

== See also ==
- Croats
- List of Croats
- Austria–Croatia relations
- Austrians of Croatia
- Carinthian Slovenes
- Bosnian Austrians
- Burgenland
- Croats in Slovakia
- Croats in the Czech Republic

== Sources ==
- "Povijest Gradišćanskih Hrvata do kraja 20. stoljeća" [History of Burgenland Croats until the end of the 20th century] (PDF). zigh.at (in Croatian). ZIGH.
