= Szentpéterfa =

Szentpéterfa Petrovo Selo
- Village
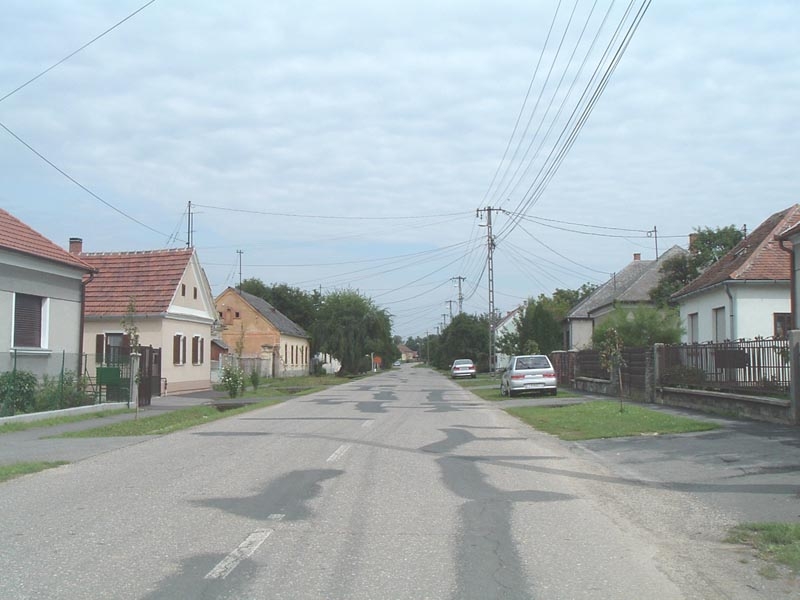

- Flag Coat of arms

- Location of Szentpéterfa
- Coordinates: 47.094444°N 16.479167°E
- Country: Hungary
- Region: Western Transdanubia
- County: Vas
- District: Szombathely

Area
  - Total: 31.24 km^{2} (12.06 sq mi)

Population (1 January 2026)
  - Total: 941
  - Density: 30.1/km^{2} (78.0/sq mi)
- Time zone: UTC+1 (CET)
  - Summer (DST): UTC+2 (CEST)
- Postal code: 9799
- Area code: (+36) 94
- Website: www.szentpeterfa.hu

Szentpéterfa (Croatian: Petrovo Selo; German: Prostrum) is a village in Vas County, Hungary.

== Famous people ==
- Stefan Geosits (* 1927), writer and translator of the Burgenland Croats
- Barnabás Varga (1994), footballer
