= Klingenbach =

- Municipality
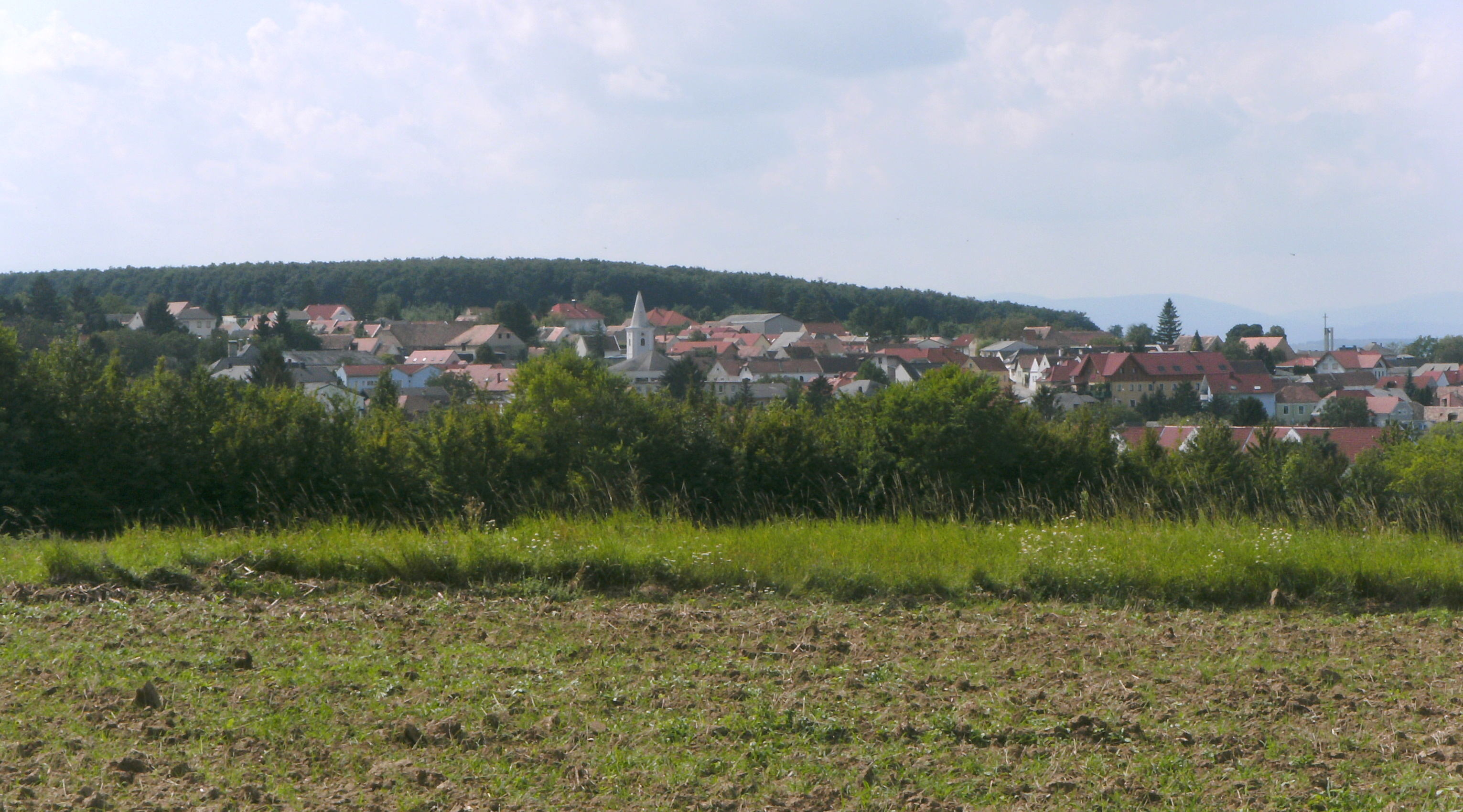
- Klingenbach

- Coat of arms

- Location within Austria Klingenbach (Austria)
- Coordinates: 47°45′N 16°32′E
- Country: Austria
- State: Burgenland
- District: Eisenstadt-Umgebung

Government
  - Mayor: Richard Frank (SPÖ)

Area
  - Total: 4.83 km^{2} (1.86 sq mi)

Population (2022-01-01)
  - Total: 1,255
  - Density: 260/km^{2} (673/sq mi)
- Time zone: UTC+1 (CET)
  - Summer (DST): UTC+2 (CEST)
- Postal code: 7013
- Area code: 02687

Klingenbach (German pronunciation: [ˈklɪŋənbax]; Hungarian: Kelénpatak, Croatian: Klimpuh) is a town in the Eisenstadt-Umgebung district in the Austrian state of Burgenland. It is located near the border with Hungary with a border crossing into Sopron.

== Population ==
Historical population
Year	Pop.	±%
1869	888	—
1880	943	+6.2%
1890	961	+1.9%
1900	1,122	+16.8%
1910	1,258	+12.1%
1923	1,353	+7.6%
1934	1,343	−0.7%
1939	1,312	−2.3%
1951	1,360	+3.7%
1961	1,249	−8.2%
1971	1,231	−1.4%
1981	1,166	−5.3%
1991	1,130	−3.1%
2001	1,189	+5.2%
2011	1,191	+0.2%
2021	1,223	+2.7%

Majority of population declares as Burgenland Croats.

== Culture ==
The branch of the Croatian Cultural Society from Gradišće (Croatian: Hrvatsko kulturno društvo u Gradišću) and the Tamburica Klimpuh tamburitza orchestra operate in the town.

CCS organizes annual Festival klapov ("Festival of klapas") with performers from Burgenland, Carinthia, Slovenia, Hungary, Croatia and Slovakia.

== Sport ==
- ASKÖ Klimpuh, football club, gathers Burgenland Croats

== Personalities ==
- Simon Knéfacz, writer
- Stefan Geosits, writer
