= Burgenland Croatian =

Regional variety of the Chakavian dialect of Croatian

- gradišćanskohrvatski jezik
- Native to: Austria, Hungary, Czech Republic, Slovakia
- Ethnicity: Burgenland Croats
- Native speakers: (19,000 (in Burgenland); 50,000–60,000 (all speakers) cited 2001 census)
- Language family: Indo-European: Balto-Slavic; Slavic; South Slavic; Western; Chakavian; Burgenland Croatian

Official status
- Recognised minority language in: Austria; Hungary

Language codes
- ISO 639-3: –
- Glottolog: burg1244
- ELP: Burgenland Croatian
- IETF: ckm-AT
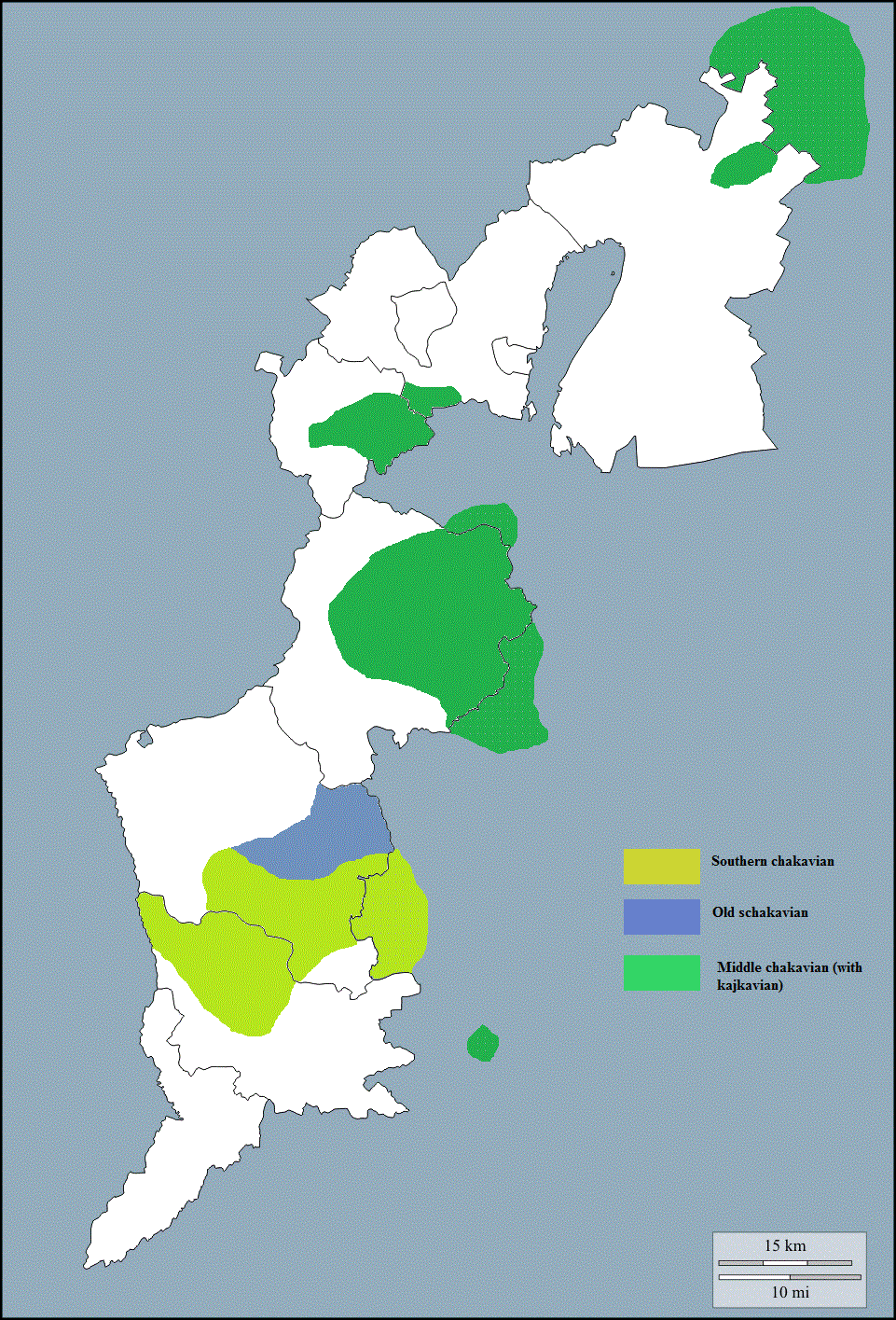
- Dialects of Burgenland Croats by Josip Lisac

- Burgenland Croatian is classified as Definitely Endangered by the UNESCO Atlas of the World's Languages in Danger (2010)

Burgenland Croatian (Note: gradišćanskohrvatski jezik; German: Burgenländisch-Kroatisch, Burgenlandkroatisch, burgenlandkroatische Sprache, burgenländisch-kroatischen Sprache; Hungarian: gradistyei horvát nyelv) is a regional variety of the Chakavian dialect of Croatian spoken in Austria, Hungary, the Czech Republic, and Slovakia. Burgenland Croatian is recognized as a minority language in the Austrian state of Burgenland, where it is spoken by 19,412 people according to official reports (2001). Many of the Burgenland Croatian speakers in Austria also live in Vienna and Graz, due to the process of urbanization, which is mostly driven by the poor economic situation of large parts of Burgenland.

Smaller Croatian minorities in western Hungary, southwestern Slovakia, and southern Czech Republic are often also called Burgenland Croats. They use the Burgenland Croatian written language and are historically and culturally closely connected to the Austrian Croats. The representatives of the Burgenland Croats estimate their total number in all three countries and emigration at around 70,000.

== Dialects ==
- Štoj dialect: dialect of the group "Štoji" (Güttenbach, Stinatz, Neuberg), is Southern Chakavian dialect with some Western Shtokavian features
- Vlah dialect: dialect of the "Vlahi" in Weiden bei Rechnitz, Zuberbach, Althodis, Schandorf, Dürnbach, Allersdorf, etc. due to some characteristics is considered a Western Shtokavian dialect, being a Schakavian Ikavian dialect without Neo-Shtokavian accent and with some similarities to Western Ikavian dialect and Slavonian dialect, but also has similarities and influences from neighboring Burgenland dialects
- Dolinci dialect: dialect of the "Dolinci" in Unterpullendorf, Frankenau, Kleinmutschen, etc. is a Central Chakavian dialect
- Poljan dialect: dialect of the "Poljanci" near Lake Neusiedl, is a Central Chakavian dialect
- Hati dialect: dialect of the "Hati" near Neusiedl, is a Central Chakavian dialect
- Grob dialect: Central Chakavian dialect, or mixed Chakavian-Kajkavian dialect, spoken in Chorvátsky Grob etc. in Slovakia

== History ==
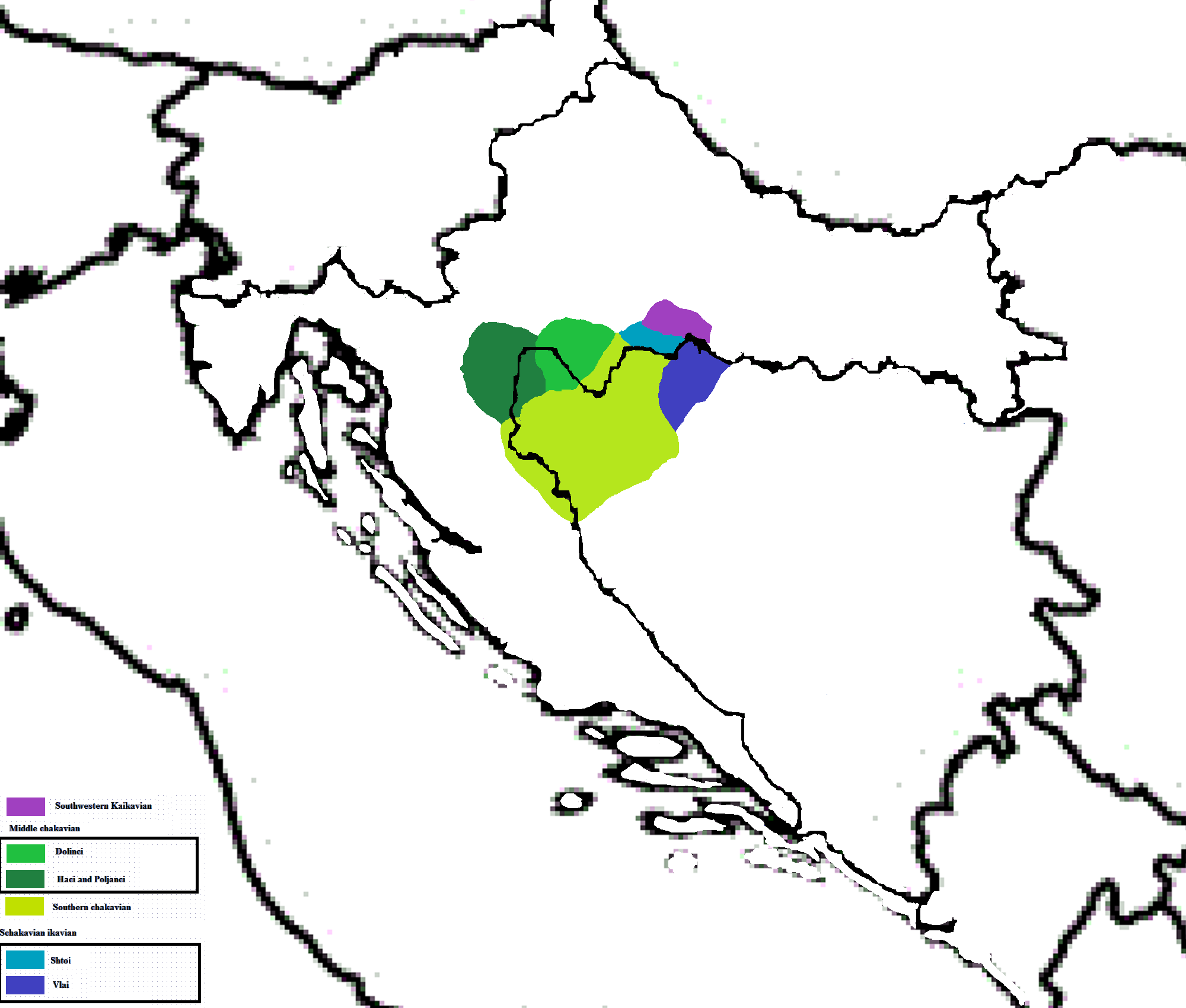
A map depicting the Una River origin theory for the Burgenland Croats

Burgenland Croatian was the language of Croatian refugees who fled Croatia during the Croatian–Ottoman wars and settled in the western part of what was then Hungary, the area where they still live. Burgenland Croats included speakers of all three dialects of the Croatian language (Shtokavian, Chakavian and Kajkavian), with the majority being the Chakavians. A part of them originally probably came from Dalmatia, and all of them mostly emigrated from the river Una valley.

Burgenland Croats did not take part in the shaping of the present standard Croatian in the 19th century. Instead, they constructed their own written standard based mainly on the local Chakavian speech and adopted the Croatian alphabet, a modified Latin alphabet, as their script.

It is still a matter of debate whether Burgenland Croatian should be classified as a Slavic micro-language of its own. Burgenland Croatian dialects are mostly viewed as isolated dialects of the Croatian.

Burgenland Croatian and the Prekmurje Slovene of Slovene (in Prekmurje and Hungary) have influenced each other. The first Prekmurje Slovene works (for example, the Old Hymnal of Martjanci) was applied to the Burgenland Croatian books. A few of those that wrote in Prekmurje Slovene were of Burgenland Croatian descent (for example Jakab Szabár) and also Burgenland Croatian (József Ficzkó).

After the dissolution of the Austro-Hungarian monarchy in 1918 the areas in which Burgenland Croats lived were divided between Austria, Czechoslovakia and Hungary. After 1921 most of these areas became part of Austria, which established a new province of Burgenland, after which the Croatian minority was named. In 1922 Austria founded the Apostolic administration of Burgenland and began to abolish bilingual schools through the introduction of the teaching of German in all primary schools. This process halted temporarily after the adoption of The National Education Act, which allowed for Croatian-language elementary schools. After Hitler's annexation of Austria in 1938 this law was abolished. In 1955 the Austrian State Treaty was signed. This permitted the Burgenland Croats to use Croatian in education, judiciary and public administration. With the adoption of the Law on National Minorities in 1976, use of Croatian in public life became further limited. As a result of the 1987 acceptance of a constitutional complaint, parts of the law were changed and Croatian was introduced as an official language in 6 out of 7 districts of Burgenland.

== Written language ==
Burgenland Croatian written language is based mainly on the local Chakavian dialect with some influences from the other Croatian dialects spoken in Burgenland. It uses the Latin alphabet with the same diacritical modifiers as the Croatian alphabet. In the course of language development it acquired some of its own specialised vocabulary, sometimes different from that used in standard Croatian.

The popular The Little Prince has also been translated into Burgenland Croatian (1998), specifically the Standard version by Ivan Rotter.

== Differences between Standard and Burgenland Croatian ==
=== Example words ===
English	Standard Croatian	Burgenland Croatian
black	crna	črna
word	riječ	rič
Jesus Christ	Isus Krist	Jezuš Kristuš
lower	donji	dolnji

== First books written in Burgenland Croatian ==
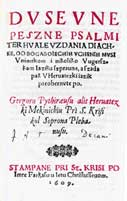
Grgur Mekinić: Dusevne peszne (Spiritual songs), is one of the first Burgenland Croatian artworks (1609).

The beginnings of literacy are linked to: Klimpuški misal (Klimpuški Missal) (1501), S. Consul Histrianus and Antun Dalmatin's Postila (Fasting) (1568), Duševne pesne (Duševne pesne, Spiritual songs) (1609) and Grgur Mekinić Pythiraeus's Druge kniige duševnih pesan (Druge knjige duševnih pesan, Other books of the Spiritual songs) (1611). Until the mid-19th century, the literature in Burgenland Croatian had religious character and was intended mostly for peasants. Main writers were priests and nuns. In the second half of the 19th century teachers began to write. Thanks to that, many school textbooks and calendars were written.

== Newspapers written in Burgenland Croatian ==
Newspapers of the Burgenland Croats are: Crikveni glasnik (Church Gazette), 1946; Naše selo (Our village), 1947; Naš tjednik (Our weekly), 1947; Naša domovina (Our homeland), 1952; Glas (Voice), 1957; Novi glas (New Voice), 1969; Put (Way), 1981).

== Writers writing in Burgenland Croatian ==
Most popular Burgenland Croat writers are: J. Mulih (1694–1754), Godefrid Palković (1714–78), L. Bogović (1719–89), E. M. Kragel (1725–88), M. Laáb (cca. 1746–1823), J. Ficko (1772–1843), M. Drobilić (1808–91), T. Jordan (1815–93), G. Glavanić (1833–72), M. Naković (1840–1900), I. Mušković (1848–1930), M. Borenić (1850–1939), Ivan Čuković (1865–1944), P. Jandrišević (1879–1938), I. Blažević (1888–1946), Mate Meršić Miloradić (1850–1928), Ignac Horvat (1895–1973), Martin Meršić, A. Blazović (1921–2004), Franz Probst (1919–93), N. Benčić (b. 1938), Ivan (Lav) Sučić (b. 1938), Mathilda Bölcs (b. 1949), J. Čenar (b. 1956), P. Tyran (b. 1955) and H. Gassner (b. 1955).

== The Lord's Prayer in Slovene, Burgenland Croatian (1830 and 2021), and Standard Croatian ==
Slovene

Oče naš, ki si v nebesih,
posvečeno bodi tvoje ime,
pridi k nam tvoje kraljestvo,
zgodi se tvoja volja
kakor v nebesih tako na zemlji.
Daj nam danes naš vsakdanji kruh
in odpusti nam naše dolge,
kakor tudi mi odpuščamo svojim dolžnikom,
in ne vpelji nas v skušnjavo,
temveč reši nas hudega.
Amen.

Burgenland Croatian (1830)

Otacz naß, ki szi na nebeszi!
Szvéti sze jime tvoje.
Pridi kralyesztvo tvoje.
Budi volya tvoja,
kako na nébi, tako na zemlyi.
Kruh naß szakidanyi dai nam ga denasz.
Odpuszti nam duge naße,
kot i mi odpuschamo duzsnikom naßim.
I ne zapelyai nasz va szkusavanye,
nego odszlobodi nasz od zla.
Amen.

Burgenland Croatian (2021)

Oče naš, ki si na nebesi,
sveti se ime tvoje,
pridi kraljevstvo tvoje,
budi volja tvoja,
kako na nebu tako i na zemlji.
Kruh naš svakidanji daj nam danas,
i otpusti nam duge naše,
kako i mi otpušćamo dužnikom našim,
i ne zapeljaj nas u skušavanje,
nego oslobodi nas od zla.
Amen.

Croatian

Oče naš, koji jesi na nebesima,
sveti se ime tvoje,
dođi kraljevstvo tvoje,
budi volja tvoja,
kako na nebu tako i na zemlji.
Kruh naš svagdanji daj nam danas,
i otpusti nam duge naše,
kako i mi otpuštamo dužnicima našim,
i ne uvedi nas u napast,
nego izbavi nas od zla.
Amen.

== See also ==
- Minority languages of Austria
- Dialects of Serbo-Croatian
