= Grgur Mekinić =

Protestant writer

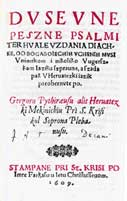
Grgur Mekinić: Dusevne peszne (Spiritual songs), is one of the first Burgenland Croatian artworks (1609).

Grgur Mekinić (Gregorius Pythiraeus; 1534 – 4 March 1617) was a Protestant writer and poet notable for his literary activities among Burgenland Croats. He is the author of two religious songbooks published in Burgenland Croatian language; Dusevne peszne, published in 1609, Druge knjige duševnih pesan in 1611, both being dedicated to count Nikola VI Zrinski. He died in Keresztur, Hungary (today Deutschkreutz, Burgenland in Austria) on 4 March 1617.

In 2017, a plaque was unveiled in Deutschkreuz, dedicated to Mekinić.

== See also ==
- Stjepan Konzul Istranin
