= Nikitsch =

Nikitsch Filež
- Municipality
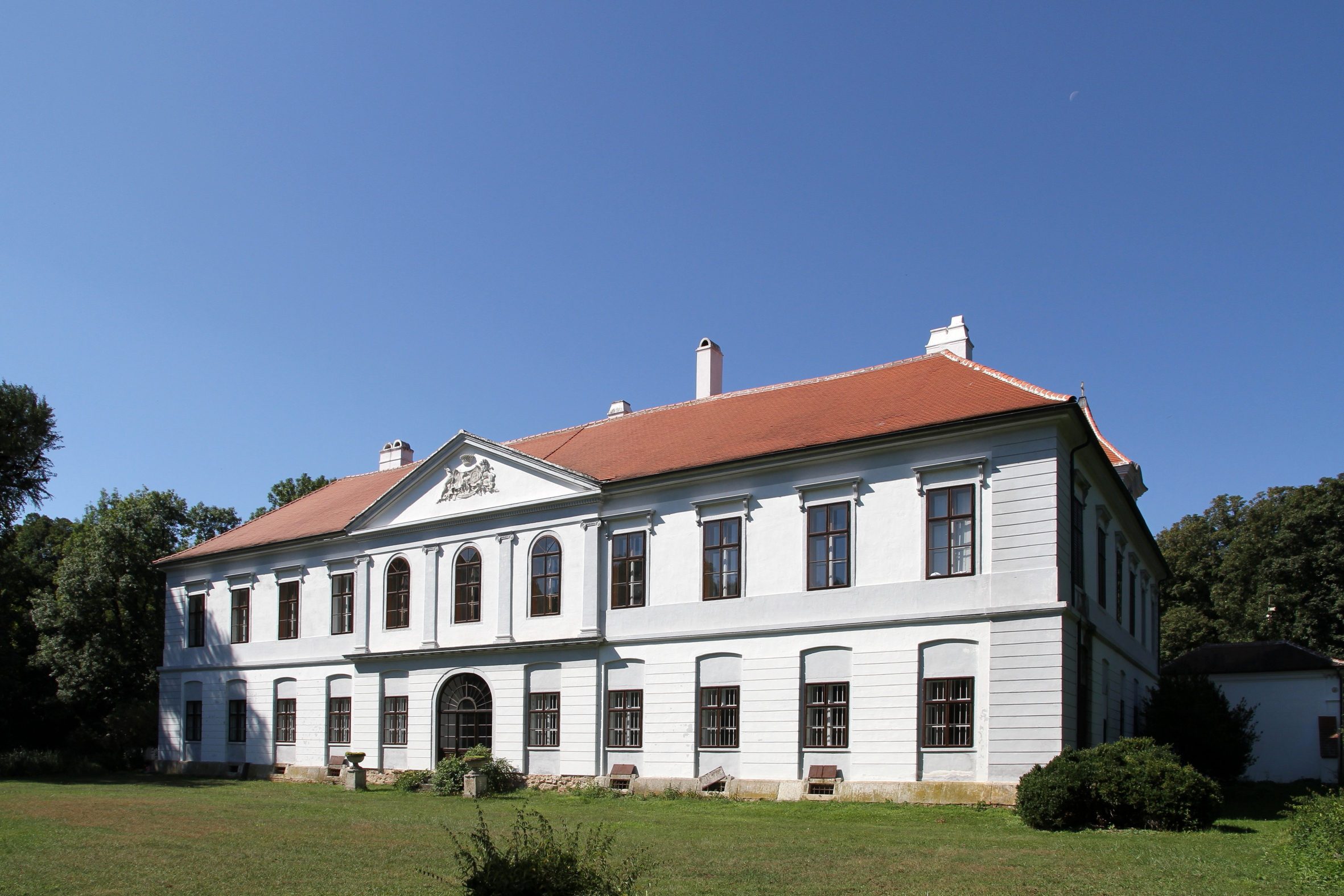
- Palace in Nikitsch

- Coat of arms

- Location within Austria
- Coordinates: 47°32′N 16°40′E
- Country: Austria
- State: Burgenland
- District: Oberpullendorf

Government
  - Mayor: Johann Balogh (SPÖ)

Area
  - Total: 50.76 km^{2} (19.60 sq mi)
- Elevation: 228 m (748 ft)

Population (2018-01-01)
  - Total: 1,405
  - Density: 27.68/km^{2} (71.69/sq mi)
- Time zone: UTC+1 (CET)
  - Summer (DST): UTC+2 (CEST)
- Postal code: 7302
- Website: www.gemeinde-nikitsch.at/

Nikitsch (German: [ˈnɪkɪtʃ]; Croatian: Filež; Hungarian: Füles) is a town in the district of Oberpullendorf in the Austrian state of Burgenland in Austria. About 87% of the town's inhabitants are Burgenland Croats, the highest percentage of any town in Burgenland. In 1971, the towns of Kroatisch Geresdorf (Gerištof, Gyirót), Kroatisch Minihof (Mjenovo, Malomháza), and Nikitsch were merged to form the present town.

== Population ==
Historical population
Year	Pop.	±%
1869	3,208	—
1880	3,438	+7.2%
1890	3,550	+3.3%
1900	3,866	+8.9%
1910	3,797	−1.8%
1923	3,962	+4.3%
1934	4,005	+1.1%
1939	3,695	−7.7%
1951	3,433	−7.1%
1961	2,917	−15.0%
1971	2,316	−20.6%
1981	1,948	−15.9%
1991	1,685	−13.5%
2001	1,562	−7.3%
2011	1,446	−7.4%

== Sport ==
- SC Filež, football club of Burgenland Croats

== Gallery ==
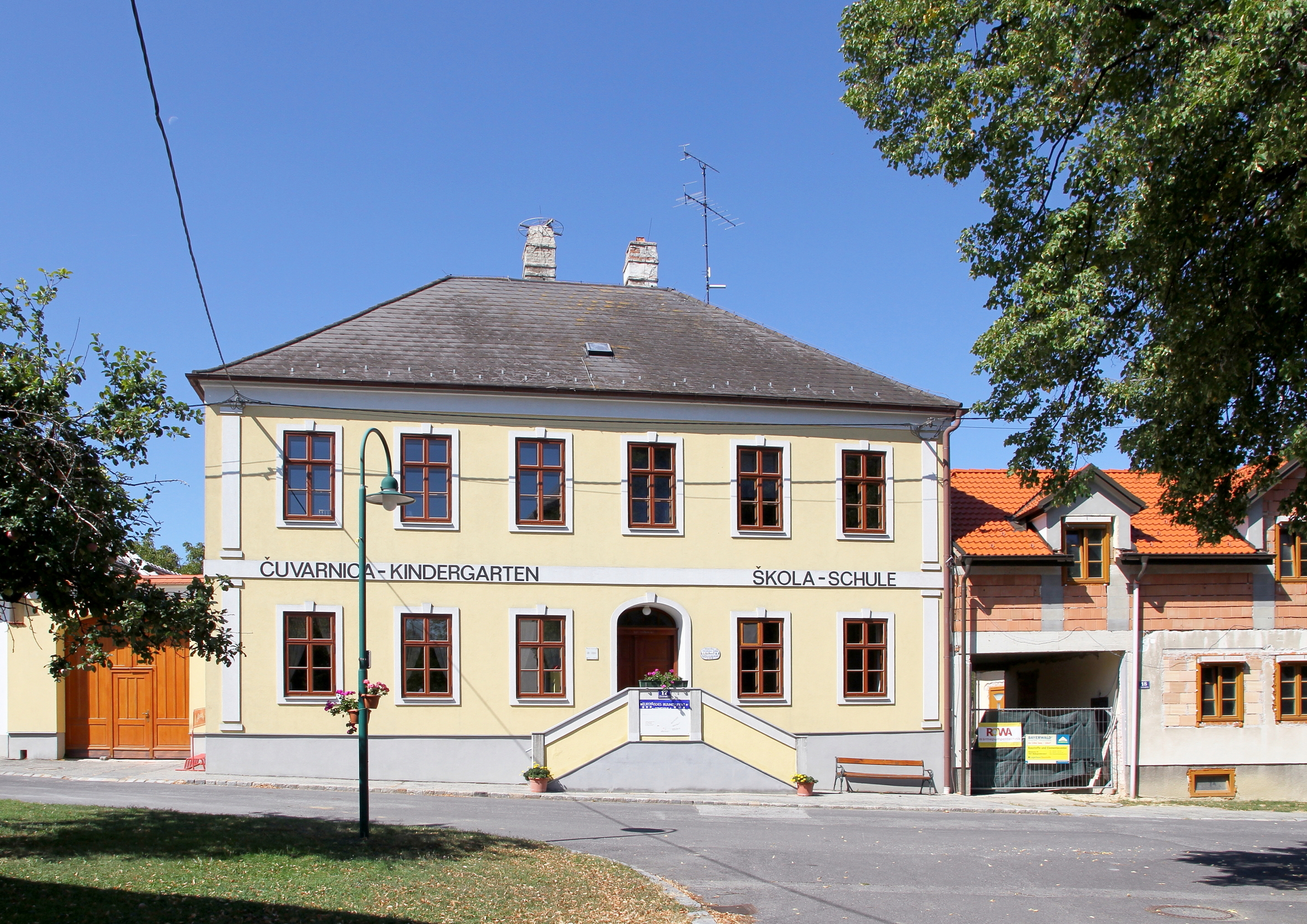
Kindergarten

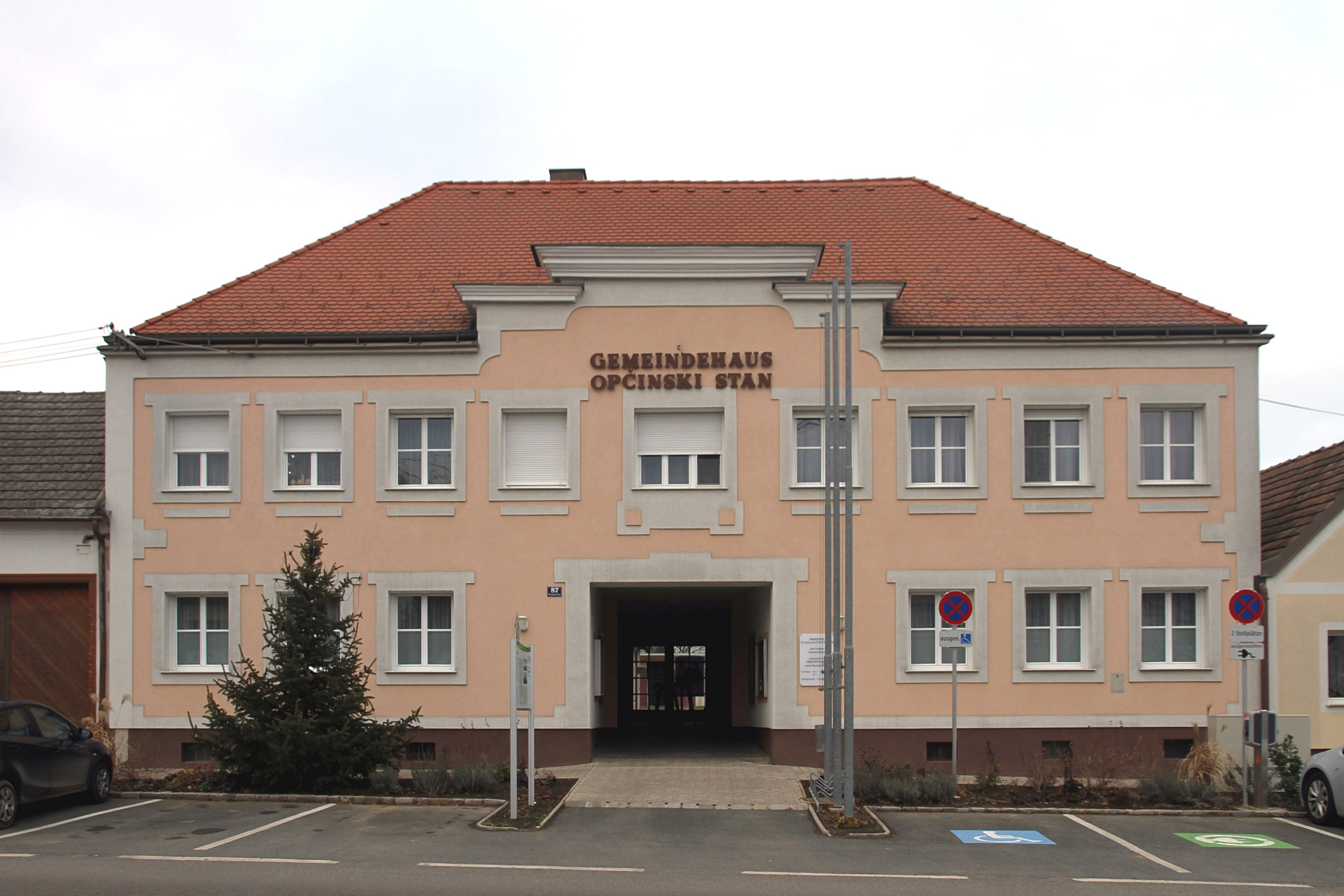
Nikitsch municipal office

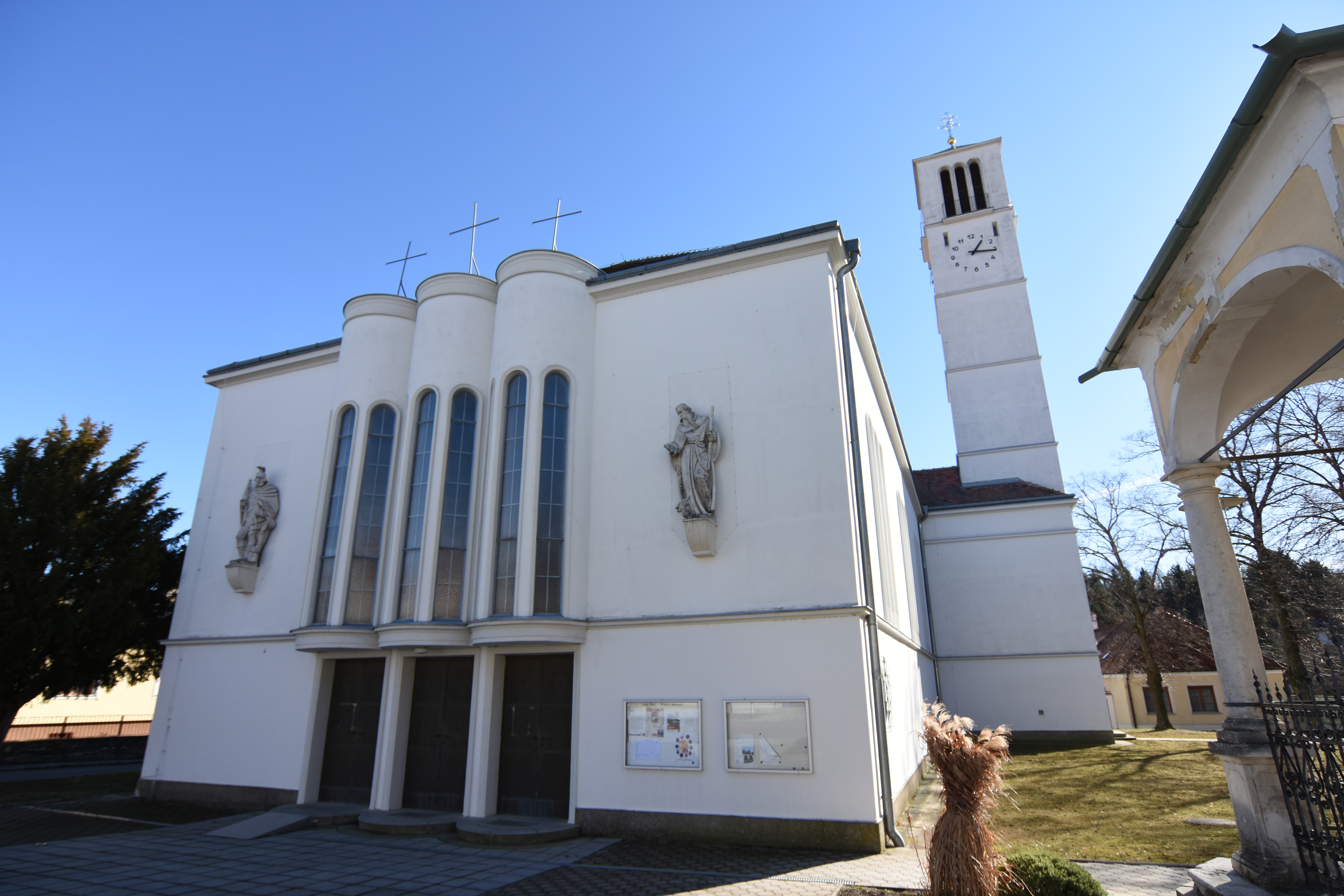
Parish church
