= Neuberg im Burgenland =

- Municipality
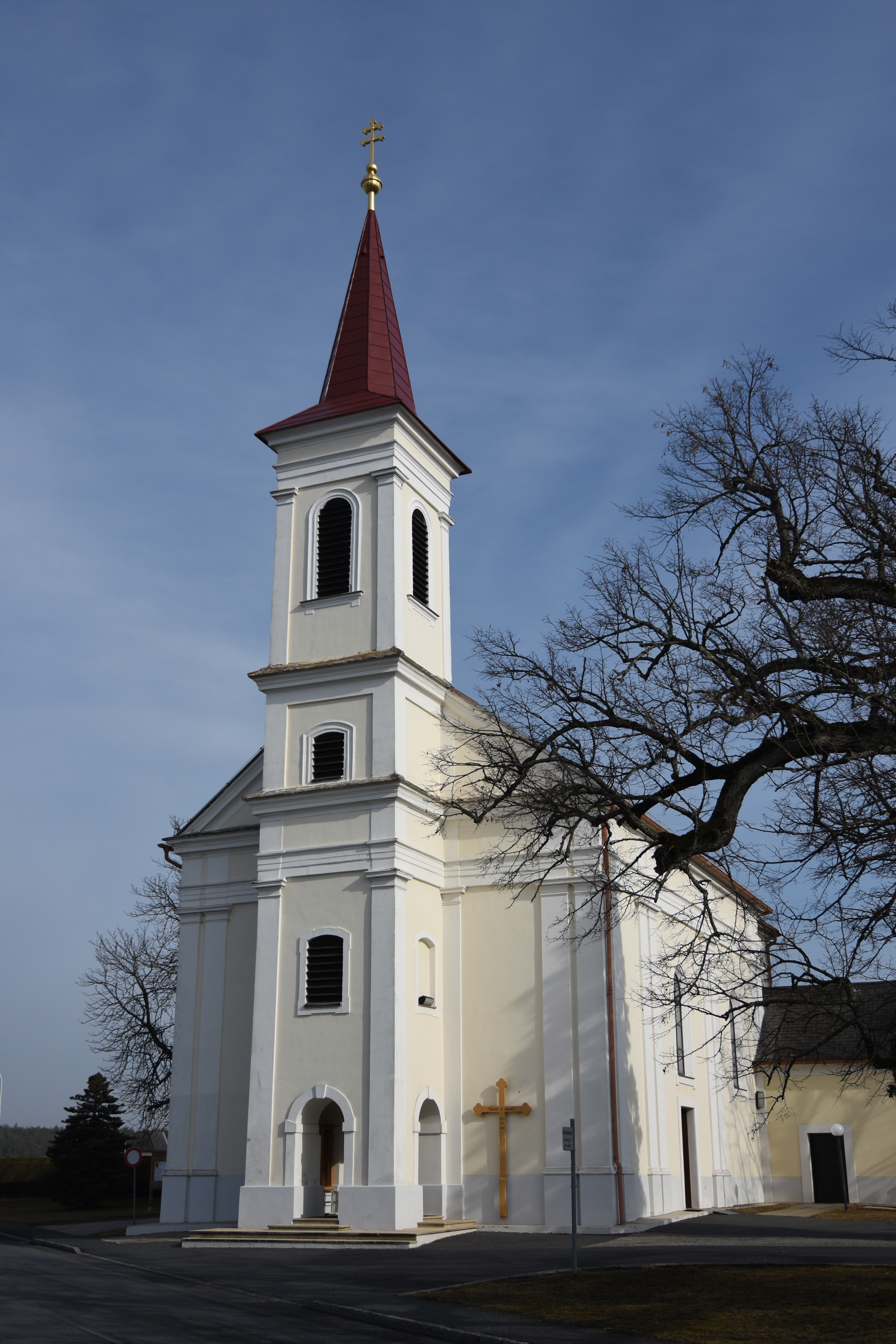
- Neuberg im Burgenland parish church

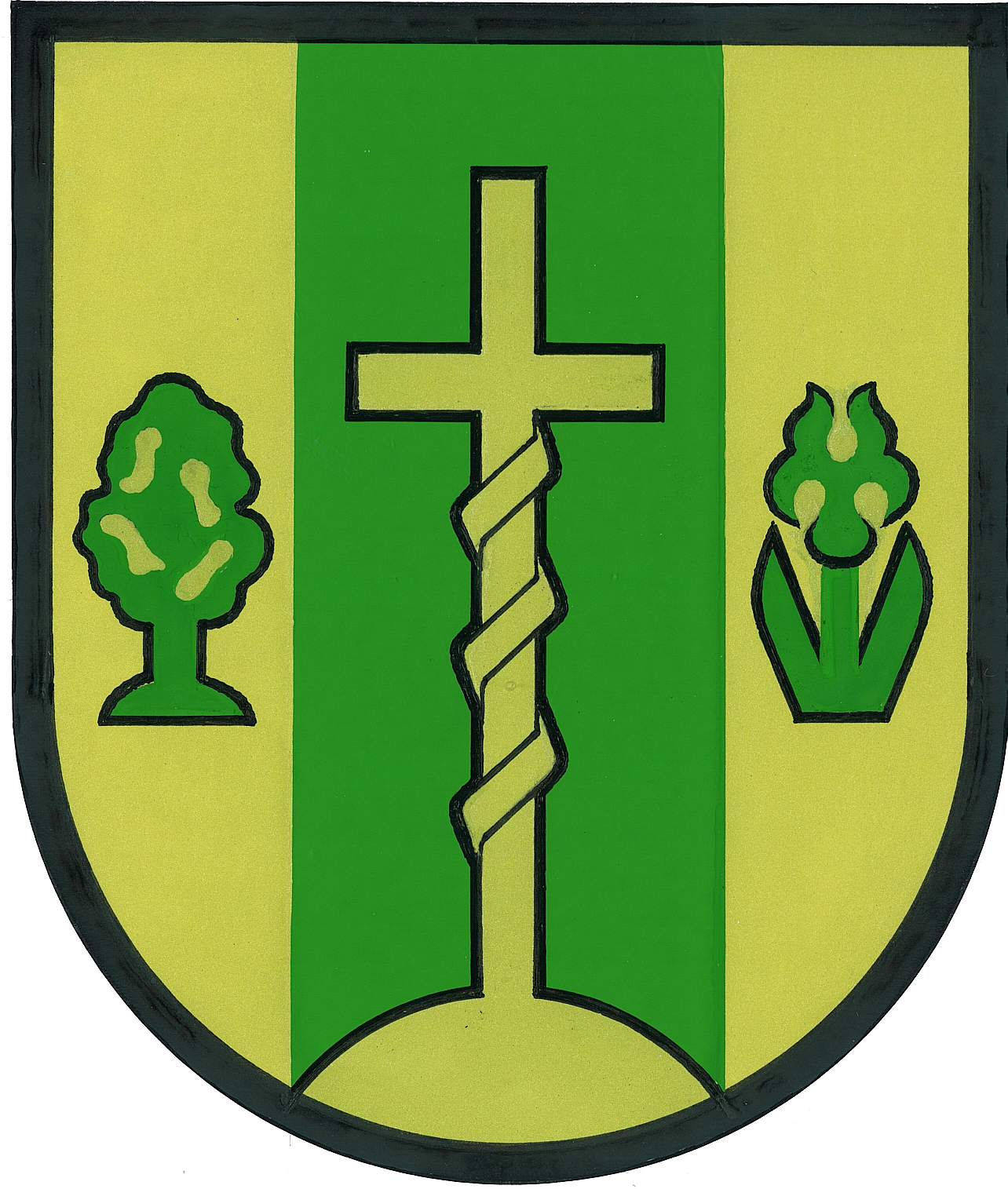
- Coat of arms

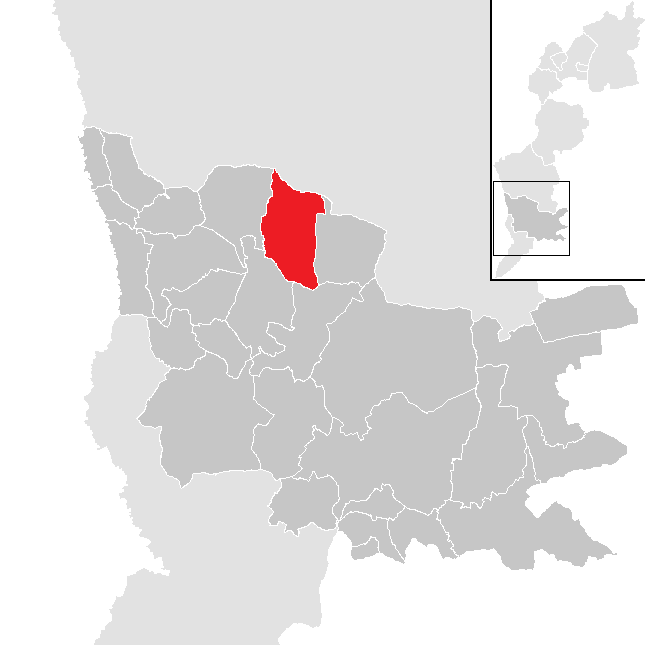
- Location within Güssing district

- Location within Austria
- Coordinates: 47°10′N 16°16′E
- Country: Austria
- State: Burgenland
- District: Güssing

Government
  - Mayor: Thomas Novoszel (ÖVP)

Area
  - Total: 17.61 km^{2} (6.80 sq mi)

Population (2018-01-01)
  - Total: 978
  - Density: 55.5/km^{2} (144/sq mi)
- Time zone: UTC+1 (CET)
  - Summer (DST): UTC+2 (CEST)
- Postal code: 7535
- Website: www. neuberg-bgld.at

Neuberg im Burgenland (Croatian: Nova Gora, Hungarian: Újhegy) is a town in the district of Güssing in the Austrian state of Burgenland.

== Population ==
Historical population
Year	Pop.	±%
1869	961	—
1880	1,073	+11.7%
1890	1,164	+8.5%
1900	1,259	+8.2%
1910	1,237	−1.7%
1923	1,126	−9.0%
1934	1,211	+7.5%
1939	1,033	−14.7%
1951	1,153	+11.6%
1961	1,114	−3.4%
1971	1,128	+1.3%
1981	1,150	+2.0%
1991	1,078	−6.3%
2001	1,072	−0.6%
2011	1,026	−4.3%
2021	968	−5.7%

== Sport ==
- SV Nova Gora, football club of Burgenland Croats
