= Jakab Szabár =

Jakab Szabár (Slovene: Jakob Sabar, around 15 July 1802 or 1803 – 14 December 1863) was a writer and Roman Catholic priest. Szabár was a Hungarian Croat who wrote in the Prekmurje dialect and Hungarian.

He was born in Horvátzsidány, Vas, near Kőszeg. His parents were József Szabár and Ilonka Csárics. Szabár went to school in Szombathely and Kőszeg. He was ordained in 1826 and was Ferenc Bernyák's curate in Vashidegkút for one year, and was then relocated by the bishopric to Bántornya. From 1833 to 1835, Szabár was a priest in Felsőszentbenedek, and for 21 years in Felsőlendva.

Szabár mainly wrote religious works and supported Magyarization. His work Szveta krizsna pout (Way of the Cross) was written in the Prekmurje dialect.

At the age of 61, Jakab Szabár died in Cserföld, Hungary.

== See also ==
- List of Slovene writers and poets in Hungary
