= Horvátzsidány =

Horvátzsidány Hrvatski Židan
- Flag Coat of arms

- Location of Horvátzsidány in Hungary
- Coordinates: 47°24′37″N 16°37′34″E
- Country: Hungary
- Region: Western Transdanubia
- County: Vas
- Subregion: Kőszegi
- Rank: Village

Area
  - Total: 12.17 km^{2} (4.70 sq mi)

Population (1 January 2008)
  - Total: 787
  - Density: 64.7/km^{2} (167/sq mi)
- Time zone: UTC+1 (CET)
  - Summer (DST): UTC+2 (CEST)
- Postal code: 9733
- Area code: +36 94
- KSH code: 16887
- Website: www.horvatzsidany.tvn.hu

Horvátzsidány (Croatian: Hrvatski Židan) is a small village in Vas County, Hungary. Writer Jakab Szabár was born here.
