= Ventral nervous system defective =

Homeobox protein vnd

Identifiers
- Organism: Drosophila melanogaster
- Symbol: vnd
- PDB: 1nk3
- UniProt: P22808
Search for
- Structures: Swiss-model
- Domains: InterPro

The ventral nervous system defective (vnd) gene present in fruit flies of the genus Drosophila functions during embryonic brain development and is necessary for the formation and specification of neural cell lineages. This transcription factor is expressed in all brain neuromeres and functions as a columnar patterning gene in the early stages of cell differentiation. Vnd is important in cell development as well as cell maintenance during embryogenesis due to the expression of the gene in both the developing neural cells and the specified neuromeres. Knockout experiments of vnd reveal similar axonal defects as the knockout of the Hox gene labial (lab). Like the Hox genes, vnd is required for specification along the dorsoventral axis. Mutant vnd produce the loss of tritocerebral neural lineages as well as neuromeres, therefore this gene is crucial for the development of these cell lineages. Without proper vnd expression throughout Drosophila embryonic development, the brain would not become functional.
