= Siegendorf =

- Municipality
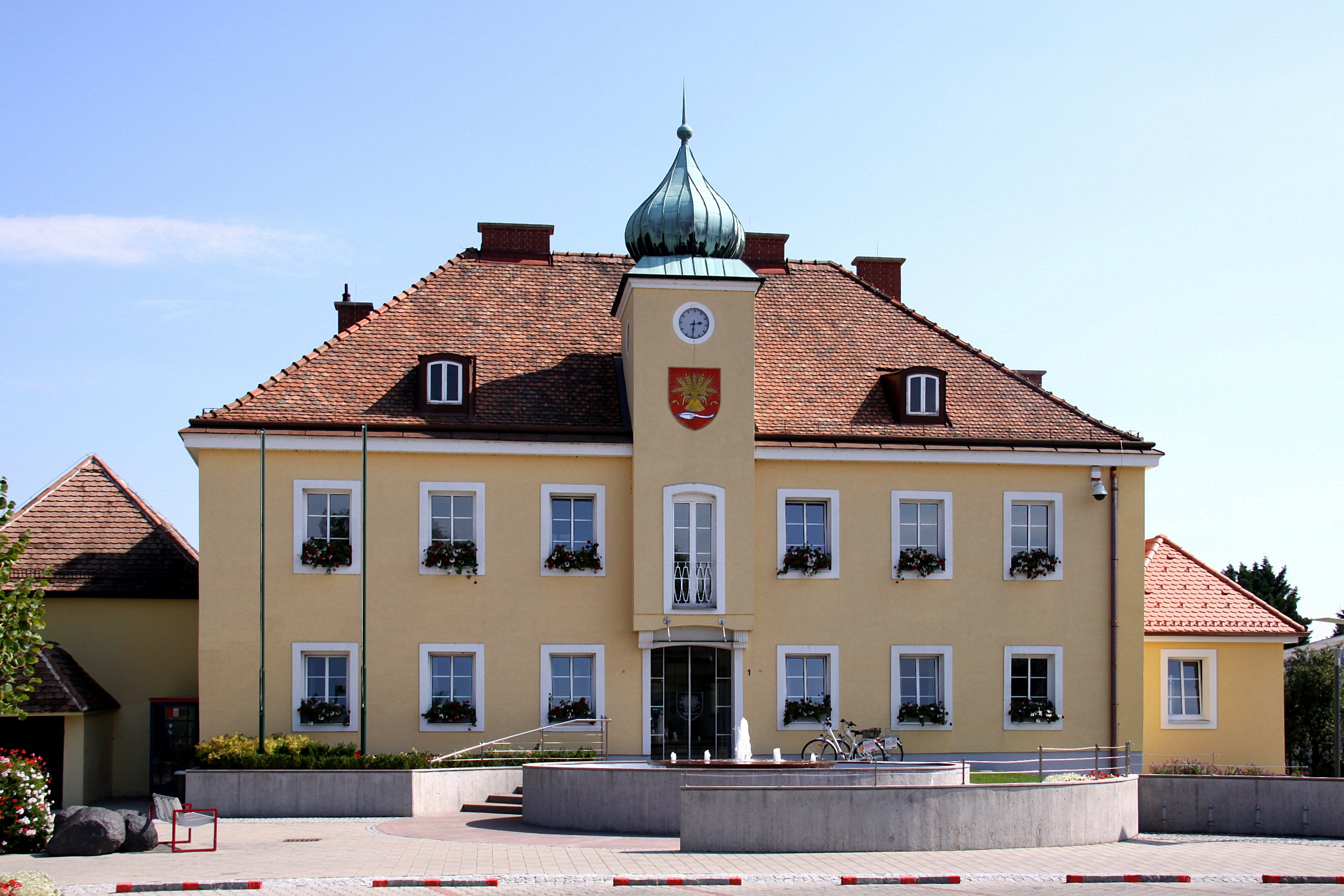
- Municipal office

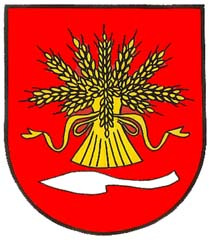
- Coat of arms

- Location within Austria Siegendorf (Austria)
- Coordinates: 47°47′N 16°32′E
- Country: Austria
- State: Burgenland
- District: Eisenstadt-Umgebung

Government
  - Mayor: Rainer Porics (SPÖ)

Area
  - Total: 23.06 km^{2} (8.90 sq mi)
- Elevation: 176 m (577 ft)

Population (2022-01-01)
  - Total: 3,203
  - Density: 138.9/km^{2} (359.7/sq mi)
- Time zone: UTC+1 (CET)
  - Summer (DST): UTC+2 (CEST)
- Postal code: 7011
- Website: www.siegendorf.at

Siegendorf (Croatian: Cindrof, Hungarian: Cinfalva) is a town in the district of Eisenstadt-Umgebung in the Austrian state of Burgenland.

== History ==
During World War II, a forced labor camp staffed by Hungarian Arrow Cross guards forced Jewish men from northern Transylvania located in Hungarian-occupied Romania, was located in Siegendorf. Nearly all of the inmates were executed by the Hungarian guards as the Soviet forces were approaching when the guards pretended to want to march the Jewish inmates to an unknown location. Very few prisoners survived. Almost none of them documented their experience at this camp except one former inmate who incorrectly claims to be the "sole" survivor. Bear in mind, many survivors were not articulate and did not care to memorialize this experience in writing. But they have passed their experience along via their children and/or grandchildren. The Jewish slaves at the Siegendorf Camp were enslaved in a local gold mine.

== Population ==
Historical population
Year	Pop.	±%
1869	1,585	—
1880	1,589	+0.3%
1890	1,591	+0.1%
1900	1,886	+18.5%
1910	1,938	+2.8%
1923	2,077	+7.2%
1934	2,363	+13.8%
1939	2,247	−4.9%
1951	2,387	+6.2%
1961	2,400	+0.5%
1971	2,454	+2.2%
1981	2,402	−2.1%
1991	2,446	+1.8%
2001	2,720	+11.2%
2011	2,902	+6.7%
2021	3,118	+7.4%

== Sport ==
- ASV Cindorf, football club of Burgenland Croats
