= Und, Hungary =

Und
- Coat of arms

- Location of Győr-Moson-Sopron county in Hungary

- Location of Und
- Coordinates: 47.48869°N 16.69634°E
- Country: Hungary
- County: Győr-Moson-Sopron

Area
  - Total: 6.79 km^{2} (2.62 sq mi)

Population (2004)
  - Total: 342
  - Density: 50.36/km^{2} (130.4/sq mi)
- Time zone: UTC+1 (CET)
  - Summer (DST): UTC+2 (CEST)
- Postal code: 9464
- Area code: 99

Und is a village in Győr-Moson-Sopron county, Hungary.
