= Weiden bei Rechnitz =

- Municipality
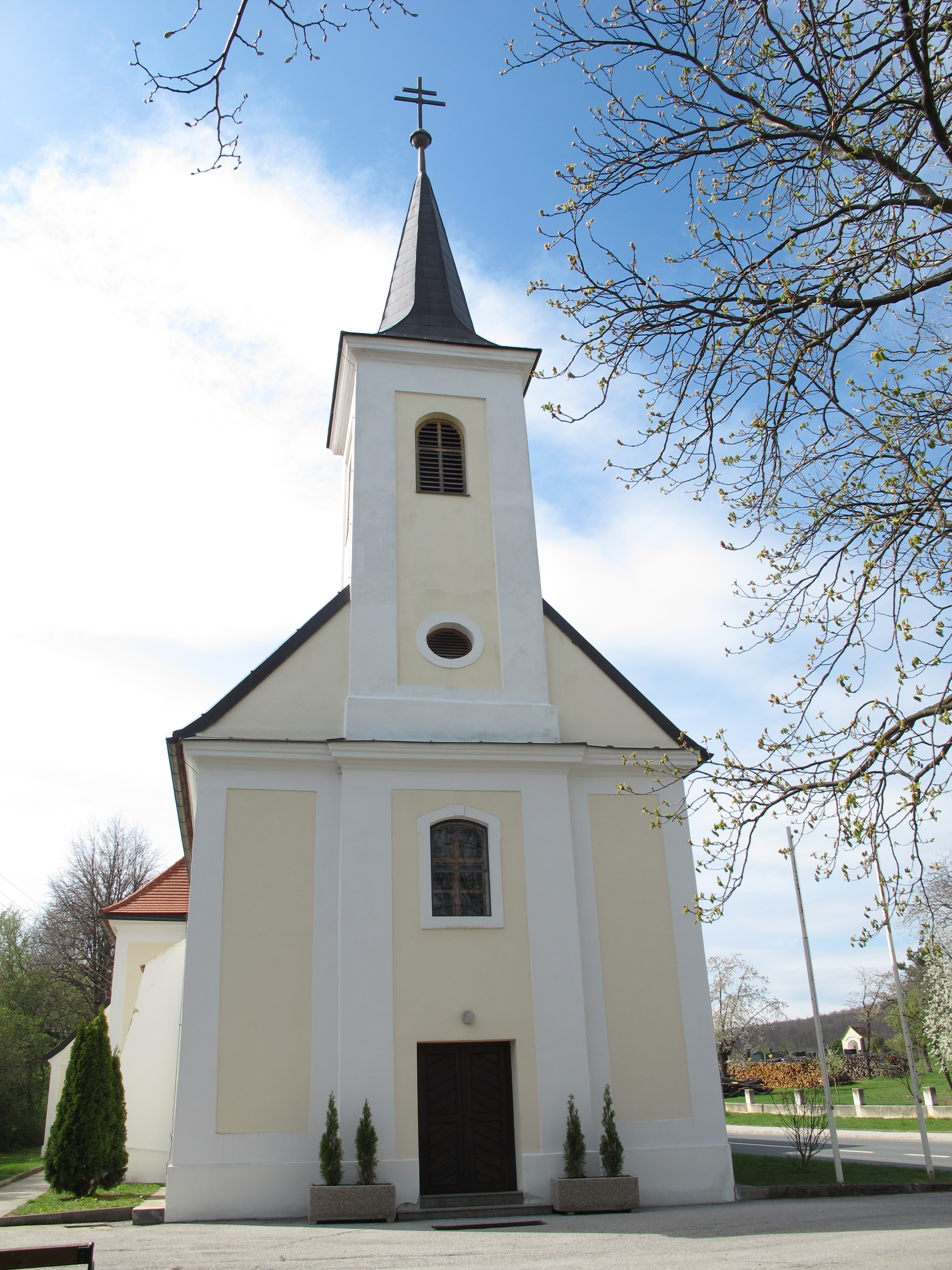
- Church of Saint John of Nepomuk

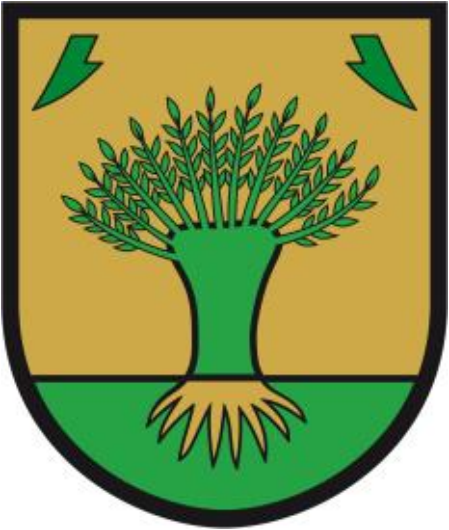
- Coat of arms

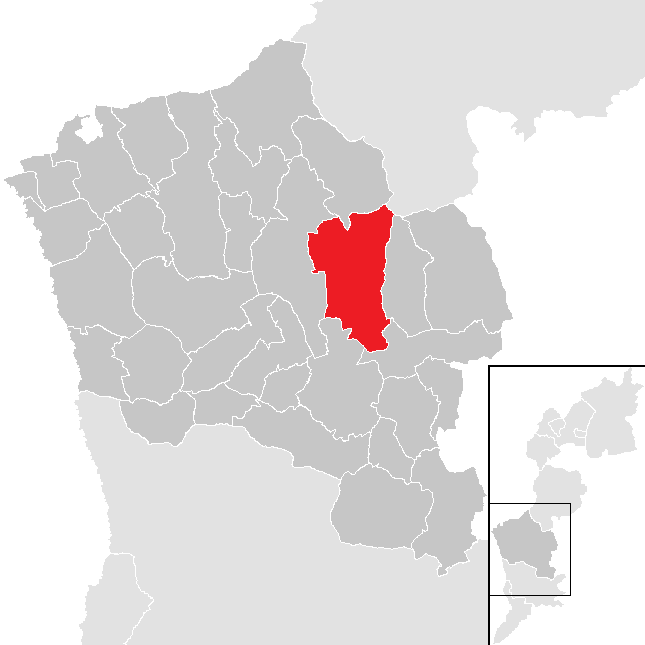
- Location within Oberwart district

- Location within Austria
- Coordinates: 47°18′N 16°21′E
- Country: Austria
- State: Burgenland
- District: Oberwart

Government
  - Mayor: Wilhelm Müller (ÖVP)

Area
  - Total: 39.84 km^{2} (15.38 sq mi)
- Elevation: 330 m (1,080 ft)

Population (2018-01-01)
  - Total: 824
  - Density: 20.7/km^{2} (53.6/sq mi)
- Time zone: UTC+1 (CET)
  - Summer (DST): UTC+2 (CEST)
- Postal code: 7463
- Website: https://www.weiden-rechnitz.at/

Weiden bei Rechnitz (Croatian: Bandol, Hungarian: Bándol) is a town in the district of Oberwart in the Austrian state of Burgenland.

== Population ==
Historical population
Year	Pop.	±%
1869	2,192	—
1880	2,271	+3.6%
1890	2,195	−3.3%
1900	2,062	−6.1%
1910	2,081	+0.9%
1923	1,937	−6.9%
1934	1,842	−4.9%
1939	1,692	−8.1%
1951	1,692	+0.0%
1961	1,468	−13.2%
1971	1,281	−12.7%
1981	1,210	−5.5%
1991	1,057	−12.6%
2001	954	−9.7%
2011	969	+1.6%
