= Ivanuš Pergošić =

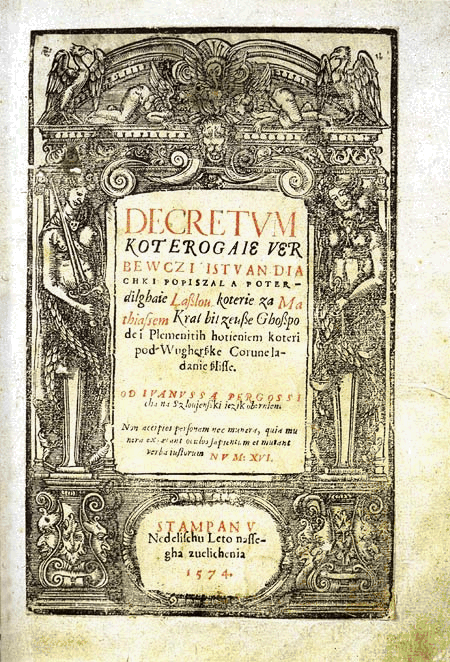
- Cover page of Pergošić's Decretum
- Born: 1521; Kingdom of Slavonia, Habsburg monarchy
- Died: 1592 (aged 70–71)

Ivanuš Pergošić (1521-1592) (Latin: Ioannes Pergossich) was an early Kajkavian author from Habsburg Slavonia and author of the 1574 translation of Tripartitum (written by István Werbőczy) which is the first printed Kajkavian book.

In 1564, Pergošić was a rector of a school in Zagreb. He was one of four most important members of the Varaždin literary circle, besides Antun Vramec, Blaž Škrinjarić and Blaž Antilović. Pergošić was tolerant to Protestantism.

== Decretum ==
Pergošić published his works in Zagreb and Varaždin. In 1574, he printed a translation of Tripartitum written by István Werbőczy. Pergošić referred to the language he used in this translation (titled Decretum) as Slavic (Szlouienski in original, Serbo-Croatian: jazik slavjanski), and in its preface Pergošić emphasized that it was written for "Slavs and Croats". It is assumed that he used terms Slavs and Croats to refer to the people of two administrative regions of Habsburg monarchy (Kingdom of Slavonia and Kingdom of Croatia) without any sort of ethnic connotation. Pergošić's 1574 translation of Tripartitum is considered the first book printed in Kajkavian and the first printed work of Kajkavian literature.

== Sources ==
- John V. A. Fine (5 February 2010). When Ethnicity Did Not Matter in the Balkans: A Study of Identity in Pre-Nationalist Croatia, Dalmatia, and Slavonia in the Medieval and Early-Modern Periods. University of Michigan Press. ISBN 978-0-472-02560-2.
- Institut (1998). Encyclopaedia moderna. Institut za filozofiju znanosti i mir Jugoslaenske akademije znanosti i umjetnosti.
- Alojz Jembrih (1996). Kajkaviana croatica: hrvatska kajkavska riječ. Braća hrvatskoga zmaja. ISBN 978-953-6040-04-9.
- Zavod (2007). Radovi (Filozofski Fakultet Zagreb. Humanisticke i Drustvene Znanosti). Zavod.
- Mohorovičić, Andre (1983). Varaždinski zbornik: 1181-1981 : zbornik radova sa znanstvenog skupa održanog u Varaždinu od 1. do 3. lisopada 1981. godine povodom obilježavanja 800. godišnjice grada. Jugoslavenska akademija znanosti i umjetnosti.
- Leykam (2007). Hrvatska i Slavonija u ranome novom vijeku. Leykam international. ISBN 978-953-7534-01-1.
- Štefanec, Nataša (2001). Heretik Njegova Veličanstva: povijest o Jurju IV. Zrinskom i njegovu rodu. Barbat. ISBN 978-953-181-036-4.
