= Bucic =

Bucic, as a title without diacritical marks, may refer to:

- Bučić, a village in Serbia
- Mihajlo Bučić, a 16th-century Catholic priest
