= Origin of the Székelys =

History of Hungarian people subgroup

Scholarly theories about the origin of the Székelys (a subgroup of the Hungarian people) can be divided into four main groups. Medieval chronicles unanimously stated that the Székelys were descended from the Huns and settled in the Carpathian Basin centuries before the Hungarians (or Magyars) conquered the territory in the late 9th century. This theory is refuted by most modern specialists. According to a widely accepted modern hypothesis, the Székelys were originally a Turkic people who joined the Magyars in the Pontic steppes. Another well-known theory states that the Székelys are simply Magyars, descended from the border guards of the Kingdom of Hungary who settled in the easternmost region of the Carpathian Basin and preserved their special privileges for centuries. According to a fourth theory, the Székelys' origin can be traced back to the Late Avar population of the Carpathian Basin.

== Medieval and Early modern period ==
Medieval chronicles associated the Székelys with the Huns, also claiming that both the Huns and the Hungarians were descended from the Scythians. Medieval scholars also agreed that the Székelys had already been present in the Carpathian Basin before the Hungarians (or Magyars) conquered the territory. The early 13th-century Gesta Hungarorum was the first to mention that the Székelys "were previously the peoples" of Attila the Hun. According to the same source, the Székelys "gave their sons as hostages along with diverse gifts" to the Hungarian chieftain, Ősbő, at the Körös River before joining his campaign against Menumorut.

Simon of Kéza stated that the Székelys were "remnants of the Huns" who "remained on the field of Csigla" after the fall of the Hunnic Empire. In contrast with the Gesta Hungarorum, Kéza said, the Székelys joined the Hungarians "on the borders of Ruthenia" when the Hungarians crossed the Carpathian Mountains. All subsequent Hungarian chronicles repeated Kéza's story and most scholars accepted the identification of the Székelys with the Huns for centuries. The theory was also mentioned in István Werbőczy's Tripartitum, which was published several times in Székely Land after 1517. As a consequence, it cannot be decided whether the Székelys' well-documented own tradition of their Hunnic origin is a genuine part of their folklore, or it is only an adoption of a medieval scholarly fabrication. Most Székelys still regard themselves as descendants of the Huns, but the majority of modern scholars refute this theory.

About the Transylvanian Scythulis, whom we call Székelys – In addition, in its Transylvanian parts, there are the privileged nobles called Scythuli, originating from the Scythian people when they first came to Pannonia, whom we call by a corrupt name: „Székely". They enjoy quite different laws and customs; they are very skilled in warfare; and divide up and distribute inheritances and offices among themselves by tribes and kindreds and the lineages of kindreds, in the manner of the ancients.

— István Werbőczy: Tripartitum

=== Alternative theories ===
Humanist scholar Petrus Ransanus was the first to propose an alternative theory about the origin of the Székelys. Based on the Latin Siculus form of their ethnonym, he said that Sicilian soldiers who allegedly fought in the army of Attila the Hun were the Székelys' ancestors. Jesuit priest Ferenc Fasching stated that the Székelys were descended from a Jasz group whom Béla IV of Hungary had supposedly settled in Transylvania. Nicolae Iorga proposed that the Székelys were originally Romanians, but he abandoned this theory.

== Modern scholarship ==
=== 19th and 20th Centuries ===
The linguist Pál Hunfalvy was the first scholar to question the association of the Székelys with the Huns in the 1870s. However, scholars have not reached a consensus about the origin of the Székelys. The modern theories can be divided into three major groups.

==== Late Avars ====
Medieval chronicles are evidence that the Székelys were regarded as a distinct ethnic group which had settled in the Carpathian Basin before the Hungarians. Some scholars (especially Gyula László and Pál Engel) say that the Székelys are the direct descendants of the "Late Avar" population of the region. The "Late Avar" period started around 700 A.D., and lasted for about a century. Artifacts (mostly buckles and strap ends) decorated with floral patterns and griffins are the most featured items of the assemblages for this period. László and Engel attribute this new archaeological horizon to a group of Onogurs who had fled from the Pontic steppes to the West after the Khazars destroyed their empire around 680. According to most scholars, the Onogurs spoke a Turkic language, but László proposed that they were a Hungarian-speaking group. A charter of Louis the German, King of East Francia, mentioned the Wangariorum marcas ("Wangars' frontier") around 860, implying that Onogurs still lived in the westernmost region of the Carpathian Basin in the second half of the 9th century. Most scholars refute the association of the Székelys with the "Late Avars" or Onogurs.

==== Associated people ====
According to a widely accepted scholarly theory, the Székelys had originally been a Turkic people who joined the Magyars in the Pontic steppes (to the east of the Carpathian Basin). Written sources evidence, the Székelys were regarded a separate ethnic group in the Middle Ages. Simon of Kéza wrote of the "Hungarian and Székely forces" of Andrew II of Hungary; a charter of William, Bishop of Transylvania, distinguished the Hungarians and Székelys in 1213. The Székelys were listed along with other peoples in the Middle Ages, also indicating that they were considered an ethnic group. In 1250, a royal charter enumerated the Saxons, Vlachs, Székelys and Pechenegs when mentioning a campaign against Bulgaria; the 14th-century Hungarian chronicles wrote of Székelys and Pechenegs participating in the Battle of Olšava.

=== 21st century scholarship ===
==== Social group theory (Hungarian border guards) ====
===== Linguistic background =====
The Székelys speak the Hungarian language "without any trace of a Turkic substratum", indicating that they did not have a language shift during their history, according to scholars, who propose that the Székelys were descended from privileged Hungarian groups. Most place names in Székely Land are of Hungarian origin, showing that the Székelys spoke Hungarian when they settled in the region. The three main Hungarian dialects of Székely Land are closely connected to the Hungarian variants spoken along the western and southwestern borders of the medieval Kingdom of Hungary. The dialect of the Székelys of Marosszék is similar to the dialects spoken by the Hungarian communities near Pressburg (now Bratislava in Slovakia) and in southern Burgenland. The Hungarian variant of Udvarhelyszék is closely related to the tongue of the Hungarians in Baranya County and Slavonia. The easternmost Székely communities' dialect is connected to the Hungarian variant of Burgenland.

===== Archival materials =====
Other important social phenomenon supports the social group thesis. If Székely men moved to the cities or towns in Székelyland, they lost their Székely social status and identity immediately, moreover the new townsmen and the Székely villagers considered each other as extraneous. It also confirms that Székelys considered themselves as a special privileged Hungarian social group rather than a real separate ethnic group in the medieval and early modern period. A very similar social phenomenon and a new strong local identity emerged in Hajdúság region of Hungary in the early modern period, when the Hajdú soldiers got feudal privileges and own territory from prince Stephen Bocskai.

===== Parasocial model =====
According to a new model, the word Székely/Szekler is a social ethnonym that was formed from the Hungarian verb 'szök(ik)' (jump, move fast, escape, run away) using the suffix -l/ly creating deverbal nouns. The original meaning of the word is 'a swift-moving, fugitive, runaway (person).' The formation of the social group began in the 11th century. The process was triggered by the establishment of the landlord system and the frequent wars which led to the escape and 'wandering' of slaves and free people coerced into subordination (see unintended consequences). The refugees mainly settled in the sparsely populated border region and hard-to-reach places (forests, swamps) where the institutional vacuum allowed them to found independent communities. After this process of self-organization, the Hungarian kings reintegrated the Székely groups into the kingdom's society from the beginning of the 12th century. The historical parallels of the process are provided by the ʿApiru, the Cossacks, the Hungarian Hajduk and the Maroon societies.

== Sources ==
=== Primary sources ===
- Anonymus, Notary of King Béla: The Deeds of the Hungarians (Edited, Translated and Annotated by Martyn Rady and László Veszprémy) (2010). In: Rady, Martyn; Veszprémy, László; Bak, János M. (2010); Anonymus and Master Roger; CEU Press; ISBN 978-9639776951.
- Simon of Kéza: The Deeds of the Hungarians (Edited and translated by László Veszprémy and Frank Schaer with a study by Jenő Szűcs) (1999). CEU Press. ISBN 963-9116-31-9.
- Stephen Werbőczy: The Customary Law of the Renowned Kingdom of Hungary in Three Parts (1517) (Edited and translated by János M. Bak, Péter Banyó and Martyn Rady with an introductory study by László Péter) (2005). Charles Schlacks, Jr. Publishers. ISBN 1-884445-40-3.

=== Secondary sources ===
- Benkő, Loránd; Szabó T., Ádám (1985). "Adalékok a székelyek korai történetéhez: Benkő Loránd akadémikussal beszélget Szabó T. Ádám [Data to the early history of the Székelys: Ádám T. Szabó's conversation with Loránd Benkő, Member of the Hungarian Academy of Sciences]". Honismeret (in Hungarian). 5: 22–30.
- Curta, Florin (2006). Southeastern Europe in the Middle Ages, 500-1250. Cambridge University Press. ISBN 978-0-521-89452-4.
- Egyed, Ákos (2013). A székelyek rövid története a megtelepedéstől 1989-ig (in Hungarian). Pallas-Akadémiai Könyvkiadó. ISBN 978-973-665-365-0.
- Engel, Pál (2001). The Realm of St Stephen: A History of Medieval Hungary, 895–1526. I.B. Tauris. ISBN 1-86064-061-3.
- Hermann, Gusztáv Mihály (2004). Székely történeti kistükör [Small Mirror of Székely History] (in Hungarian). Litera. ISBN 973-85950-6-1.
- Kordé, Zoltán (1993). "A székely eredetkérdés az újabb kutatások tükrében [The origin of the Szeklers in the Light of recent Scholarship]". AETAS: Történettudományi folyóirat (in Hungarian). 3: 21–39. ISSN 0237-7934.
- Kristó, Gyula (1996). A székelyek eredetéről [On the Origin of the Székely] (in Hungarian). Szegedi Középkorász Műhely. ISBN 963-482-150-2.
- Makkai, László (1994). "The Emergence of the Estates (1172–1526)". In Köpeczi, Béla; Barta, Gábor; Bóna, István; Makkai, László; Szász, Zoltán; Borus, Judit (eds.). History of Transylvania. Akadémiai Kiadó. pp. 178–243. ISBN 963-05-6703-2.
- Pop, Ioan Aurel (1996). Romanians and Hungarians from the 9th to the 14th Century: The Genesis of the Transylvanian Medieval State. Centrul de Studii Transilvane, Fundaţia Culturală Română. ISBN 973-577-037-7.
