= Blaž Škrinjarić =

- Born: 1520s near Varaždin
- Died: 1592
- Known for: member of the Varaždin literary circle

Blaž Škrinjarić (1520s-1592) was a city notary and judge in Varaždin and a member of the Varaždin literary circle.

== Early life and career ==
Škrinjarić was born in the mid or late 1520s in a place near Varaždin. After he was educated in Habsburg Kingdom of Hungary Škrinjarić first worked as a teacher in a school in Aszalo and later as a rector of a school in Varaždin. He was also a notary and judge in Varaždin. He reached the position of a president of the octaval court.

== Trial ==
In 1588 Škrinjarić was accused of committing adultery with a certain Uršula Geljanić and for being a father of the child she gave birth to three years after her husband died. Škrinjarić was stripped of all judicial privileges and forced to hand over the key and stamp of the city to the new judge. Geljanić was taken to prison but managed to escape. After Škrinjarić was accused for helping her escape he found her and brought her to trial where she swore that she had no relation with him. Based on the court's decision, Geljanić was "put into shackles" in the house of the city guardian to be tortured to confess who was the father of her child. Škrinjarić was released of accusations because he swore innocence, while the fate of the widow Geljanić is unknown.

== Bibliography ==
In 1587 Škrinjarić published his Latin language work De Agno Paschali in the Printing House of Ivan Manlius. A copy of this work can be found in the University Library in Budapest. Škrinjarić dedicated this book to Antun Vramec. The relation between Škrinjarić and Vramec corresponded to the relation between a student and his teacher. Although he published his only work on Latin language and there is no single sentence he wrote using Kajkavian dialect, because of the influence on the other members of the Varaždin literary circle, he is frequently connected with first written Kajkavian works.

== Sources ==
- Jembrih, Alojz (1996). Kajkaviana croatica: hrvatska kajkavska riječ (in Croatian). Braća hrvatskoga zmaja. ISBN 978-953-6040-04-9.
- Mohorovičić, Andre (1983). Varaždinski zbornik: 1181-1981 : zbornik radova sa znanstvenog skupa održanog u Varaždinu od 1. do 3. lisopada 1981. godine povodom obilježavanja 800. godišnjice grada (in Croatian). Jugoslavenska akademija znanosti i umjetnosti.
- Svoboda, Branko (1958). Stare vinogradske kurije i klijeti (in Croatian). Kulturno-prosvjetno društvo Hrvatskih zagoraca "Matija Gubec".
- Maštrović, Tihomil (2001). Zbornik o Branku Vodniku: književnom povjesničaru : zbornik radova sa znanstvenoga skupa Zagreb-Varaždin, 13.-15. travnja 2000 (in Croatian). Hrvatski studiji Sveučilišta u Zagrebu. ISBN 978-953-6682-22-5.
- Jembrih, Alojz (1992). O Vramčevoj Kronici (in Croatian). Kršćanska sadašnjost.
- Bajza, Željko (1 January 1996). Priče ispod Medvednice i Ivančice (in Croatian). Multiart. ISBN 978-953-97062-0-1.
- Vramec, Antun; Klaić, Vjekoslav (1908). Kronika [Chronicle]. Ex officina Societatis Typographicae.
- Vončina, Josip (1991). Korijeni Krležina Kerempuha (in Croatian). Naprijed. ISBN 9788634902280.
- Zvonar, Ivan (2009). Na kajkavskim korijenima: rasprave i studije (in Croatian). Samobor: Meridijani. ISBN 978-953-239-108-4.
