= Entailment (Hungary) =

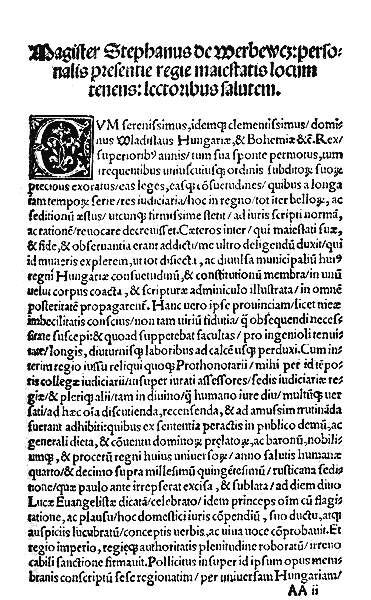
Werbőczy's preface to the first edition of the Tripartitum

Entailment (ius aviticum, Ősiség, Aviticitas) was an act that did not allow the selling of the land rendering it (i.e. the estate) inalienable. This was observed in the Hungarian Kingdom from 1351 (King Louis I) until 1848. Széchenyi's Credit (Hitel,1830), among other things (e.g. Fiscalitas, háramlási jog or escheat), mainly revolved around this.
