= Varaždin literary circle =

The Varaždin literary circle or Croatian-Kajkavian literary circle (Serbo-Croatian: Varaždinski litararni krug; Hrvatskokajkavski književni krug) was a literary group which emerged at the end of the 16th century in Varaždin. The framework of the Varaždin literary circle had four members. One of them was Roman Catholic vicar Antun Vramec, while the other members were writers Ivanuš Pergošić, Blaž Škrinjarić and Blaž Antilović. The arrival of Antun Vramec to Varaždin marked the emergence of the Varaždin literary circle. Some members of this literary circle were the first authors to write or publish texts in the Kajkavian dialect of Croatian.

The forerunner of this literary circle was Protestant preacher Mihajlo Bučić. Some sources include Bučić as a member of this literary circle. The Varaždin literary circle followed the line of contemporary European literary and theological societies. The Varaždin literary circle was careful not to show any sympathies toward Protestant Reformation. In his works, Vramec deliberately used simple language spoken by the population of Slavonia to suppress the books published by Protestants.

== Sources ==
- Leykam (2007). Hrvatska i Slavonija u ranome novom vijeku. Leykam international. ISBN 978-953-7534-01-1.
- JAZU (1998). "Hrvatskokajkavski književni krug i prva tiskara u Varaždinu". Encyclopaedia moderna. Institut za filozofiju znanosti i mir Jugoslaenske akademije znanosti i umjetnosti.
- Mohorovičić, Andre (1983). Varaždinski zbornik: 1181-1981 : zbornik radova sa znanstvenog skupa održanog u Varaždinu od 1. do 3. lisopada 1981. godine povodom obilježavanja 800. godišnjice grada. Jugoslavenska akademija znanosti i umjetnosti.
- Perić, Ivo (1998). A history of the Croats. Center of Technology Transfer. ISBN 978-953-97327-1-2.
- Jembrih, Alojz (1992). O Vramčevoj Kronici. Kršćanska sadašnjost.
- Svoboda, Branko (1958). Stare vinogradske kurije i klijeti. Kulturno-prosvjetno društvo Hrvatskih zagoraca "Matija Gubec,".
- Zvonar, Ivan (2009). Na kajkavskim korijenima: rasprave i studije. Meridijani. ISBN 978-953-239-108-4.
- Vramec, Antun; Klaić, Vjekoslav (1908). Kronika. Ex officina Societatis Typographicae.
