= Jembrih =

Jembrih is a surname of Croatian origin.

== People with the surname ==
- Alojz Jembrih (born 1947), Croatian historian
- Ljubica Jembrih (born 1974), Croatian politician

== See also ==
- Jabrayil
