= Andrija Jambrešić =

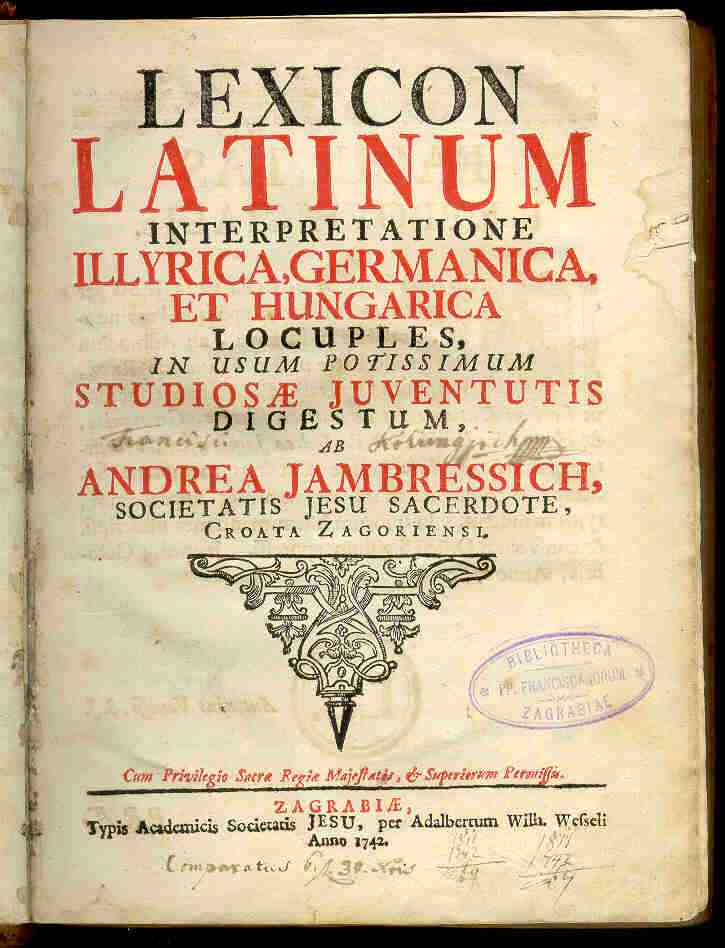
Front page

Andrija Jambrešić (20 September 1706 – 13 May 1758) was a Croatian writer, lexicographer and linguist. He is best known for his dictionary Lexicon Latinum, which he created in collaboration with Franjo Sušnik (1686 – 1739) and published in 1742, Zagreb.

== Biography ==
1887 biography of Andrija Jambrešić by Ivan Milčetić

He was born in Cesarska ves on 20 September 1706. He attended schools in Varaždin and Zagreb, becoming a Jesuit in 1727. Following his studies of philosophy in Trnava, he became a professor at the Zagreb gymnasium, a post he held for a year in 1729. He subsequently became a professor in Varaždin. From 1731 to 1735, he studied theology in Graz, and subsequently enrolled at the Zagreb faculty of philosophy. From this point on, he held various posts, teaching philosophy at Jesuit seminaries. Apart from his most known work, a Croatian dictionary published in 1742, he is also known for his suggestion for Croatian orthography (1732), which was later adopted as a school standard in 1778. Dealing with legal issues, he also wrote a manual dealing with Croatian laws and legal interpretations, Municipale Croatiae jus, commentario illustratum.

== Lexicon latinum ==
The multilingual dictionary, Lexicon Latinum interpretatione Illyrica, Germanica et Hungarica locuples & index illirico sive croatico-latinus represents an important monument in studies of linguistics, lexicography, comparative Slavistics and dialectology. The Croatian counterpart, named Illyrian, is written in the Kajkavian dialect, but with elements of Shtokavian and Chakavian. The linguistic purism is reflected in numerous translated, and newly coined words, particularly in scientific terminology. The dictionary was released only two years after a similar dictionary by Ivan Belostenec was published by the Paulines, which would indicate competition between them and the Jesuits.

== Works ==
- Andrija Jambrešić - Franjo Sušnik: Lexicon Latinum interpretatione Illyrica, Germanica et Hungarica locuples & index illirico sive croatico-latinus, Typis Academicis societatis Jesu, Zagrabiae, 1742.
- Manuductio ad Croaticam orthographiam, 1732 (Introduction to Croatian orthography)
- Municipale Croatiae jus, commentario illustratum

== Bibliography ==
- "O Andriji Jambrešiću" [On Andrija Jambrešić]. Vienac: zabavi i pouci (in Serbo-Croatian). Vol. XIX. 1887-03-05. pp. 158–159, 172–175, 187–190, 206–207, 235–238. Issues 10–13, 15. The continuations were published March 12, 19, 26, and April 9.
- N. Raos, Kemijski pojmovi u Jambrešićevom Lexicon Latinum (1742), Prirodoslovlje 20(1-2) (2020) 59-78.
