= Škrinjarić =

Škrinjarić is a surname. Notable people with the surname include:

- Blaž Škrinjarić (1520s–1592), Croatian notary and judge
- Sunčana Škrinjarić (1931–2004), Croatian writer, poet and journalist
