= Mihajlo Bučić =

- Born: before 1540
- Died: end of 16th century
- Years active: second half of the 16th century

Mihajlo Bučić was a Catholic priest who converted to Protestantism and became its propagandist.

== Career ==
The date and place of Bučić's birth and death are unknown. Bučić was a vicar in Belica and in Međimurje. Until 1565 he was a vicar in Stenjevac but had to move to estate of Juraj IV Zrinski in Nedelišće because of the conflict with Franjo Tahi. In 1574 Juraj Drašković, the bishop of the Roman Catholic Archdiocese of Zagreb, strictly followed recommendations of the Council of Trent and expelled Bučić from Catholic church under accusations that his book was heretic propaganda of Protestantism. Drašković also ordered burning of Bučićs books and publishing of new books to dispute writings of Bučić. It is possible that Postilla authored by Antun Vramec is published in 1586 in Varaždin to follow the orders of Drašković.

Bučić significantly contributed to spreading of Protentantism in the Habsburg Kingdom of Croatia. Because Bučić enjoyed protection of the lord of Međimurje, Juraj IV Zrinski, thanks to whom (and later to his sons) this area was the only significant stronghold of Protestantism in Croatia for 50 years.

== Bibliography ==
Bučić was the forerunner of the Varaždin literary circle and one of the first writers on Kajkavian dialect. Two books he wrote were banned and burned during period of the counter reformation movement so there is no evidence about the language or script he used in them. Still, it is assumed that he wrote his works on Kajkavian dialect and also on Latin language. According to some sources Bučić published three of his works in Nedelišće. There are disputes if he wrote only on Latin language, or probably on Kajkavian or even Čakavian dialect. The Latin language title of his book he published probably between 6 February 1573 and 6 March 1574 was Contra realem praesentiam Corporis et Sanguinis Christi in sacramento Eucharistiae.

== Sources ==
- Leykam (2007). Hrvatska i Slavonija u ranome novom vijeku. Leykam international. ISBN 978-953-7534-01-1.
- SDS (1980). Slavistična revija. Slavistično Društvo Slovenije.
- Бабић, Владимир (1960). Историја народа Југославије. Просвета.
- Črnja, Zvane (1962). Cultural History of Croatia. Office of Information.
- Бранковић, Томислав (2006). Протестантске заједнице у Југославији, 1945-1991: друштвени и политички аспекти деловања. Јунир. ISBN 978-86-83745-54-8.
- Poljanec, Franjo (1940). Istorija srpskohrvatskog i slovenačkog književnog jezika: s pregledom naših dijalekata i istorijskom čitankom : za više razrede srednjih škola. Izdanje Kreditne i pripomoćne zadruge profesorskog društva.
- Bojničić, Ivan; Laszowski, Emilije (1900). Vjestnik Kr. hrvatsko-slavonsko-dalmatinskog zemaljskog arkiva. Tisak Kralj. zemaljske tiskare.
- Kulundžić, Zvonimir (1977). Ta rič hrvacka, starinska, naša, draga ... ča zvoni kroz stolića: rasprave iz starije hrvatske književnosti od Marulića do Matuša. Kulundžić.
- Jembrih, Alojz; Bratulić, Josip (1989). Hrvatski biografski leksikon: Bj-C. Leksikografski zavod Miroslav Krleža. ISBN 978-953-6036-18-9.
