= Juraj Ratkaj =

Croatian historian (1612–1666)

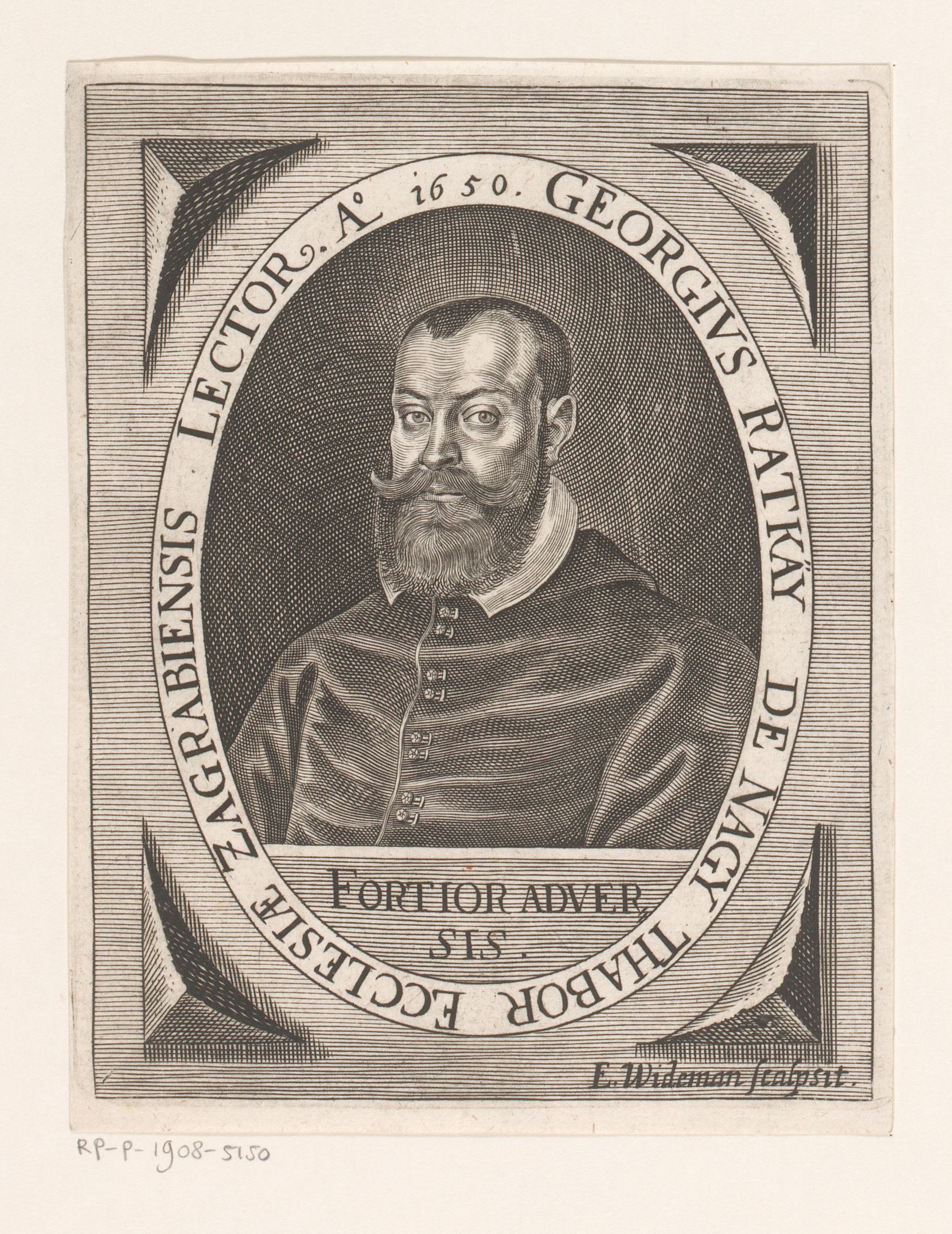
- Born: 22 December 1612; Veliki Tabor, Kingdom of Croatia, Habsburg monarchy
- Died: 9 January 1666 (aged 53); Zagreb, Kingdom of Croatia, Habsburg monarchy
- Other name: Juraj Rattkay
- Occupations: historian, priest and nobleman

Juraj Ratkaj (also known as Juraj Rattkay, born in Veliki Tabor, on December 22, 1612 — Zagreb, on September 1, 1666) was a Croatian historian, priest and nobleman. Born in the Ratkaj Croatian noble family, barons of Veliki Tabor, he was a member of the Society of Jesus. Later on he became a priest and the canon of Zagreb. He took part in the Thirty Years' War in 1647 and fought the Ottomans as well. His best known work is Memoria regum et banorum regnorum Dalmatiae, Croatiae et Sclavoniae (Memory of the kings and bans of the kingdoms of Dalmatia, Croatia and Slavonia).

== Biography ==
He was born on December 22, 1612, to Peter Ratkaj and Barbara Erdödy. He began as a member of the Jesuit Order (1632-1639), then as a priest, and finally as Canon of Zagreb from 1642. He was a participant in the wars against the Ottoman Empire (1641, 1648), and in the Thirty Years' War. He was a close friend and associate of Ban of Croatia Ivan III Drašković, as well as other nobles and dignitaries. His best known work Memoria regum et banorum Regnorim Dalmatiae, Croatiae et Sclavoniae was published in Vienna in 1652, representing the first historiographical work of the Croatian lands. He died in Zagreb in 1666.
