= Mijo Lončarić =

Croatian linguist (1941–2023)

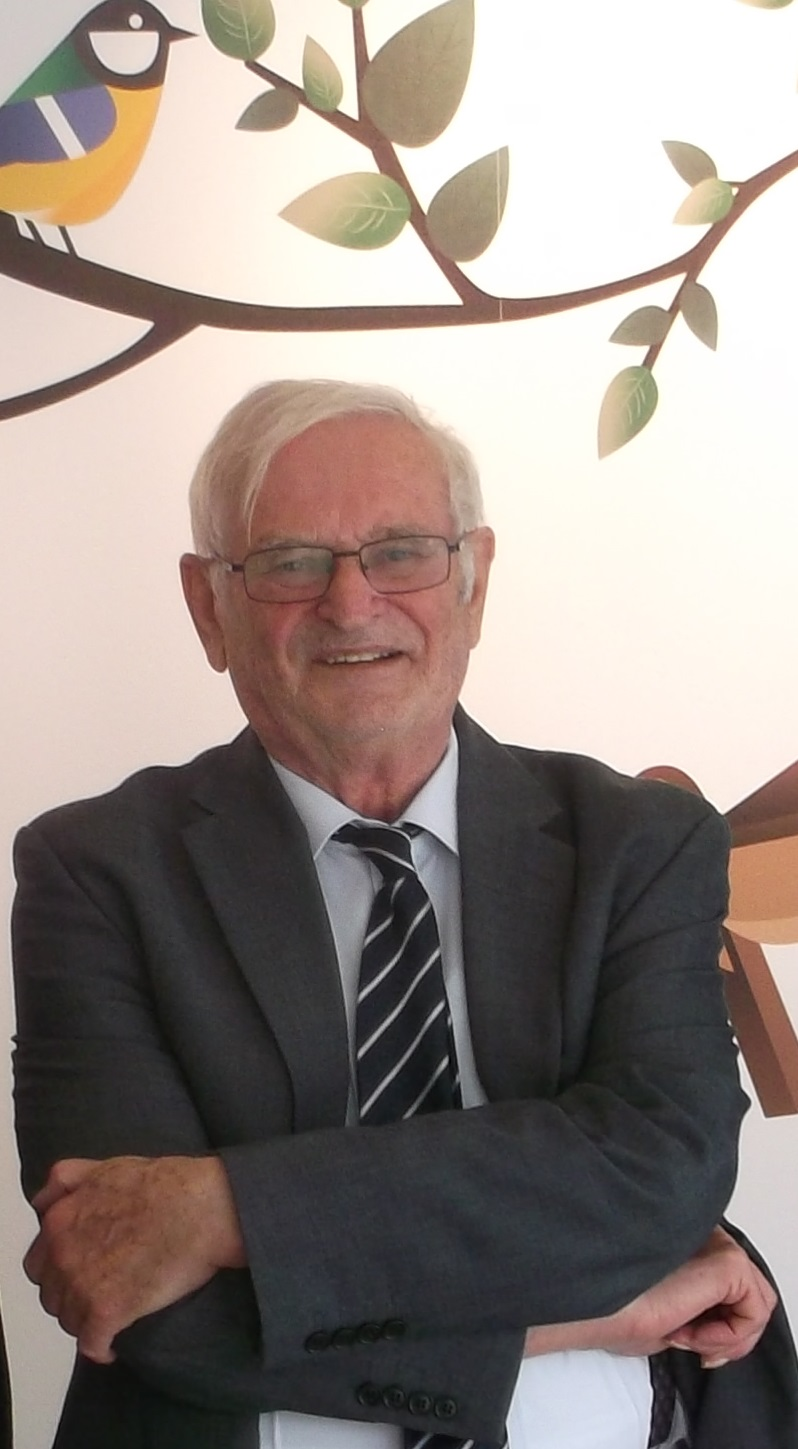
Lončarić in 2018

Mijo Lončarić (1 September 1941 – 21 June 2023) was a Croatian linguist.

== Life and career ==
Mijo Lončarić was born in Reka, Croatia. He received a degree in Yugoslav languages and literature and German at the Faculty of Humanities and Social Sciences, University of Zagreb in 1966, and a PhD with a thesis on Bilogora Kajkavian speeches (published in 1986). He was the recipient of the Humboldt Foundation scholarship on two occasions. After lecturing at various foreign universities in 1973 he started working at the Institute of Croatian Language and Linguistics, serving as a Director in the period 1993-1995.

Lončarić published numerous dialectological works, especially on Kajkavian dialect (Kaj jučer i danas, 1991; Kajkavsko narječje, 1996), and conducted field research of hundreds of local dialects. He co-authored several grammars and dictionaries (Hrvatska gramatika, Rječnik hrvatskoga kajkavskoga književnog jezika, Gradišćanskohrvatsko-hrvatsko-nimški rječnik, Rječnik govora Gole). He was the head of the Croatian linguistic atlas project.

Lončarić died in Zagreb on 21 June 2023, at the age of 81.
