= Velika Horvatska =

- Village
- Location within Croatia
- Coordinates: 46°06′N 15°44′E
- Country: Croatia
- County: Krapina-Zagorje
- Municipality: Desinić

Area
  - Total: 3.5 km^{2} (1.4 sq mi)
- Elevation: 175 m (574 ft)

Population (2021)
  - Total: 234
  - Density: 67/km^{2} (170/sq mi)
- Time zone: UTC+1 (CET)
  - Summer (DST): UTC+2 (CEST)
- Postal Code: 49216
- Area code: 049

Velika Horvatska is a village in Croatia.
