= Kajkavian =

South Slavic supradialect or language

- kajkavščina / kajkavština / kajkavica
- Native to: Croatia
- Ethnicity: Croats
- Language family: Indo-European: Balto-Slavic; Slavic; South Slavic; Western South Slavic; Kajkavian
- Standard forms: Literary Kajkavian

Language codes
- ISO 639-3: kjv (Kaikavian Literary Language)
- Glottolog: kajk1237
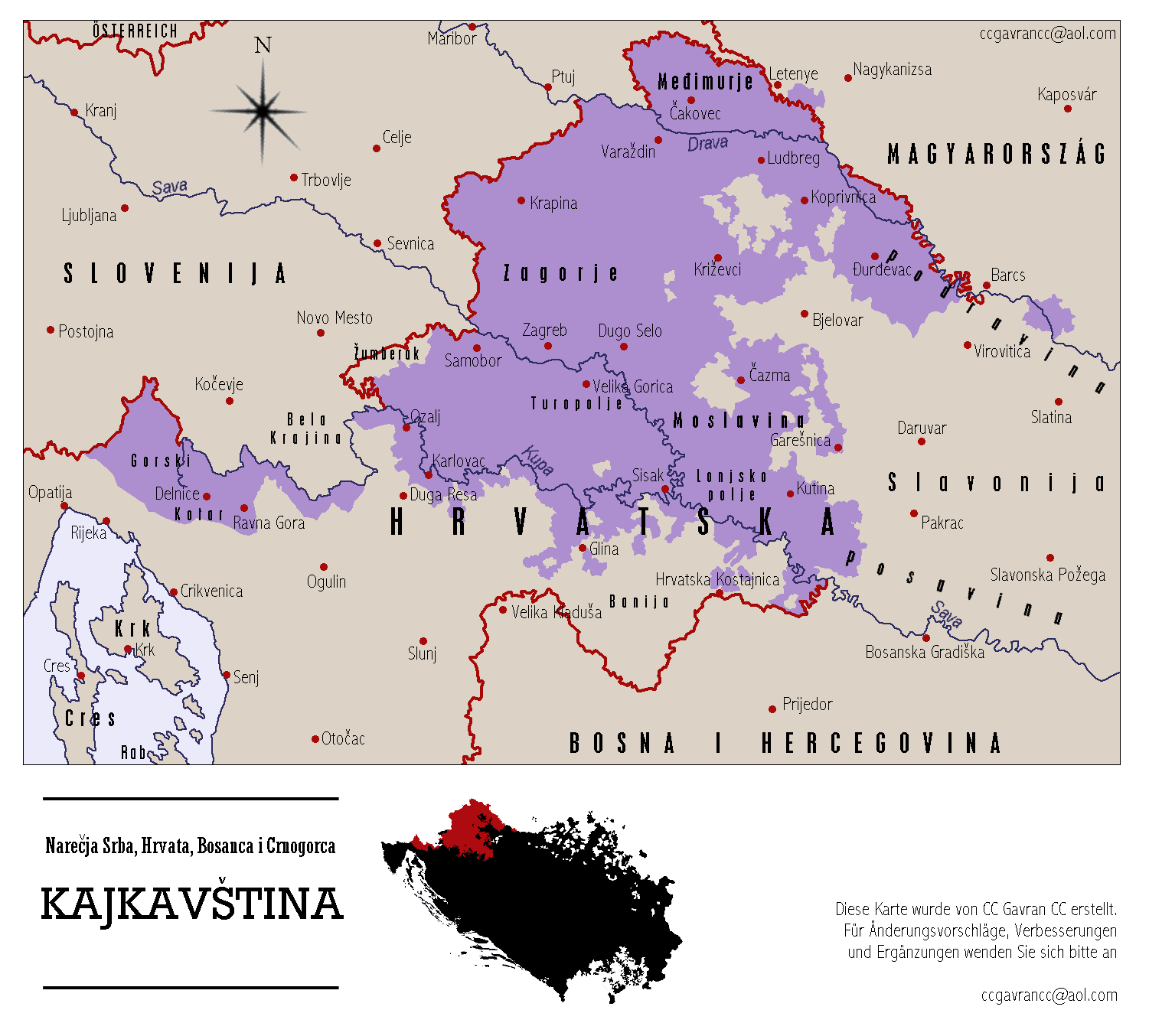
- Kajkavian in Croatia

Kajkavian (Note: Kajkavian is pronounced as /kaɪˈkɑːviən/ and /kaɪˈkæviən/ in English. The native Kajkavian words with which the speakers refer to it are the noun kajkavščina and the adjective kajkavski. The Štokavian adjective for it is also kajkavski, pronounced as [kǎjkaʋskiː], whereas the noun for it is kajkavica or kajkavština, the latter pronounced as [kajkǎːʋʃtina]) is a South Slavic supradialect or language spoken primarily by Croats in much of Central Croatia and Gorski Kotar.

It is part of the South Slavic dialect continuum, being transitional to the supradialects of Čakavian, Štokavian and the Slovene language. There are differing opinions over whether Kajkavian is best considered a dialect of the Serbo-Croatian language or a fully-fledged language of its own, as it is only partially mutually intelligible with either Čakavian or Štokavian and bears more similarities to Slovene; it is transitional to and fully mutually intelligible with Prekmurje Slovene and the dialects in Slovenian Lower Styria's region of Prlekija in terms of phonology and vocabulary.

Outside Croatia's northernmost regions, Kajkavian is also spoken in Austrian Burgenland and a number of enclaves in Hungary along the Austrian and Croatian border and in Romania.

== Name ==
The term "Kajkavian" and the broader classification of what defines this dialect are relatively modern constructs. The dialect's name originates from the interrogative pronoun "kaj" ("what"). The names of the other supradialects of Serbo-Croatian also originate from their respective variants of the interrogative pronoun. The pronouns are just general indicators and not strict identifiers of the dialects. Some Kajkavian dialects use "ča" (common in Čakavian), while certain Čakavian dialects, like the Buzet dialect in Istria, use "kaj". The names of these dialects are based on the most common pronoun used, not an absolute rule.

Autonyms used throughout history by various Kajkavian writers have been manifold, ranging from Slavic (slavonski, slovenski, slovinski) to Croatian (horvatski) or Illyrian (illirski). The naming went through several phases, with the Slavic-based name initially being dominant. Over time, the name Croatian started gaining ground mainly during the 17th century, and by the beginning of the 18th century, it had supplanted the older name Slavic.

The name also followed the same evolution in neighboring Slovene Prekmurje and some other border areas in what is now Slovenia, although there the name Slovene-Croatian (slovensko-horvatski) existed as well. The actual term Kajkavian (kajkavski), including as an adjective, was invented in the 19th century and is credited to Serbian philologist Đuro Daničić, while it was generally used and promoted in the 20th century works by Croatian writer Miroslav Krleža. The term is today accepted by its speakers in Croatia.

In English, Kajkavian is sometimes spelled as Kaykavian, Kaikavian or Caicavian.

== Classification ==
Historically, the classification of Kajkavian has been a subject of much debate regarding both the question of whether it ought to be considered a dialect or a language, as well as the question of what its relation is to neighboring vernaculars.

The problem with classifying Kajkavian within South Slavic stems in part from both its structural differences and close proximity with neighboring Čakavian and Štokavian speeches as well as its historical closeness to Slovene speeches. Some Slavists maintain that when the separation of Western South Slavic speeches happened, they separated into five divergent groups — Slovene, Kajkavian, Čakavian, Western Štokavian and Eastern Štokavian: as a result of this, throughout history Kajkavian has often been categorized differently, either a node categorized together with Serbo-Croatian or Slovene.

Furthermore, there exist few old isoglosses that separate almost all Slovene speeches from all other Western South Slavic dialects, and innovations exist common to Kajkavian, Čakavian, and Western Štokavian that would separate them from Slovene. Croatian linguist Stjepan Ivšić has used Kajkavian vocabulary and accentuation, which significantly differs from that of Štokavian, as evidence for it to be a language in its own right.

Josip Silić, one of the main initiators behind the standardisation of Croatian, also regards Kajkavian as a distinct language by dint of its having significantly different morphology, syntax and phonology from the official Štokavian-based standard. However, Silić's theorization about three languages and systems of Croatian, based on Ferdinand de Saussure and Eugenio Coșeriu concepts, is criticized for being exaggerated, incomprehensible and logically non-existent. According to Ranko Matasović, Kajkavian is equally as Croatian as Čakavian and Štokavian dialects. Mate Kapović notes that the dialects are practical and provisory linguistic inventions which should not be misunderstood and extrapolated outside the context of the dialect continuum.

According to Mijo Lončarić (1988), the formation of the Proto-Kajkavian linguistic and territorial unit would be around the 10th century (when it separated from Southwestern Slavic), until the 12th century it is a separate node of Croatian-Serbian language family (excluding Slovene), between the 13th and 15th century when formed as a dialect with main features known today, until the end of the 17th century when lost a part of spoken territory (to the South, Southeast and especially to East in Slavonia), and from the 17th–18th century till present time when it regained part of its lost territory by forming new transitional dialects.

== Characteristics ==
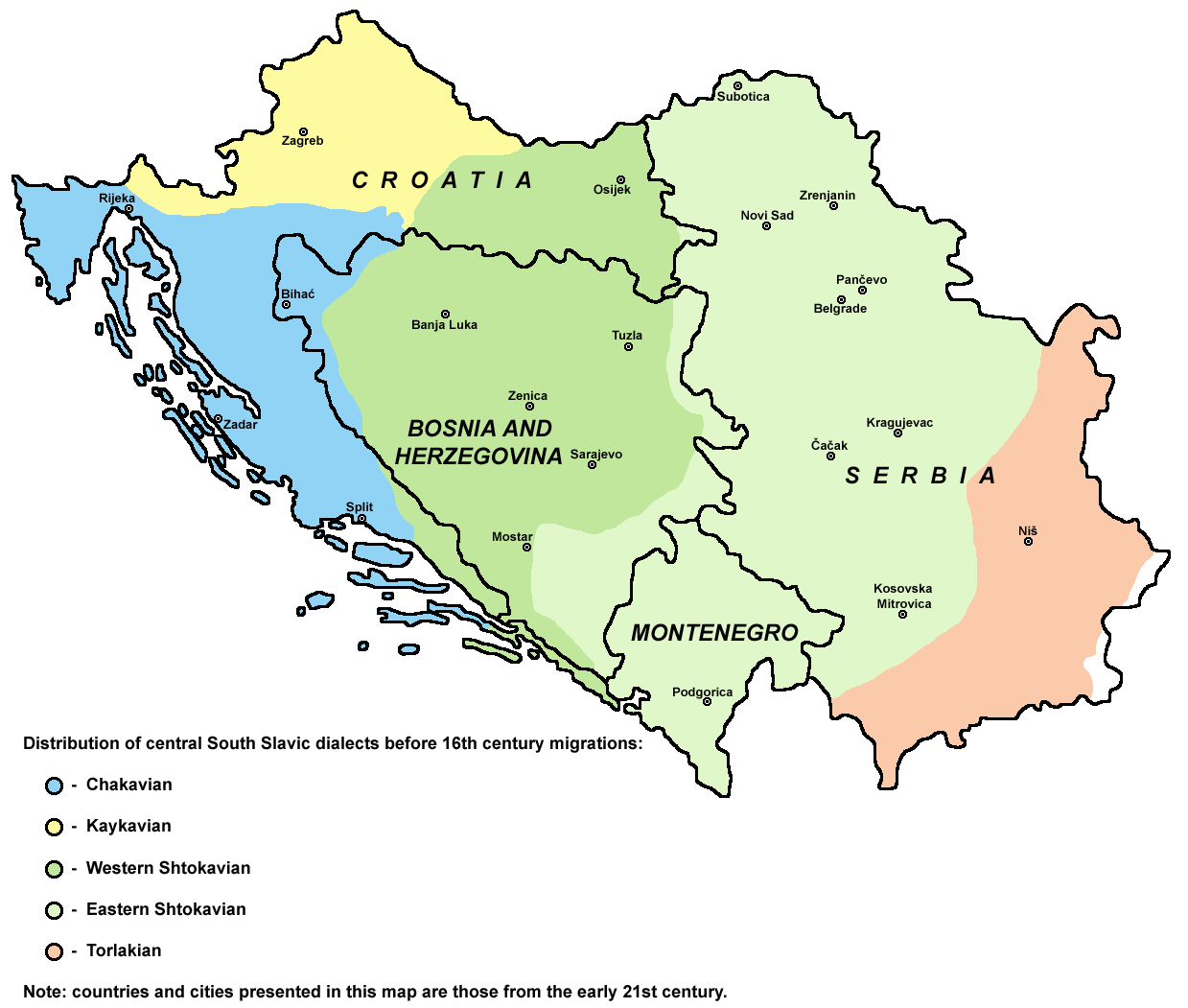
Distribution of Čakavian, Kajkavian and Western Štokavian before 16th century migrations. Kajkavian in yellow.

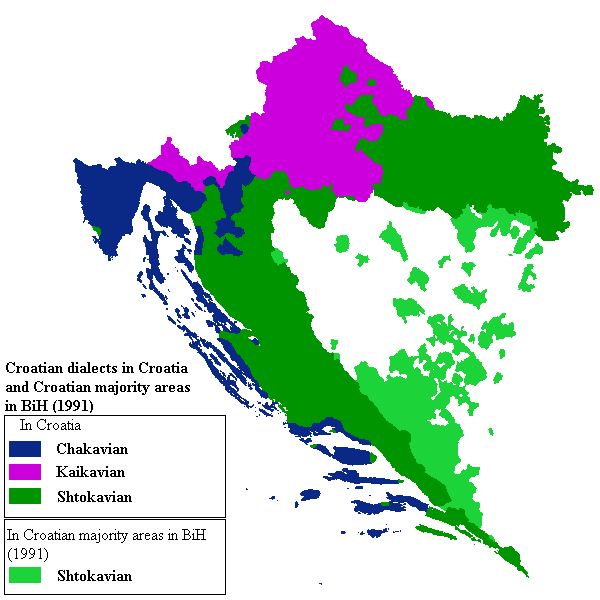
Location map of Serbo-Croatian dialects in Croatia and areas in Bosnia and Herzegovina with Croatian majority. Kajkavian in purple.

The Kajkavian speech area borders in the northwest on the Slovene language and in the northeast on the Hungarian language. In the east and southeast it is bordered by Štokavian dialects roughly along a line that used to serve as the border between Civil Croatia and the Habsburg Military Frontier. Finally, in the southwest, it borders Čakavian along the Kupa and Dobra rivers. It is thought by M. Lončarić that these borders historically extended further to the south and east; for example, the eastern border is thought to have extended at least well into modern-day Slavonia to the area around the town of Pakrac and Slatina, while East of it transitional Kajkavian-Štokavian dialects. The transitional dialects during Ottoman invasion and migrations almost completely vanished.

The Croatian capital, Zagreb, has historically been a Kajkavian-speaking area, and Kajkavian is still in use by its older and (to a lesser extent) by its younger population. Modern Zagreb speech has come under considerable influence from Štokavian. The vast intermingling of Kajkavian and standard Štokavian in Zagreb and its surroundings has led to problems in defining the underlying structure of those speech-groups. As a result, many of the urban speeches (but not rural ones) have been labelled either Kajkavian koine or Kajkavian–Štokavian rather than Kajkavian or Štokavian.

Additionally, the forms of speech in use exhibit significant sociolinguistic variation. Research suggests that younger Zagreb-born speakers of the Kajkavian koine tend to consciously use more Kajkavian features when speaking to older people, showing that such features are still in their linguistic inventory even if not used at all times. However, the Kajkavian koine is distinct from Kajkavian as spoken in non-urban areas, and the mixing of Štokavian and Kajkavian outside of urban settings is much rarer and less developed. The Kajkavian koine has also been named Zagreb Štokavian by some.

As a result of the previously mentioned mixing of dialects, various Kajkavian features and characteristics have found their way into the standard Štokavian (standard Croatian) spoken in those areas. For example, some of the prominent features are the fixed stress-based accentual system without distinctive lengths, the merger of /č/ and /ć/ and of /dž/ and /đ/, vocabulary differences as well as a different place of stress in words. The Zagreb variety of Štokavian is considered by some to enjoy parallel prestige with the prescribed Štokavian variety. Because of that, speakers whose native speech is closer to the standard variety often end up adopting the Zagreb speech for various reasons.

Kajkavian is closely related to Slovene – and to Prekmurje Slovene in particular. Higher amounts of correspondences between the two exist in inflection and vocabulary. The speakers of the Prekmurje dialect are Slovenes and Hungarian Slovenes who belonged to the Archdiocese of Zagreb during the Habsburg era (until 1918). They used Kajkavian as their liturgical language, and by the 18th century, Kajkavian had become the standard language of Prekmurje. Moreover, literary Kajkavian was also used in neighboring Slovene Styria during the 17th and 18th centuries, and in parts of it, education was conducted in Kajkavian.

As a result of various factors, Kajkavian has numerous differences compared to Štokavian:

- Kajkavian has a prothetic v- generalized in front of u (compare Kajkavian vuho, Štokavian uho; Kajkavian vugel, Štokavian ugao; Kajkavian vučil, Štokavian učio). This feature has been attested in Glagolitic texts very early on, already around the 15th century (Petrisov zbornik, 1468). A similar feature exists in colloquial Czech, as well as in many Slovene dialects, especially from the Pannonian, Styrian and Littoral dialect groups.
- Proto-Slavic *dj resulted in Kajkavian j as opposed to Štokavian đ (cf. Kajkavian meja, Štokavian međa, Slovene meja).
- The nasal *ǫ has evolved into a closed /o/ in Kajkavian (cf. Kajkavian roka, Štokavian ruka, Slovene roka).
- Common Slavic *v and *v- survived as v in Kajkavian, whereas in Štokavian they resulted in u and u-, and in Čakavian they gave way to va. The same feature is maintained in most Slovene dialects.
- Kajkavian has retained /č/ in front of /r/ (cf. Kajkavian črn, črv, Štokavian crn, crv, Slovene črn, črv).
- Kajkavian /ž/ in front of a vowel turns into /r/. A similar evolution happened in Slovene, Čakavian as well as Western Štokavian, however the latter does not use it in its standard form (cf. Kajkavian moči > morem/moreš/more, Štokavian moći > mogu/možeš/može, Slovene moči > morem/moreš/more).
- Kajkavian retains -jt and -jd clusters (cf. Kajkavian pojti, pojdem, Štokavian poći, pođem). This feature is shared by standard Slovene.
- Like most Slavic varieties (including Slovenian, but not Štokavian), Kajkavian exhibits final-obstruent devoicing, however it is not consistently spelled out (cf. Kajkavian vrak, Štokavian vrag)
- Diminutive suffixes in Kajkavian are -ek, -ec, -eko, -eco (cf. Kajkavian pes > pesek, Štokavian pas > psić). The same diminutive suffixes are found in Slovene.
- Negative past-tense construction in Kajkavian deviates syntactically from neighboring speeches in its placing of the negative particle. Some argued that this might indicate a remnant of the Pannonian Slavic system. Similar behavior occurs in Slovak (compare Kajkavian ja sem nę čul, Slovene jaz nisem čul, Štokavian ja nisam čuo).
- Some variants of Kajkavian have a different first-person plural present-tense suffix, -mę (cf. Kajkavian -mę, rečemę, Slovene -mo, rečemo, Štokavian -mo, kažemo, Slovak -me, povieme) such as the Bednja dialect, although most Kajkavian sub-dialects retain the suffix -mo.
- Relative pronouns differ from neighboring dialects and languages (although they are similar to Slovene). Kajkavian uses kateri, tęri and šteri depending on sub-dialect (cf. Czech který, Slovak ktorý, Štokavian koji, standard Slovene kateri, Carniolan dialects k'teri, kęri).
- The genitive plural in Štokavian adds an -a to the end, whereas Kajkavian retains the old form (cf. Kajkavian vuk, vukov/vukof, Štokavian vuk, vukova, Slovene volk, volkov; Kajkavian žene, žen, Štokavian žene, žena, Slovene žene, žen/žena).
- Kajkavian retains the older locative plural (compare Kajkavian prsti, prsteh, Štokavian prsti, prstima, Slovene prsti, prstih).
- The loss of the dual is considered to be significantly more recent than in Štokavian.
- Kajkavian has no vocative case. This feature is shared with standard Slovene and most Slovene dialects.
- So-called s-type nouns have been retained as a separate declension class in Kajkavian contrasted from the neuter due to the formant -es- in oblique cases. The same is true for Slovene (compare Kajkavian čudo, čudesa, Štokavian čudo, čuda, Slovene čudo, čudesa).
- Kajkavian has no aorist. The same is true for Slovene.
- The supine has been retained as distinctive from infinitive, as in Slovene. The infinitive suffixes are -ti, -či whereas their supine counterparts are -t, -č. The supine and the infinitive are often stressed differently. The supine is used with verbs of motion.
- The future tense is formed with the auxiliary biti and the -l participle as in standard Slovene and similar to Czech and Slovak (compare Kajkavian išel bom, Štokavian ići ću, standard Slovene šel bom, eastern Slovene dialects išel bom).
- Modern urban Kajkavian speeches tend to have stress as the only significant prosodic feature as opposed to the Štokavian four-tone system.
- Kajkavian exhibits various syntactic influences from German.
- The Slavic prefix u- has a vi- reflex in some dialects, similar to Czech vý- (compare Kajkavian vigled, Czech výhled, Štokavian izgled). This feature sets Kajkavian apart from Slovene, which shares the prefix iz- with Štokavian.

In addition to the above list of characteristics that set Kajkavian apart from Štokavian, research suggests possible a closer relation with Kajkavian and the Slovak language, especially with the Central Slovak dialects upon which standard Slovak is based. As modern-day Hungary used to be populated by Slavic-speaking peoples prior to the arrival of Hungarians, there have been hypotheses on possible common innovations of future West and South Slavic speakers of that area. Kajkavian is the most prominent of the South Slavic speeches in sharing the most features that could potentially be common Pannonian innovations.

Some Kajkavian words bear a closer resemblance to other Slavic languages such as Russian than they do to Štokavian or Čakavian. For instance gda (also seen as shorter "da") seems to be at first glance unrelated to kada, however when compared to Russian когда, Slovene kdaj, or Prekmurje Slovene gda, kda, the relationship becomes apparent. Kajkavian kak (how) and tak (so) are exactly like their Russian cognates and Prekmurje Slovene compared to Štokavian, Čakavian, and standard Slovene kako and tako. (This vowel loss occurred in most other Slavic languages; Štokavian is a notable exception, whereas the same feature in Macedonian is probably not due to Serbo-Croatian influence because the word is preserved in the same form in Bulgarian, to which Macedonian is much more closely related than to Serbo-Croatian).

== Phonology ==
The number of vowels and consonants can vary by region, but the typical Kajkavian phoneme set includes 7 vowels and 23 consonants.

=== Vowels ===
| | Front | Central | Back |
|---|---|---|---|
| Close | i | | u |
| Close-mid | e | | o |
| Open-mid | ɛ | | ɔ |
| Open | | a | |

=== Consonants ===
| | | Labial | Alveolar | Postalveolar | Palatal | Velar |
|---|---|---|---|---|---|---|
| Nasal | | m | n | | ɲ | |
| Plosive | voiceless | p | t | | | k |
| Plosive | voiced | b | d | | | ɡ |
| Affricate | voiceless | | t͡s | t͡ʃ | | |
| Affricate | voiced | | | d͡ʒ | | |
| Fricative | voiceless | f | s | ʃ | | x |
| Fricative | voiced | v | z | ʒ | | |
| Approximant | | | | | j | |
| Lateral approximant | | | l | | ʎ | |
| Trill | | | r | | | |

In most cases, voiced consonants are devoiced at the end of words, unless followed by a word beginning with a vowel or voiced consonant. For example, the words grob (grave), poleg (next to, alongside), and njegov (his) become grop, polek, and njegof respectively.

== History of research ==
Linguistic investigation began during the 19th century, although the research itself often ended in non-linguistic or outdated conclusions. Since that was the age of national revivals across Europe as well as the South Slavic lands, the research was steered by national narratives. Within that framework, Slovene philologists such as Franz Miklosich and Jernej Kopitar attempted to reinforce the idea of Slovene and Kajkavian unity and asserted that Kajkavian speakers are Slovenes. On the other hand, Josef Dobrovský also claimed linguistic and national unity between the two groups but under the Croatian ethnonym.

The first modern dialectal investigations of Kajkavian started at the end of the 19th century. The Ukrainian philologist A. M. Lukjanenko wrote the first comprehensive monograph on Kajkavian (titled Кайкавское нарѣчiе (Kajkavskoe narečie) meaning The Kajkavian dialect) in Russian in 1905. Kajkavian dialects have been classified along various criteria; for instance, Serbian philologist Aleksandar Belić (1927) divided the Kajkavian dialect according to the reflexes of Proto-Slavic phonemes /tj/ and /dj/ into three subdialects: eastern, northwestern and southwestern. However, later investigations did not corroborate Belić's division.

Contemporary Kajkavian dialectology begins with Croatian philologist Stjepan Ivšić's work "Jezik Hrvata kajkavaca" (The Language of Kajkavian Croats, 1936), which highlighted accentual characteristics. Due to the great diversity within Kajkavian primarily in phonetics, phonology, and morphology, the Kajkavian dialect atlas features a large number of subdialects: from four identified by Ivšić to six proposed by Croatian linguist Brozović (formerly the accepted division), all the way up to fifteen according to a monograph by Croatian linguist Mijo Lončarić (1995). The traditional division in six sub-dialects includes: zagorsko-međimurski, križevačko-podravski, turopoljsko-posavski, prigorski (transitional to Central Čakavian), donjosutlanski (migratory transitional Čakavian-ikavian which became Kajkavian), and goranski (also transitional which is more Kajkavian in lesser Eastern part, while more Slovene in main Western part). Kajkavian categorization of transitional dialects, like for example of prigorski, is provisory.

== Area of use ==
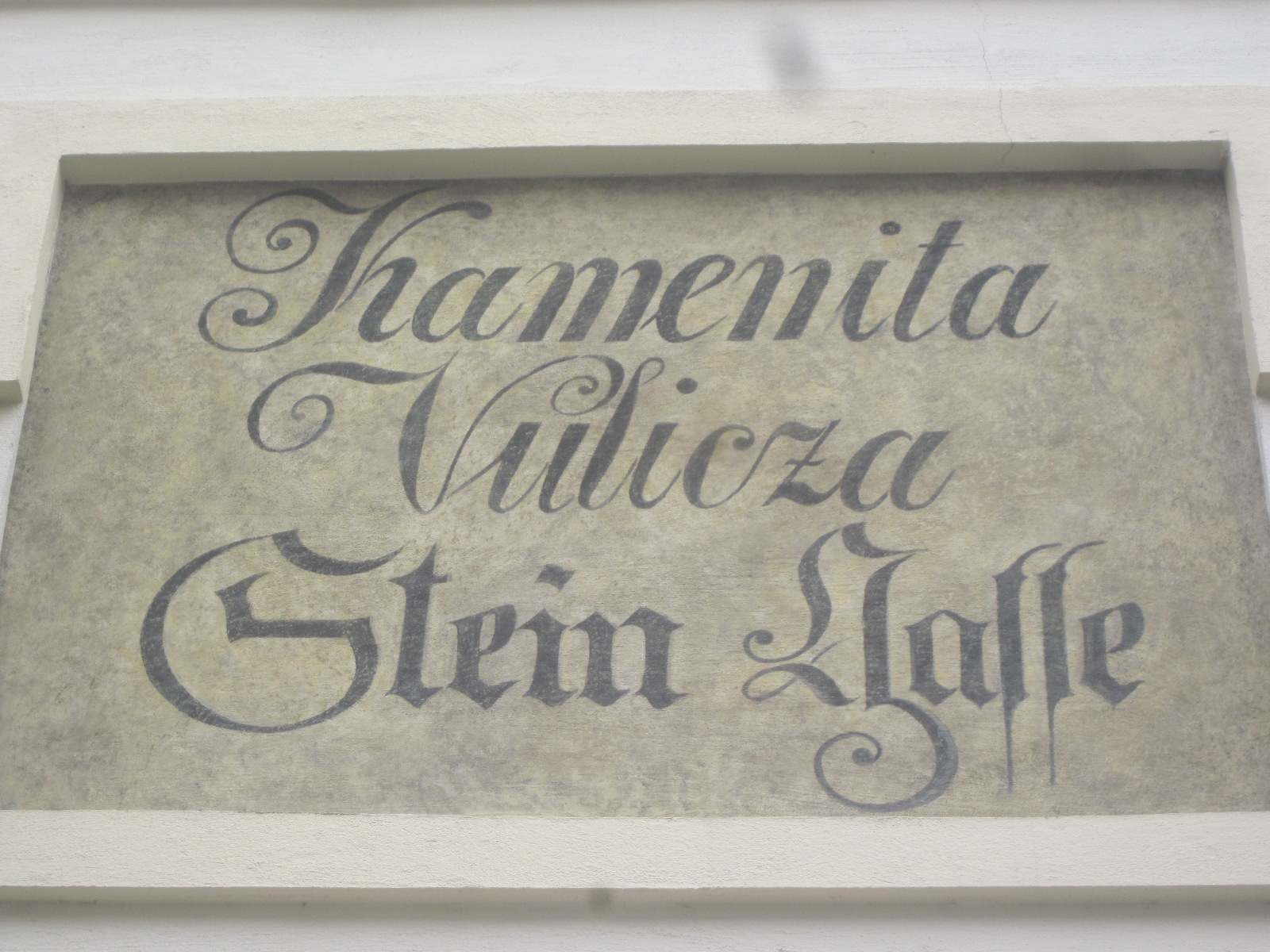
Bilingual Kajkavian/German street sign in Zagreb: Kamenita Vulicza / Stein Gasse

Kajkavian is mainly spoken in northern and northwestern Croatia. The mixed half-Kajkavian towns along the eastern and southern edge of the Kajkavian-speaking area are Pitomača, Čazma, Kutina, Popovača, Sunja, Petrinja, Martinska Ves, Ozalj, Ogulin, Fužine, and Čabar, including newer Štokavian enclaves of Bjelovar, Sisak, Glina, Donja Dubrava and Novi Zagreb. The southernmost Kajkavian villages are Krapje at Jasenovac; and Pavušek, Dvorišče and Hrvatsko selo in Zrinska Gora.

The major cities in northern Croatia are located in what was historically a Kajkavian-speaking area, mainly Zagreb, Koprivnica, Krapina, Križevci, Varaždin, and Čakovec. The typical archaic Kajkavian is today spoken mainly in Hrvatsko Zagorje hills and Međimurje plain, and in adjacent areas of northwestern Croatia where immigrants and the Štokavian standard had much less influence. Many of northern Croatian urban areas today are partly Štokavianized due to the influence of the standard language and immigration of Štokavian speakers. Other southeastern people who immigrate to Zagreb from Štokavian territories often pick up rare elements of Kajkavian in order to assimilate, notably the pronoun "kaj" instead of "što" and the extended use of future anterior (futur drugi), but they never adapt well because of alien eastern accents and ignoring Kajkavian-Čakavian archaisms and syntax.

=== Bednja variant ===
The most peculiar Kajkavian dialect (Bednjounski) is spoken in Bednja in northernmost Croatia.

== Literary Kajkavian ==
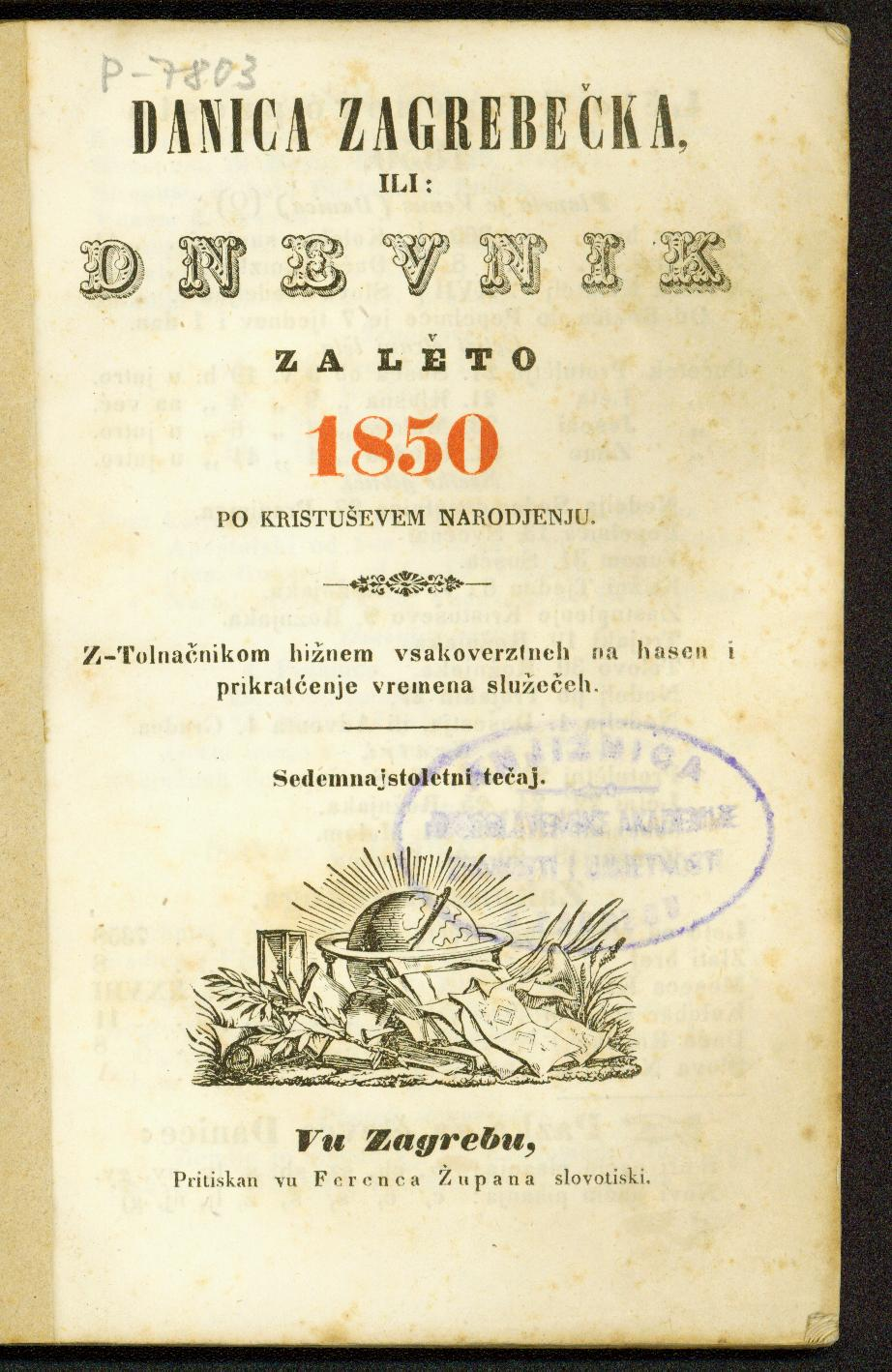
A picture of the 1850 edition of the Kajkavian periodical Danica zagrebečka

Writings that are judged by some as being distinctly Kajkavian can be dated to around the 12th century. The first comprehensive works in Kajkavian started to appear during the 16th century at a time when Central Croatia gained prominence due to the geopolitical environment, since it was free from Ottoman occupation. The most notable work of that era was Ivanuš Pergošić's Decretum, released in 1574. Decretum was a translation of István Werbőczy's Tripartitum.

At the same time, many Protestant writers of the Slovene lands also released their works in Kajkavian in order to reach a wider audience, while also using some Kajkavian features in their native writings. During that time, the autonym used by the writers was usually slovinski (Slavic), horvatski (Croatian) or ilirski (Illyrian).

After that, numerous works appeared in the Kajkavian literary language: chronicles by Vramec, liturgical works by Ratkaj, Habdelić, Mulih; poetry by Ana Katarina Zrinska and Fran Krsto Frankopan, and a dramatic opus by Tituš Brezovački. Kajkavian-based are important lexicographic works like Jambrešić's "Dictionar" (1670), and the monumental (2,000 pages and 50,000 words) Latin-Kajkavian-Latin dictionary "Gazophylacium" (including also some Čakavian and Štokavian words marked as such) by Ivan Belostenec (posthumously, 1740). Miroslav Krleža's poetic work "Balade Petrice Kerempuha" drew heavily on Belostenec's dictionary. Kajkavian grammars include Franz Kornig's in 1795, Josip Matijević's in 1810 and Josip Đurkovečki's in 1837.

During that time, the Kajkavian literary language was the dominant written form in its spoken area along with Latin and German. Until Ljudevit Gaj's attempts to modernize the spelling, Kajkavian was written using Hungarian spelling conventions. Kajkavian began to lose its status during the Croatian National Revival in the mid-19th Century, when the leaders of the Illyrian movement opted to use the Štokavian dialect as the basis for the future South Slavic standard language: the reason being that it had the highest number of speakers. Initially, the choice of Štokavian was accepted even among Slovene intellectuals, but later it fell out of favor.

The Zagreb linguistic school was opposed to the course that the standardization process took. Namely, it had almost completely ignored Kajkavian (and Čakavian) dialects, which was contrary to the original vision of Zagreb school. With the notable exception of the vocabulary influence of Kajkavian on the standard Croatian register (but not the Serbian one), there was very little to no input from other non-Štokavian dialects. Instead, the opposite was done, with some modern-day linguists calling the process of 19th-century standardization an event of "neo-Štokavian purism" and a "purge of non-Štokavian elements".

The early 20th century witnessed a drastic increase in released Kajkavian literature, although by then it had become part of what was considered Croatian dialectal poetry with no pretense of serving as a standard written form. The most notable writers of this period were among others, Antun Gustav Matoš, Miroslav Krleža, Ivan Goran Kovačić, Dragutin Domjanić, and Nikola Pavić.

Kajkavian lexical treasure is being published by the Croatian Academy of Sciences and Arts in Rječnik hrvatskoga kajkavskoga književnoga jezika ("Dictionary of the Croatian Kajkavian Literary Language", 8 volumes, 1999).

Later, Dario Vid Balog, actor, linguist and writer translated the New Testament in Kajkavian.

In 2018, the Kajkavian translation of Antoine de Saint-Exupéry's The Little Prince (Le Petit Prince) was published by Kajkavsko spravišče aka Mali kralevič.

Below are examples of the Lord's Prayer in the Croatian variant of Štokavian, literary Kajkavian, and a Međimurje variant of the Kajkavian dialect.

Standard Croatian

Oče naš, koji jesi na nebesima,
sveti se ime tvoje,
dođi kraljevstvo tvoje,
budi volja tvoja,
kako na nebu tako i na zemlji.
Kruh naš svagdanji daj
nam danas
i otpusti nam duge naše,
kako i mi otpuštamo dužnicima našim,
i ne uvedi nas u napast,
nego izbavi nas od zla.
Amen.

Literary Kajkavian

Otec naš, koj si na nebesi,
sveti se ime tvoje,
dojdi kralestvo tvoje,
budi vola tvoja,
kak na nebu tak i na zemli.
Kruh naš vsagdašni dej
nam denes.
I otpusti nam duge naše,
kak i mi otpuščamo dužnikom našim,
i ne vpelaj nas vu skušavanje,
nego oslobodi nas od zla.
Amen.

Međimurje-Kajkavian

Japek naš ki si v nebesaj,
nek se sveti ime Tvoje,
nek prihaja cesarstvo Tvoje,
nek bo volja Tvoja,
kakti na nebi tak pa na zemlji.
Kruhek naš vsakdaneši daj
nam denes
ter odpuščaj nam duge naše,
kakti i mi odpuščamo dužnikom našim,
ter naj nas vpelati v skušnje,
nek zbavi nas od vsakih hudobah.
Amen.

Standard Slovene

Oče naš, ki si v nebesih,
posvečeno bodi tvoje ime,
pridi k nam tvoje kraljestvo,
zgodi se tvoja volja
kakor v nebesih tako na zemlji.
Daj nam danes naš vsakdanji kruh
in odpusti nam naše dolge,
kakor tudi mi odpuščamo svojim dolžnikom,
in ne vpelji nas v skušnjavo,
temveč reši nas hudega.
Amen.

== Vocabulary comparison table ==
Kajkavian shares similarities in both vocabulary and pronunciation with Slovene and Croatian Štokavian. The following is a comparison of some words in Kajkavian, Prekmurje Slovene, Standard Slovene and Standard Croatian (Štokavian), along with their English translations. The Kajkavian and Prekmurje Slovene vocabulary is drawn from various regions.

| Kajkavian | Prekmurje Slovene | Standard Slovene | Standard Croatian | English |
|---|---|---|---|---|
| kȁj, kȅj | kȁ | kāj | štȍ | what |
| (k)tȅri, štȅri kȍji, ki | štẹ́ri, ki | katẹ̄ri, ki | kòjī | which |
| rẹ̑č | rẹ̑jč | besẹ̑da | rijȇč | word |
| vȅč | vȅč | vȅč | vȉšē | more |
| povẹ̃dati | povẹ́(j)dati | povẹ́dati | kázati | to say, to tell |
| (g)dȏ, štȍ | štȍ(j) | kdọ̄ | tkȍ | who |
| nigdȃr, nȉgda | nigdȃr | nikọ̑li, nȋkdar | nȉkad(a) | never |
| (v)sȅ | vsé | vsȅ | svȅ | everything, all |
| ĩti | ìti | īti | ìći | to go |
| otĩti, odĩti | odíti | odíti | òtīći | to leave, to go |
| tjẽdẹn | tjȅden, kȅden | tẹ̑den | tjȅdan | week |
| krumpẹ̑r, krampẹ̑r | krùmpiš | krompīr | krùmpīr | potato |
| vlẹ̃či | vlẹ́jči | vlẹ́či | vȗći | to tug, to drag |
| kȁjti, ȁr | ár | ker | jȅr | because |
| dẹ̃te | dẹ́(j)te | otrȍk | dijéte | child |
| metepȕh, metúlj | metǘl | metúlj | lȅptīr | butterfly |
| lẹ̏to | lẹ̏to | lẹ́to | gȍdina | year |
| imȁti, imẹ̏ti | imẹ̏ti | imẹ́ti | ìmati | to have |
| vȇkši | vẹ̑kši | vẹ̑čji | vȅćī | bigger, larger |
| bȍl(j)ši | bòlši | bọ̑ljši | bȍljī | better |
| razmẹ̏ti, rȁzmeti | ràzmiti | razumẹ́ti | razùmjeti | to understand |
| zdȉgnuti | zdȉgnoti | dvígniti | dȉgnuti | to lift, to raise |
| č(l)õvek | člȍvek | člóvek | čȍvjek | human, man |
| iskȁti | ìskati | iskáti | trážiti | to search, to look for |
| (h)ȋža | (h)ȋža | híša | kȕća | house |
| dȅžđ, dȅšč, gȍdina | dȅšč | dȅž | kȉša | rain |
| õbẹd | òbed, òbid | kosílo | rúčak, òbjed | lunch, meal |
| jạ̑ sem | gȅ(s) san | jȁz sem | jȃ sam | I am |
| dẹ̏lati | dẹ̏lati | dẹ́lati | ráditi | to work, to do |
| dẹ̏nes, dȅnes | gn(j)ȅs | dánes | dànas | today |
| vrȅ | žȅ | žẹ̑ | vȅć | already |
| ȕfati se | vǜpati | ȗpati | nàdati se | to hope |
| igrȁti | ìgrati | igráti | svírati | to play (an instrument) |
| Vȕzem | Vǜzen | Velíka nȏč | Ùskrs | Easter |

== Kajkavian media ==
During the Yugoslavia period in the 20th century, Kajkavian was mostly restricted to private communication, poetry and folklore. With the regional democratizing and cultural revival beginning in the 1990s, Kajkavian partly regained its former half-public position, chiefly in Zagorje and Varaždin Counties and local towns, where there is now some public media, such as:

- A quarterly periodical "Kaj", with 35 annual volumes in nearly a hundred fascicles published since 1967 by the Kajkavian Association (Kajkavsko Spravišče) in Zagreb.
- An autumnal week of Kajkavian culture in Krapina since 1997, with professional symposia on Kajkavian resulting in five published proceedings.
- An annual periodical, Hrvatski sjever (Croatian North), with a dozen volumes partly in Kajkavian published by Matica Hrvatska in Čakovec.
- A permanent radio program in Kajkavian, Kajkavian Radio in Krapina. Other minor half-Kajkavian media with temporary Kajkavian contents include local television in Varaždin, the local radio program Sljeme in Zagreb, and some local newspapers in northwestern Croatia in Varaždin, Čakovec, Samobor, etc.

== See also ==
- Dialects of Serbo-Croatian
- Slovene dialects
- South Slavic languages

== Bibliography ==
- Feletar D., Ledić G., Šir A.: Kajkaviana Croatica (Hrvatska kajkavska riječ). Muzej Međimurja, 37 pp., Čakovec 1997.
- Fureš R., Jembrih A. (ured.): Kajkavski u povijesnom i sadašnjem obzorju (zbornik skupova Krapina 2002–2006). Hrvatska udruga Muži zagorskog srca, 587 pp. Zabok 2006.
- JAZU / HAZU: Rječnik hrvatskoga kajkavskog književnog jezika (A – P), I – X. Zavod za hrvatski jezik i jezikoslovlje 2500 pp., Zagreb 1984–2005.
- Lipljin, T. 2002: Rječnik varaždinskoga kajkavskog govora. Garestin, Varaždin, 1284 pp. (2. prošireno izdanje u tisku 2008.)
- Lončarić M. 1996: Kajkavsko narječje. Školska knjiga, Zagreb, 198 pp.
- Lončarić M., Željko J., Horvat J., Hanzir Š., Jakolić B. 2015: Rječnik kajkavske donjosutlanske ikavice. Institute of Croatian Language and Linguistics, 578 pp.
- Magner, F. 1971: Kajkavian Koiné. Symbolae in Honorem Georgii Y. Shevelov, Munich.
- Moguš, M.: A History of the Croatian Language, NZ Globus, Zagreb 1995
- Šojat, A. 1969–1971: Kratki navuk jezičnice horvatske (Jezik stare kajkavske književnosti). Kaj 1969: 3–4, 5, 7–8, 10, 12; Kaj 1970: 2, 3–4, 10; Kaj 1971: 10, 11. Kajkavsko spravišče, Zagreb.
- Okuka, M. 2008: Srpski dijalekti. SKD Prosvjeta, Zagreb, 7 pp.
- Levinson, David; O'Leary, Timothy (1992), Encyclopedia of World Cultures, G.K. Hall, p. 239, ISBN 0-8161-1808-6
- Kapović, Mate (2015). Povijest hrvatske akcentuacije. Fonetika [History of Croatian Accentuation. Phonetics] (in Croatian). Zagreb: Matica hrvatska. ISBN 978-953-150-971-8.
- Lončarić, Mijo (1985). "Kajkavsko narječje u svjetlu dosadašnjih proučavanja". Rasprave. 10–11 (1): 281–295.
- Lončarić, Mijo (1988). "Rani razvitak kajkavštine" [Early development of Kajkavian]. Rasprave (in Croatian). 14 (1): 92–99.
- Lončarić, Mijo (1994). "Kajkavski vokalizam". Rasprave (in Croatian). 20 (1): 115–135.
- Lončarić, Mijo (1995). "Prostiranje kajkavštine u prošlosti". Rasprave (in Croatian). 21 (1): 79–102.
- Lončarić, Mijo (2017). "Osvrt na prozodijske izoglose u kajkavskome narječju". Hrvatski dijalektološki zbornik (in Croatian). 21: 187–201. doi:10.21857/yk3jwhkgo9.
- Lončarić, Mijo (2021). "Buzetski dijalekt i kajkavština". Kaj (in Croatian). 54 (250) (3–4): 77–84. doi:10.32004/k.54.3-4.3. S2CID 248718149.
- Matasović, Ranko (2008). Poredbenopovijesna gramatika hrvatskoga jezika [Comparative Historical Grammar of The Croatian Language] (in Croatian). Zagreb: Matica hrvatska. ISBN 978-953-150-840-7.
- Nuorluoto, Juhani (2010). "Central Slovak and Kajkavian Structural Convergences: A Tentative Survey" (PDF). Journal of Slavic Languages and Literatures: 37–45.
- Šekli, Matej (2013). "Zemljepisnojezikoslovna členitev kajkavščine ter slovensko-kajkavska jezikovna meja" [Geographically-linguistic breakdown of Kajkavian and the Slovene-Kajkavian linguistic border] (PDF). Slovenski Jezik / Slovene Linguistic Studies (in Slovenian). 9: 3–53.
