= Alojz Jembrih =

Croatian historian, linguist, philologist

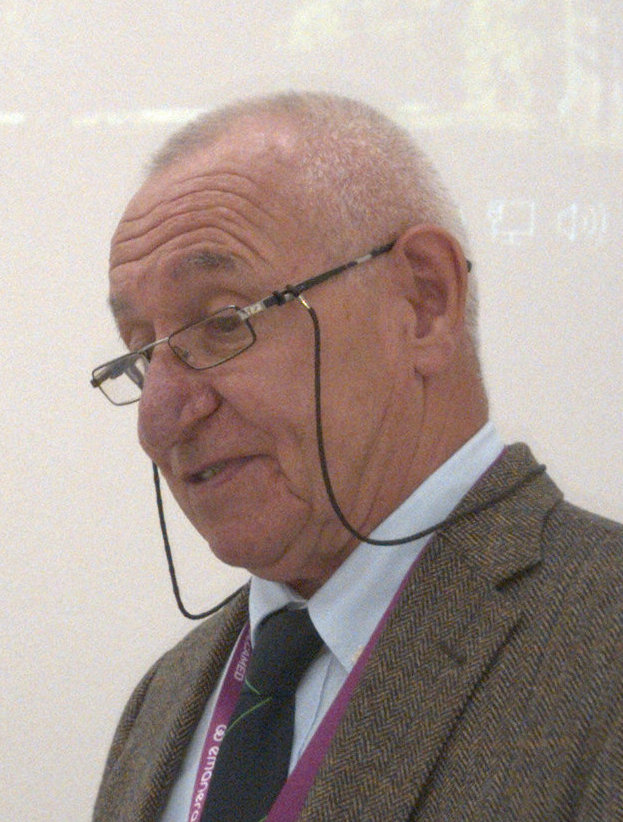
Alojzije Jembrih in 2019.

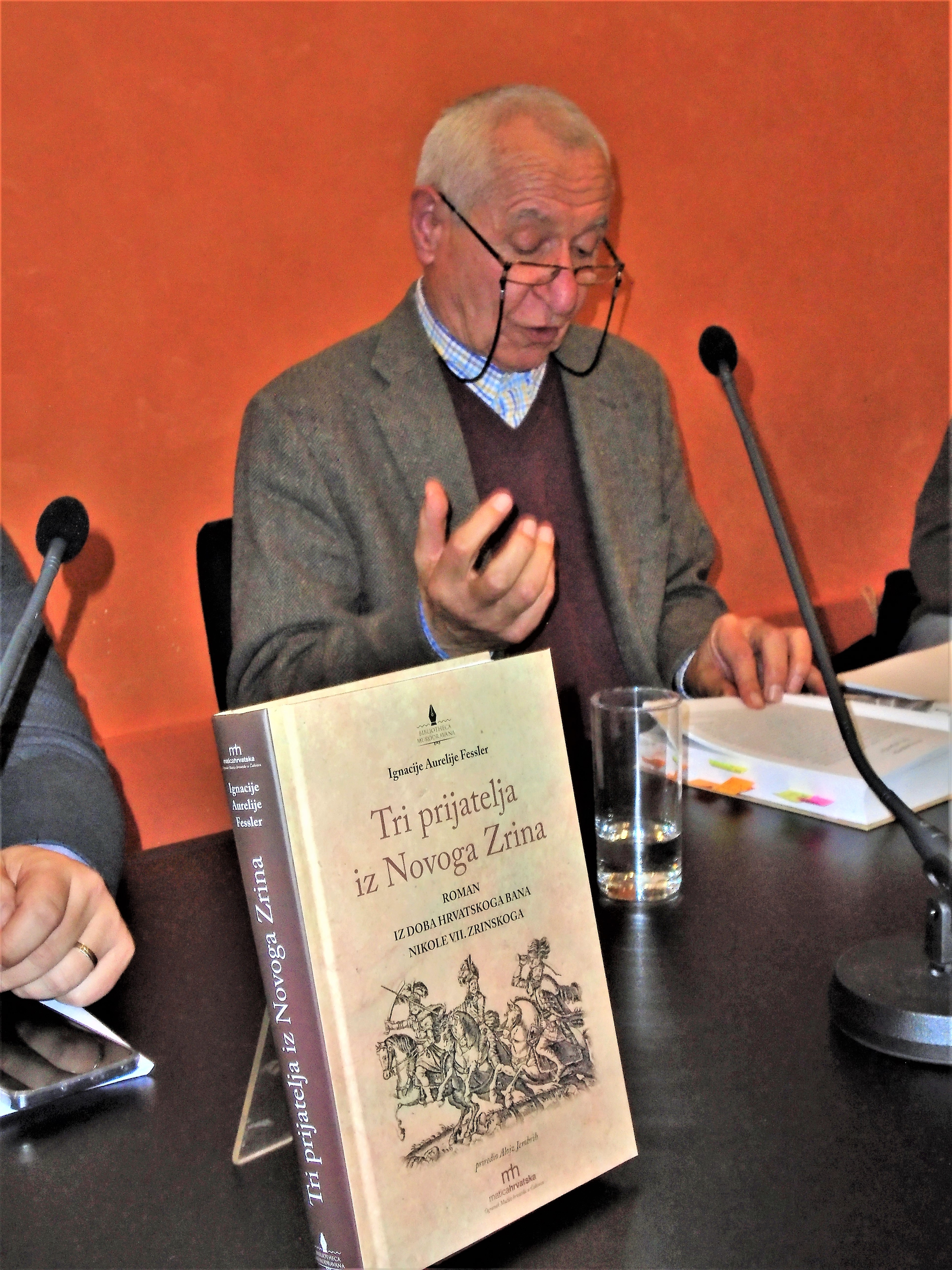
Jembrih in Matica hrvatska 2022.

Alojz (Alojzije) Jembrih (born 11 June 1947) is a Croatian literary historian, linguist, philologist, slavist and expert on Kajkavian literature.

He graduated from the classical high school in Zagreb. In Vienna, he studied Slavic studies, art history and philosophy. In 1977 he finished his PhD thesis about Kajkavian writer Antun Vramec. Between 1978 and 1980 he was associate of the Institute of Old Slavic language in Zagreb. From 1983 until 1996, he taught Slavic Studies at the University of Ljubljana. He taught also Croatian language the Faculty of Teacher Education in Čakovec. Currently he is professor emeritus at Faculty of Croatian Studies at the University of Zagreb.

Alojzije Jembrih's specialization is the Kajkavian literary language and literature. He is a researcher of Croatian Protestant literature from the 16th century. In these area he carried research in Germany between 1986 and 1991.

== Sources ==
- Jembrih, Alojz (in Croatian)

== Literature ==
- Na izvorima hrvatske kajkavske književne riječi, Zrinski, Čakovec 1997 ISBN 953-155-040-9
