= Desinić =

Municipality of Croatia

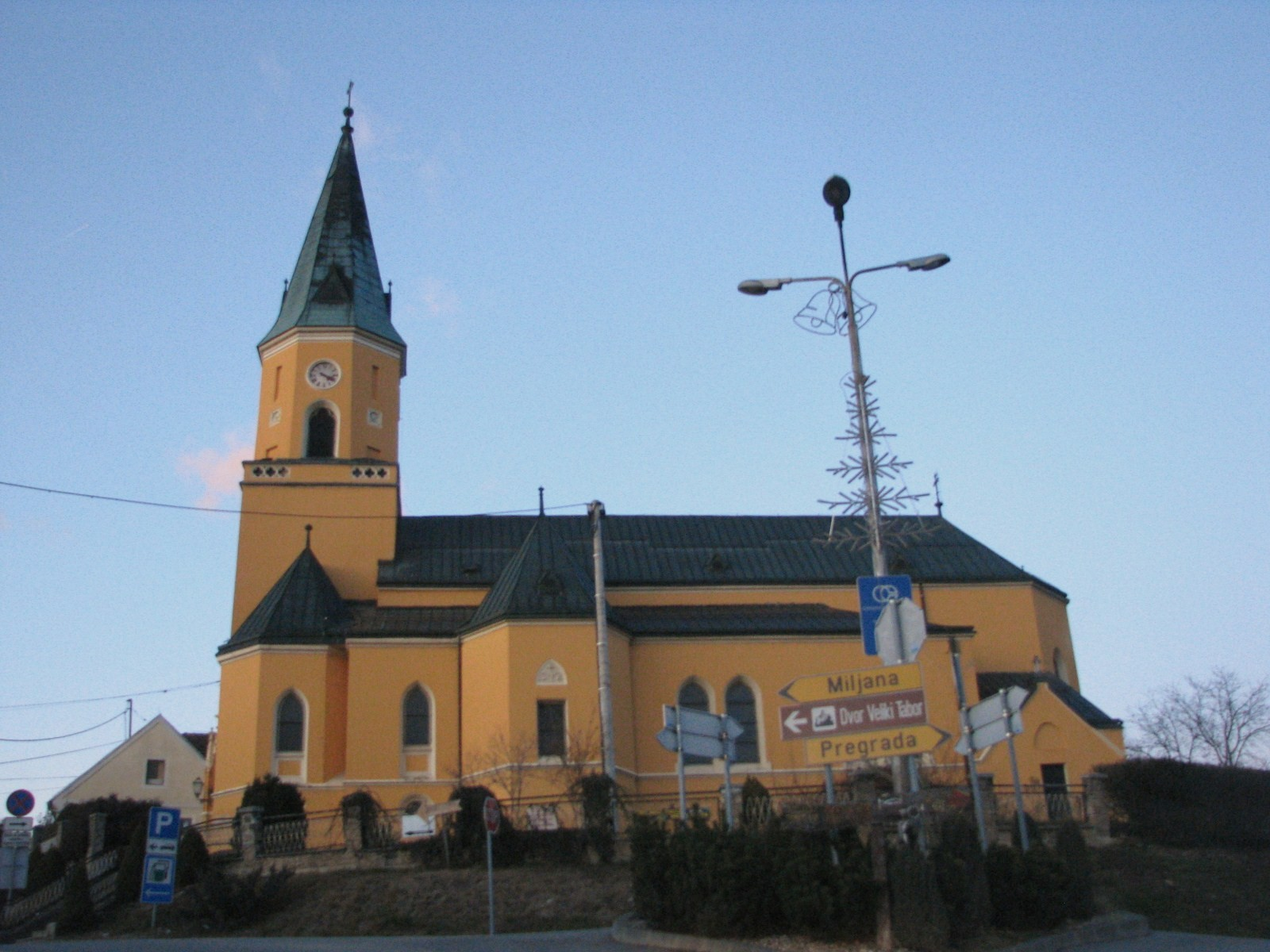
- Saint George Church
- Interactive map of Desinić
- Location within Croatia
- Coordinates: 46°8′24″N 15°39′36″E
- Country: Croatia
- County: Krapina-Zagorje County

Government
  - Mayor: Dražen Šurbek (HDZ)

Area
  - Total: 45.0 km^{2} (17.4 sq mi)

Population (2021)
  - Total: 2,530
  - Density: 56.2/km^{2} (146/sq mi)
- Time zone: UTC+1 (CET)
  - Summer (DST): UTC+2 (CEST)
- Website: desinic.hr

Desinić is a village and municipality in Krapina-Zagorje County in Croatia.

== History ==
Desinić was first mentioned around 1334 in the statutes of the Zagreb Kaptol, under the name “Ecclesia sancti Gheorgii de Zothla” as the seat of the Roman Catholic parish of St. George. In the 15th century, the settlement belonged to the Counts of Celje, until their death.

The first written traces of a population census of the Desinić municipality date back to 1823, from the oldest parish book “Status animarum” during the pastorate of Johanes Sepok and the chaplaincy of Josip Strittoff. Education was introduced only in 1843, introduced by the organist Mihalj Šibl from Zlatar, who became the first teacher in Desinić. From 1869, the teaching service was led by Juraj Prejac, a native of St. Margaret near Ptuj, the father of the better-known Jurica Đuro Prejac. The Desinić municipality began building the school in 1864, and it was expanded in 1865, when classes began. Later, the Desinić municipality took over the patronage of the school, which also paid the teacher, who was supervised by the local parish priest. In 1869, a professional teacher, Juraj Prejac, began working at the school. In 1874, the school was transferred to state patronage, or rather patronage of the provincial government. In 1881, a woman was appointed as a tutor for the first time.

== Demographics ==
In the 2021 census, there was a total population of 2,530, in the following settlements:

- Desinić, population 330
- Desinić Gora, population 98
- Donji Jalšovec, population 43
- Donji Zbilj, population 104
- Dubravica Desinićka, population 41
- Gaber, population 93
- Gora Košnička, population 91
- Gornji Jalšovec, population 64
- Gornji Zbilj, population 48
- Gostenje, population 71
- Grohot, population 15
- Hum Košnički, population 74
- Ivanić Desinićki, population 405
- Ivanić Košnički, population 23
- Jazbina, population 28
- Jelenjak, population 89
- Klanječno, population 26
- Košnica, population 75
- Nebojse, population 67
- Osredek Desinićki, population 34
- Ravnice Desinićke, population 151
- Stara Ves Košnička, population 12
- Šimunci, population 78
- Škalić Zagorski, population 11
- Trnovec Desinićki, population 111
- Turnišće Desinićko, population 98
- Turnovo, population 16
- Velika Horvatska, population 234
Desinić: Population trends 1857–2021
v

population	4644	5466	5990	6324	6695	7656	7057	7442	7282	6835	5778	5145	4469	3808	3478	2933	2530
	1857	1869	1880	1890	1900	1910	1921	1931	1948	1953	1961	1971	1981	1991	2001	2011	2021

Sources: Croatian Bureau of Statistics publications

== Administration ==
The current mayor of Desinić is Dražen Šurbek (HDZ) and the Desinić Municipal Council consists of 13 seats.

Groups	Councilors per group
HDZ	7 / 13
SDP-HSS	6 / 13

== Notable people ==
- Veronika of Desenice, the second wife of Frederick II, Count of Celje, is traditionally believed to have been born in Desinić.
- Gaudencija Šplajt, Roman Catholic nun, social worker and martyr

== See also ==
- Veliki Tabor Castle
