= Aszaló =

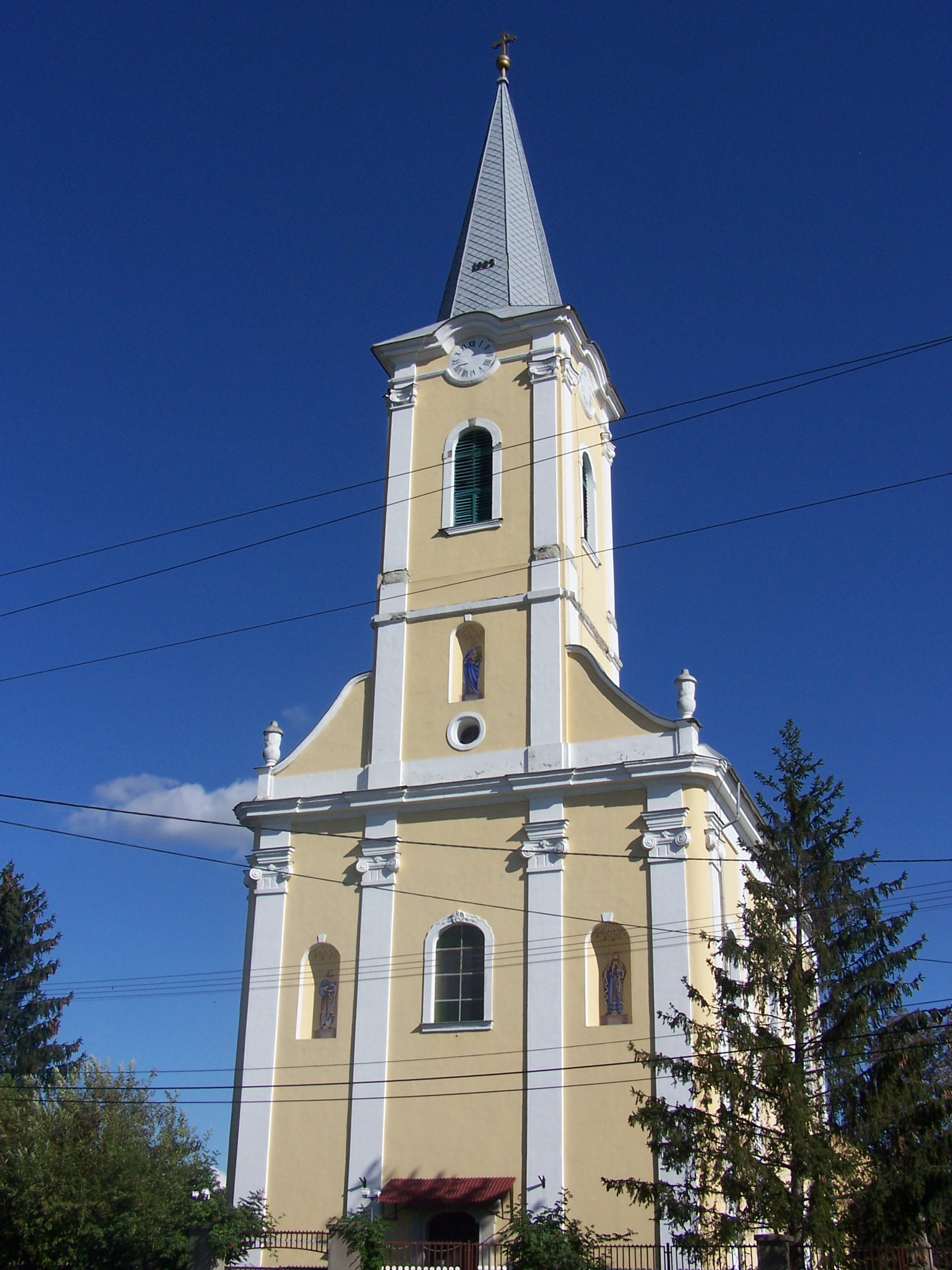

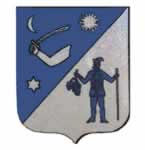
- Coat of arms

- Location of Borsod–Abaúj–Zemplén county in Hungary

- Location of Aszaló
- Coordinates: 48.22122°N 20.96064°E
- Country: Hungary
- County: Borsod–Abaúj–Zemplén

Government
  - Mayor: Dr. Mészáros István

Area
  - Total: 25.36 km^{2} (9.79 sq mi)

Population (2015)
  - Total: 1,843
  - Density: 72.67/km^{2} (188.2/sq mi)
- Time zone: UTC+1 (CET)
  - Summer (DST): UTC+2 (CEST)
- Postal code: 3841
- Area code: 46

Aszaló is a village in Borsod–Abaúj–Zemplén county, Hungary. In 2013, it had 1,860 inhabitants.

== Location ==
It is located 18 km northeast of Miskolc in the centre of Borsod–Abaúj–Zemplén County, on the west bank of the Hornád River which forms outside the eastern border of the village. The river Bársonyos traverses the village from north to south.

Access

It is accessible by public transport by Main Road 3 or by train on the Miskolc-Hidasnémeti railway line.

Surrounding settlements

Csobád (9 km), Halmaj (about 6 km), Kazhmar (9 km), and the nearest town Szikszó (5 km).

== History ==
Its first mention was from 1275 under the name of Ozalou. Already in the Middle Ages, there were significant wine production, and its horses and beekeepers were renowned in the area. In 1553, Ferdinand I plundered it as part of the Little War in Hungary. Throughout history, it has alternatively been part of the counties of Borsod or Abaúj until the two merged after World War II to form Borsod-Abauj-Zemplen. By the second half of the 16th century, there were schools for both boys and girls in Aszaló.

In 1824 and 1854 fires destroyed the majority of the village, but it was rebuilt both times.

In the 19th century a small Jewish community lived in the village, many of whose members were murdered in the Holocaust.

In the 1960s an air defense artillery missile base and a military base were built in the area, but they were closed in the 1980s.

In the 2011 census 80% of the population were Hungarian and 20% were of Romani origin.

== Politics ==
The last local elections were held on 3 October 2010, when the voter turnout was 832 people (59.43%.)

Candidate's name	Party	Votes	Percentage
Károly Árvai	Independent	344	41.95%
Gábor Zsolt Horváth	Fidesz	49	5.98%
Dr. Zoltán Mészáros	Independent	328	40%
József Tóth	Independent	99	12.07%

== Sights ==
- A Late Baroque, Roman Catholic church from the 1770s.
- A Reformed church from the late 18th century.
