= Veliki Tabor Castle =

Renaissance castle in Croatia

Coordinates: 46.154°N 15.651°E

- Veliki tabor (Croatian)
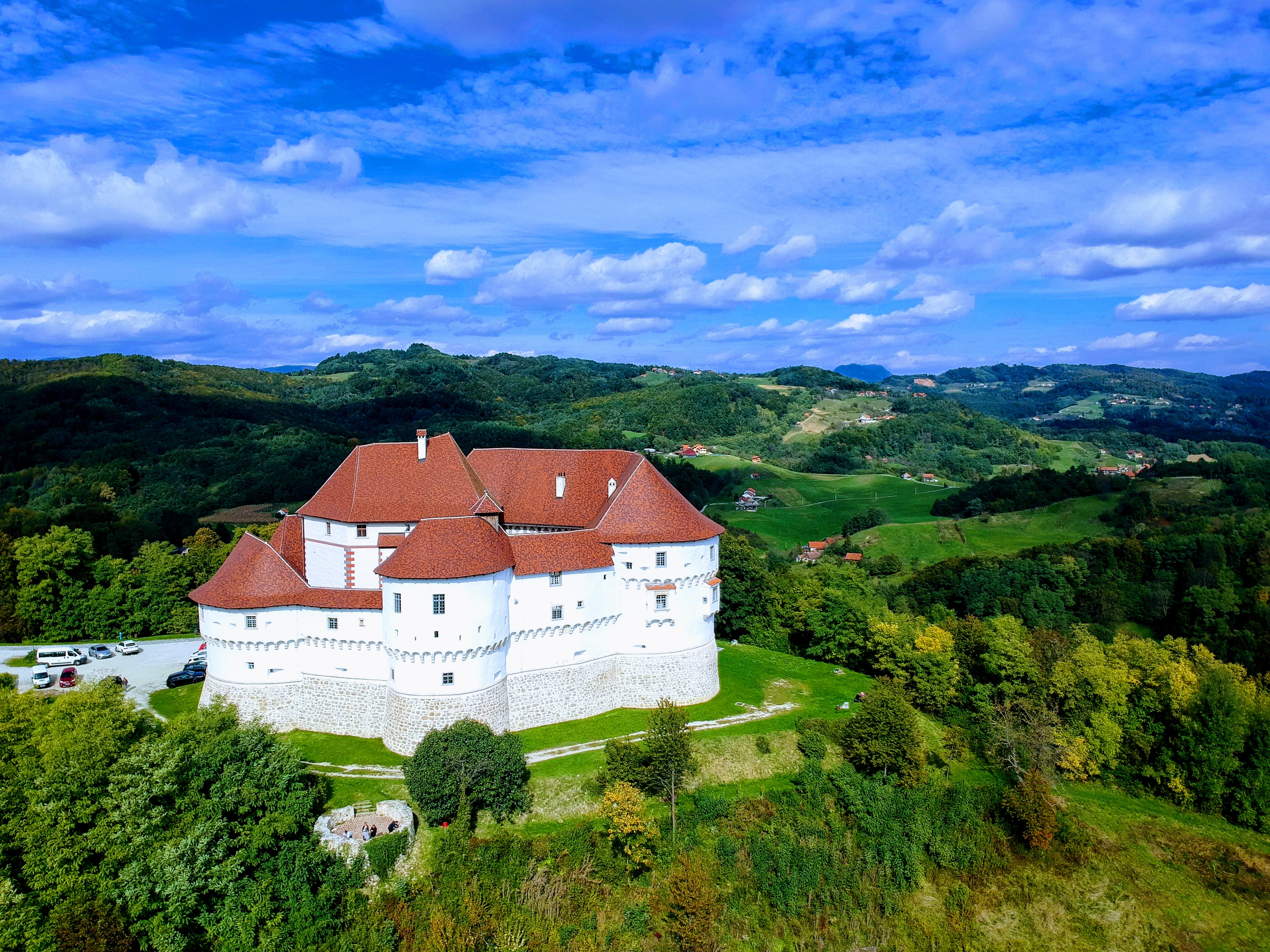
- Aerial image of the castle

- Location within Croatia
- Location: Desinić, Croatia

History
- Built: 15th century

Site notes
- Architectural style: Late gothic Renaissance
- Restored: 2011
- Owner: Counts of Celje Rattkay family Oton Iveković

Cultural Good of Croatia
- Official name: Dvor Veliki Tabor
- Type: Protected cultural good
- Reference no.: Z-3072

Veliki Tabor (Croatian: Great Camp) is a castle and museum in northwest Croatia, dating from the middle of 15th century. The castle's present appearance dates back to the 16th century.

== History ==
Most of the castle was built by the Hungarian noble family of Ráttkay, in whose ownership it remained until 1793.

It is located in the region of Zagorje near Desinić, 8 km (5.0 mi) west of Pregrada, 334 m (1,096 ft) above sea level. It has around 3,340 m^{2} (36,000 sq ft). The castle is owned by the state, which manages it as a museum and a tourist site.

The results of the conservation research and the analysis of the archaeological finds indicate that the oldest part of Veliki Tabor was built in middle of 15th century.

The oldest part of the fort centre is its central part, the pentagonal castle, whose stylistic characteristics belong to the Late Gothic period. The castle is surrounded by four semi-circular Renaissance towers connected by curtain walls and the walls of the northern entrance part. The fort centre is surrounded by the outer defence wall (the distance from the easternmost to the westernmost points being about 225 metres) with a farm office, a Renaissance bastion, two semi-circular guardhouses (northern and southern), and the quadrangular entrance tower (present only on the archaeological level) through which the access road ran.

Since 2002, Veliki Tabor has been the venue of an international festival of short films.

The castle was closed to the public while undergoing renovations beginning 6 November 2008. Those renovations were completed in November 2011.

In the Middle Ages, Veliki Tabor belonged to Hermann II, Count of Celje. His son Fridrik fell in love with Veronika, a girl from a poor family. Hermann refused to accept a minor noblewoman as his daughter-in-law. He accused her of witchcraft and had her drowned. Frederick's rebellion against Hermann ended with Frederick's imprisonment. Her body was apparently walled up in Veliki Tabor.

== In popular culture ==
- In 1975 Yugoslav-Croatian movie Anno Domini 1573 the castle featured Ferenc Tahy's home which gets attacked by his serfs.

== Gallery ==
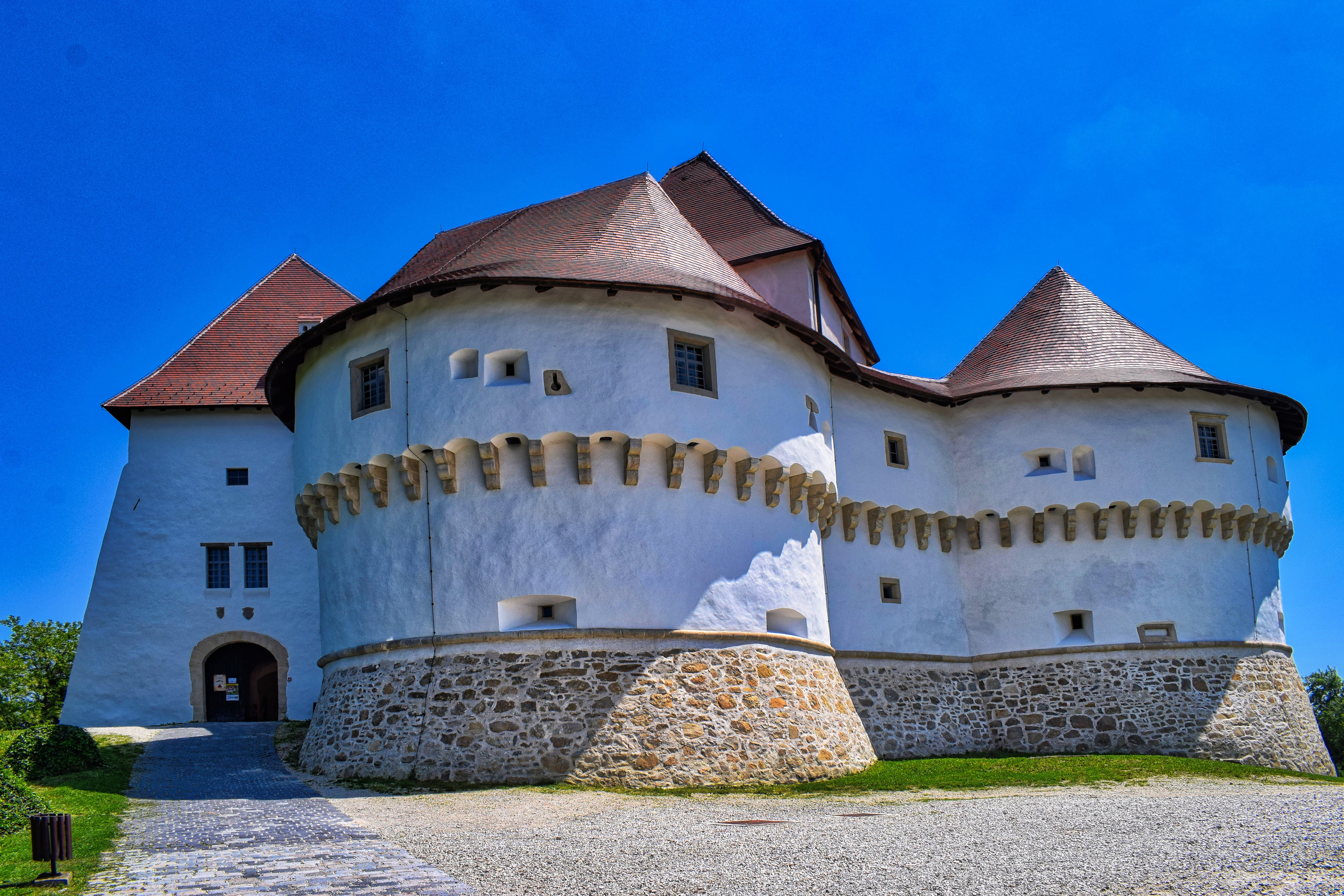
Entrance to the castle.

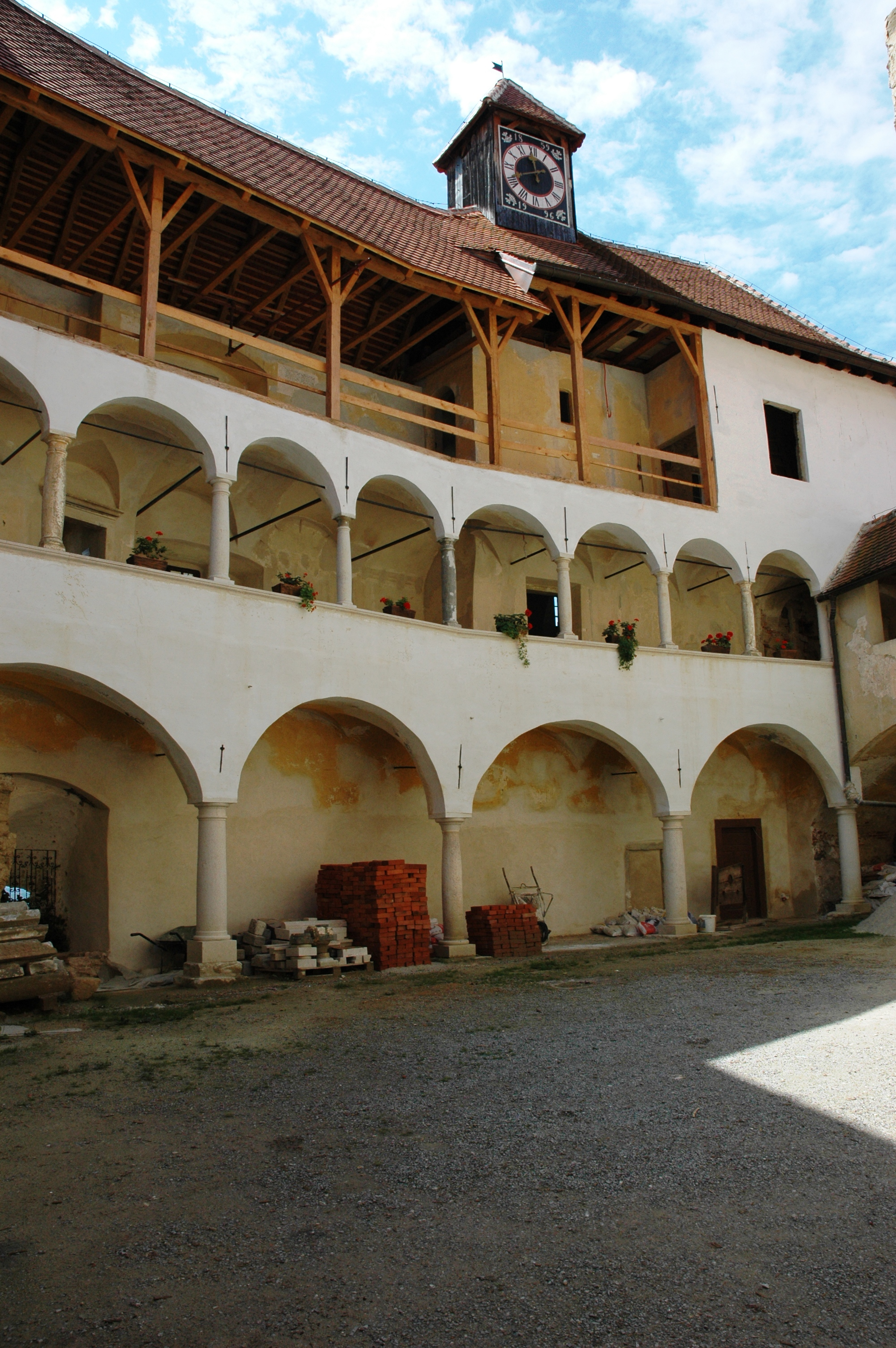
Castle interior

== See also ==
- Tentative list of World Heritage Sites in Croatia
