= Ivan Belostenec =

Croatian linguist and lexicographer

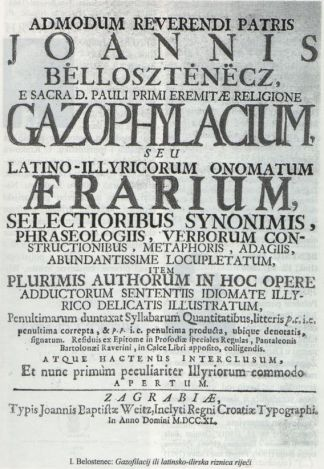
- Gazophylacium
- Born: c. 1594; Varaždin, Kingdom of Hungary
- Died: 2 February 1675 (aged 80–81); Lepoglava
- Occupations: linguist and lexicographer

Ivan Belostenec (c. 1594 – 2 February 1675) was a Croatian linguist, lexicographer and poet.

== Life ==
In 1616 he joined the Paulists. He studied philosophy in Vienna and theology in Rome. Belostenec was a prior of Pauline monasteries in Lepoglava, Svetice at Ozalj and Sveta Jelena at Čakovec, and also a visitator (lat.) in Istria.

== Accomplishments ==
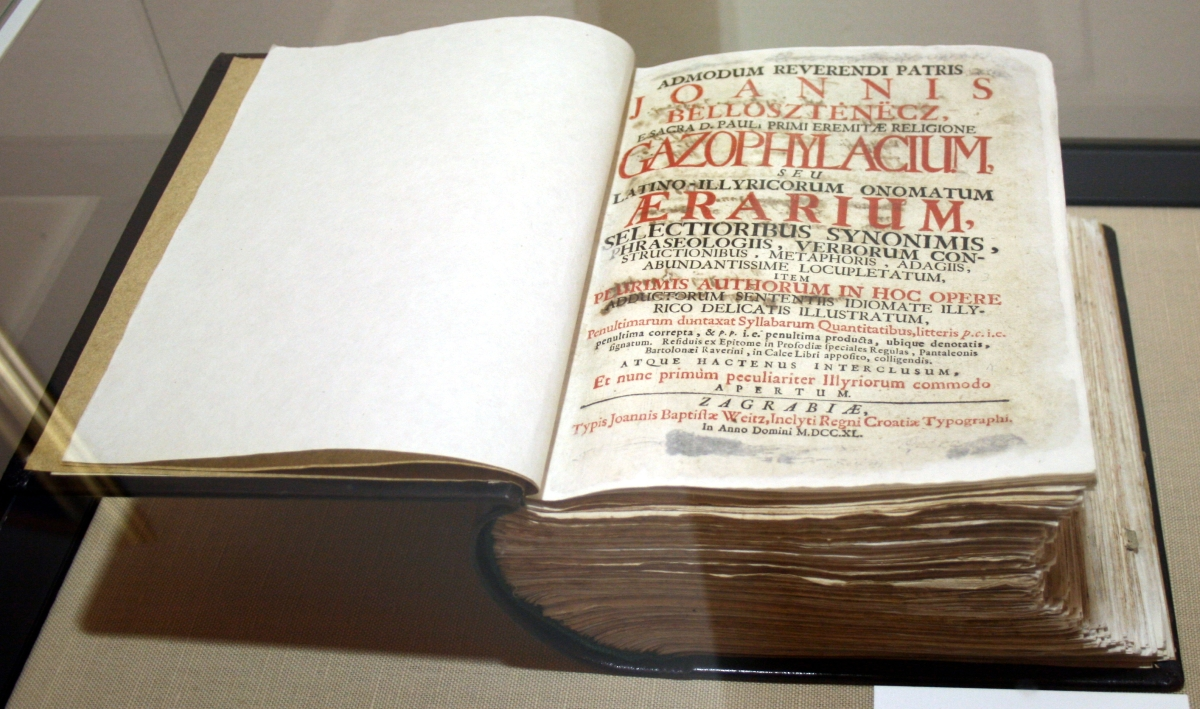
Belostenec's Gazophylacium at the Zagreb City Museum

Belostenec wrote poems (which are lost) and sermons (Ten Commandments About The Eucharist, 1672). His main work was a bilingual dictionary Gazophylacium, seu Latino-illyiricorum onomatum aerarium (Gazophylacium or Illyrian-Latin treasury of words; the other copy of the book has the name Gazophylacium illyrico-latinum). The work remained unfinished. Except for its richness of words, (about 40,000 words on 2,000 pages of text) Gazophylacium is also important for its trilingual concept (kajkavian-chakavian-shtokavian) characteristic for the members of the Ozalj literary-linguistic circle. Gazophylacium was finished and prepared for publication by two Paulists - Jerolim Orlović and Andrija Mužar, it was published in Zagreb 1740.
