= Antun Vramec =

Croatian priest and writer

- Cover page of Kronika
- Born: 1538; Ormož or its vicinity (Duchy of Styria)
- Died: 1587/8; Varaždin, Kingdom of Croatia in the Habsburg Monarchie
- Occupations: a priest and writer
- Known for: being author of the first historical book in Croatian and founder of the Kajkavian literature

Antun (or Anton, also Antol) Vramec (1538–1587/8) was a Croatian priest and writer. He wrote the first historical book in Kajkavian, which was also among the first works of literary Kajkavian.

== Life ==
Vramec was born in Ormož or its vicinity (Duchy of Styria) and died in Varaždin (Kingdom of Croatia). He studied theology in Vienna and in Rome. In 1567, he moved to Zagreb, where he was a canon. In 1571, he became the Archdeacon of Bexen. In 1573, he moved to Varaždin, where he was also the archdeacon. The arrival of Antun Vramec to Varaždin marked the emerging of the Varaždin literary circle to which Vramec belonged.

From 1578 until 1580, he was the parish priest in Brežice, and from 1580 until 1582 the archdeacon in Dubice. In 1582, all his honors were revoked from him, because he did not want to recant his family. Despite his freethinking stance, his connection with the Protestant movement has not been confirmed.

== Work ==
The first work by Vramec was a world chronicle titled Kronika vezda znovich zpravliena Kratka Szlouenzkim iezikom, published in Ljubljana (then known as Laibach) in 1578. This was the first popular historical work written in a South Slavic vernacular in the Habsburg lands. In 1586 in Varaždin, Vramec published a book of sermons and comments titled Postilla po nedelne i po godovne dni na vse leto vezda znovič spravlena po Antonu Vramcu Svetoga pisma doktoru i cirkve varaždinske plebanušu. Both books were printed by Joannes Manlius. To suppress liturgical books published by the Protestant Reformation Vramec deliberately used simple language spoken by the population of Slavonia in his works. It is possible that Vramec's Postilla was published in 1586 in Varaždin to follow the orders of Juraj Drašković, the bishop of the Roman Catholic Archdiocese of Zagreb, who ordered publishing of new books to dispute writings of Mihajlo Bučić.

A sample from the Kronika vezda znovich :

1544. Grad Velika zauiet be od Turkou, izdan od nekih kmeticheu.

1545. Turczi robili zu na ſlouenieh, terze zouo Petrouzki ali Kraleuzki Turczi. Miklouuſa Zrinſzkoga Bana Szlouenſzkoga, pod Konſzkim Turczi razbiſse i porobiſse dozta. Opet na Kraincze, pole latnechko, oberh Koztanieuicze poleg vode Kerke, Turczi porobiſe i odpelaſse dozta liudi. Grad Moiſzlauinu ieſzu ouoleto Turzy vzeli.

1556. Zygetgrad obſzedoſse veliku mochiu Turczy, terti eruati iako pocheſse. Da dobri Vitez i Kapitan Marko Horuat, ſzile i iakozti Turſzkoi obderſa grada Zigeta. Ferdinand Herczeg Bechky zin Kralia Ferdinanda, z uoizku dole g Bobouiſchu doide i opet odze grada Bobouiſche od Turkou i oſztale okolu gradi.

Koſztaniczu grad Turczi zauieſse, Zdal ie Grada neky Nemecz Loztohar, ky ie bil Kapitan v Gradu, za peneze Turkom, zkoteroga grada vſza Horuaczka zemlia opuſzte i Szlouenſzka.

1566. Soliman Turſzky Czar na Vogreh zuoiſzku i ſzylu veliku i nezgouornu doide, i Grad mochni i terdny Zyget podszede, vkom grade ie bil Goſzp: Miklouus Zrinzky Groff, Kapitan. Czar vze grada i Zrinſzky Miklouus onde v gradu poginu i vmorien be za veru Kerſzanzku u dober iaki i mochna zercza Vitez: Glauu odſzekſy niegoun Turczy, poſztaſe Maximilianu Czeſzaru v Tabor.

1566. Szoliman Czar takaiſe pod Zygetom vmre Mahumetu ſzuoiemu da vruku Duſu. Szultan Szelim po ſzuoiem Oteze Szolimane, Turfzky i Czarigradzky Czar posta, gda bi bil ſztar cheterdeſzet i due lete od Ottomanſzkoga pokolenia.

== Sources ==
- Jembrih, Alojz (1992). O Vramčevoj Kronici. Kršćanska sadašnjost.
- Jembrih, Alojz; Bratulić, Josip (1989). Hrvatski biografski leksikon: Bj-C. Leksikografski zavod Miroslav Krleža. ISBN 978-953-6036-18-9.
- Vramec, Antun; Klaić, Vjekoslav (1908). Kronika. Ex officina Societatis Typographicae.
