= Dubice =

- Village
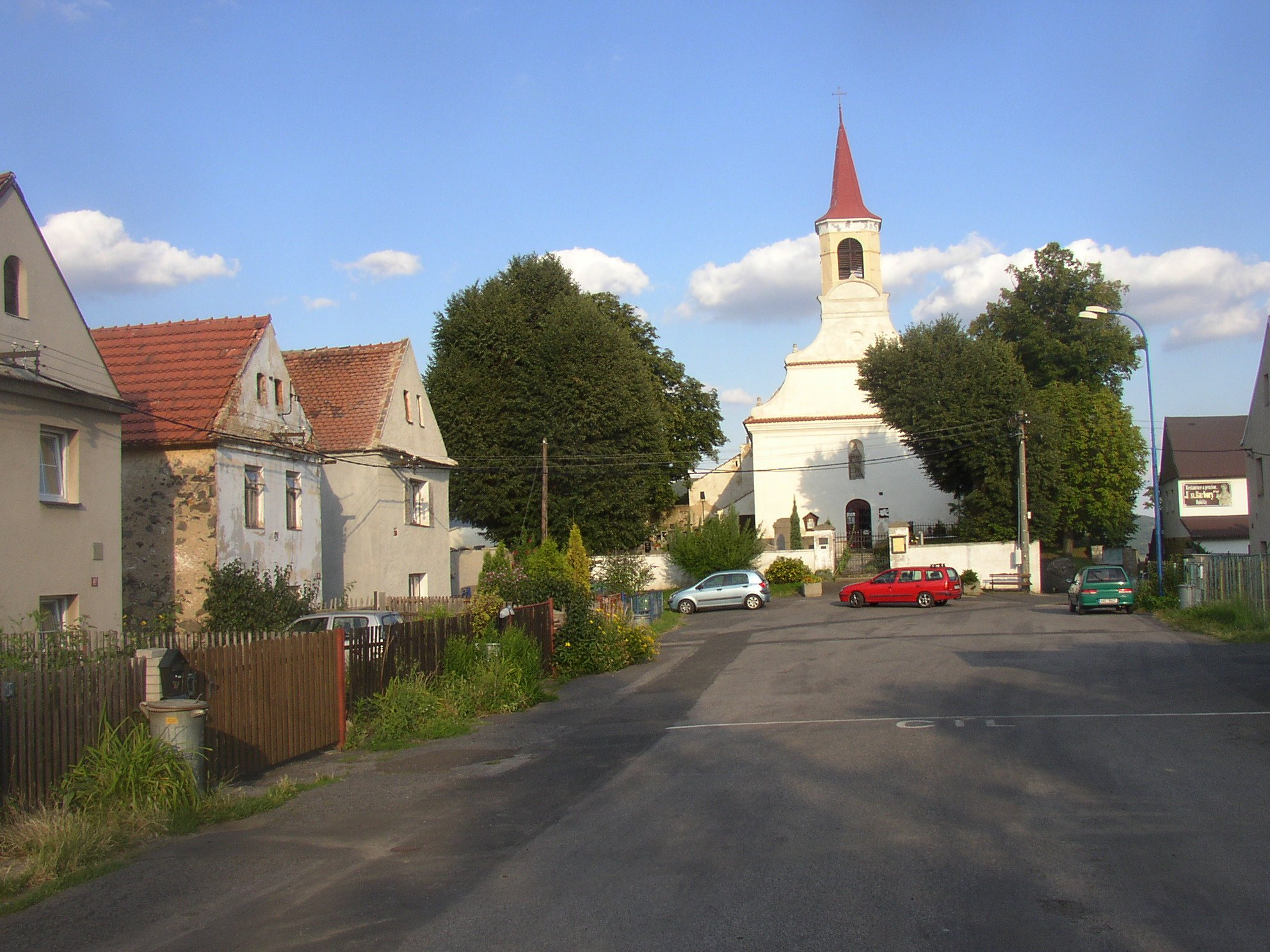

- Location within Czech Republic
- Coordinates: 50°35′45.1″N 14°0′54.1″E
- Country: Czech Republic
- Region: Ústí nad Labem
- District: Ústí nad Labem
- Postal code: 400 04

Dubice is a small village in the north of the Czech Republic. It lies 13 kilometres from Usti nad Labem, near Dolni Zalezly or Rehlovice, 325 metres above sea level. It has 233 inhabitants. It is known for its church Saint Barbora from where is a view on Porta Bohemica and Labe. This church was built in 1589–1595 and rebuilt in 1643 and 1820. Next to it is a restaurant where you can sit and watch the Labe valley. Dubice also has a football team Sokol Dubice.
