= Johann Manlius =

- Died: 1605; Deutschkreutz
- Occupations: Typographer, woodcutter

Johann Manlius (Latin: Joannes Manlius, Slovene: Janez Mandelc) was an early modern era typographer who ran a printing house that served small towns in Habsburg Hungary. He was also a woodcutter.

== Sources ==
- Svoboda, Branko (1958). Stare vinogradske kurije i klijeti. Kulturno-prosvjetno društvo Hrvatskih zagoraca "Matija Gubec,".
- Jurić, Šime (1956). Pregled povijesti knjižnica: s kratkim prikazom razvoja pisma i knjige. Kultura.
- Clair, Colin (1976). A History of European Printing. Academic Press. ISBN 978-0-12-174850-0.
- Issues (1978). Print Review. Prints.
