= István Werbőczy =

Hungarian legal theorist and statesman (1458–1541)

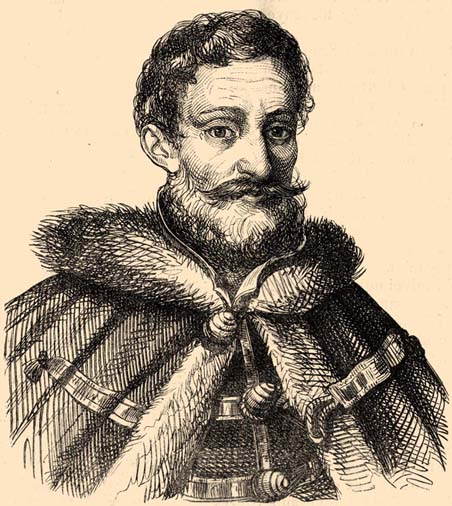

Palatine of Hungary
- Reign: 6 July 1525 – 24 April 1526
- Predecessor: István Báthory
- Successor: István Báthory
- Born: c. 1458; Verbőc, Kingdom of Hungary (today: Verbovec, Ukraine)
- Died: 13 October 1541 (aged 82–83); Budin, Budin Eyalet, Ottoman Hungary (today: Budapest, Hungary)
- Noble family: House of Werbőczy
- Spouses: 1. from Szobi family 2. Katalin Hercegh; 3. Anna Surányi
- Issue: Imre Werbőczy; Erzsébet Werbőczy
- Father: Osvát Werbőczy
- Mother: Apollónia Deák
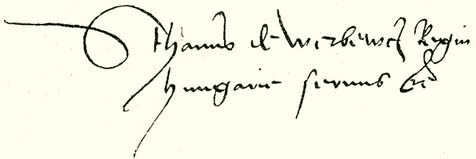
- Signature
- Occupation: Jurist, Politician

István Werbőczy or Stephen Werbőcz (also spelled Verbőczy and Latinized to Verbeucius 1458? – 1541) was a Hungarian legal theorist and statesman, author of the Hungarian Customary Law, who first became known as a legal scholar and theologian of such eminence that he was appointed to accompany Emperor Charles V to Worms, to take up the cudgels against Martin Luther. In this letter, Pope Clement VII also commended Werbőczy as scholar for his eminence in canon law and theology during Werbőczy's dispute with Martin Luther at the Imperial Diet of Nuremberg. His interests focused on Roman Law, Canon Law and the Hungarian legal system.

== Life ==
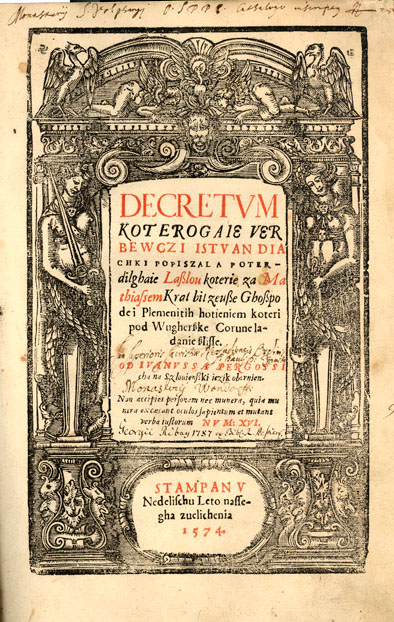
His influential work: Tripartitum

He began his political career as the deputy of Ugocsa County to the Hungarian diet of 1498, in which his eloquence and scholarship had a great effect in procuring the extension of the privileges of the gentry and the exclusion of all foreign competitors for the Hungarian throne in future elections. He was the spokesman and leader of the gentry against the magnates and prelates at the diets of 1500, 1501 and 1505. At the last diet he insisted, in his petition to the king, that the law should be binding upon all the gentry alike, and firmly established in the minds of the people the principle of a national monarchy.

The most striking proof of his popularity at this time is the fact that the diet voted him two denarii per hearth for his services in 1505, a circumstance unexampled in Hungarian history. In 1517 Werbőczy was appointed the guardian of the infant Louis II, and was sent on a foreign mission to solicit the aid of Christendom against the Turks. On his return he found the strife of parties fiercer than ever and the whole country in a state of anarchy.

At the diet of Hatvan, on 25 June 1525, he delivered a reconciliatory oration which so affected the assembly that it elected him palatine. During the brief time he held that office, he unselfishly and courageously endeavoured to serve both king and people by humbling the pride of the magnates who were primarily responsible for the dilapidation of the realm. But he was deposed at the following diet, and retired from public life until the election of János Szapolyai, who realized his theory of a national king and from whom he accepted the chancellorship. He now devoted himself entirely to the study of jurisprudence, and the result of his labors was the famous Opus tripartitum juris consuetudinarii inclyti regni hungariae (commonly called simply the Tripartitum), the de facto lawbook of Hungary until 1848—although as late as 1945 some laws of inheritance were still regulated by this work.

The full Latin text (with English translation) of Werbőczy's Tripartitum (as printed by Singrenius in 1517) was published as The Customary Law of the Renowned Kingdom of Hungary: A Work in Three Parts, the "Tripartitum" = Tripartitum opus iuris consuetudinarii inclyti regni Hungariæ; edited and translated by János M. Bak, Péter Banyó, and Martyn Rady; with an introductory study by László Péter; Schlacks and CEU Press, Idyllwild, CA, and Budapest, 2005.

== Bibliography ==
- Kármán, Gábor; Kunčević, Lovro (2013). The European Tributary States of the Ottoman Empire in the Sixteenth and Seventeenth Centuries. Leiden: Brill. ISBN 9789004246065.
  Political offices
  Preceded by János Erdődy	Chief justice 1516–1525	Succeeded by Miklós Thuróczy
  Preceded by Stephen Báthory	Palatine of Hungary; 1525–1526	Succeeded by Stephen Báthory
