= Tripartitum =

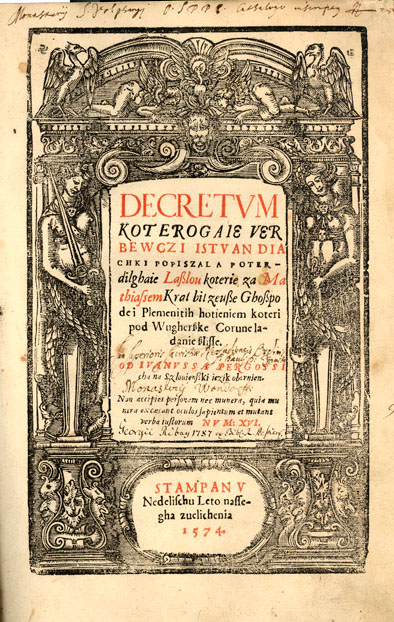
Front page of "Decretum tripartitum", the Croatian version of Hungarian original, edited by Ivanuš Pergošić and printed in 1574 in Nedelišće

The Tripartitum or Opus Tripartitum (in full, Latin: Tripartitum opus iuris consuetudinarii inclyti regni Hungariae, "Customary Law of the Renowned Kingdom of Hungary in Three Parts") is a manual of Hungarian customary law which István Werbőczy began to compile in 1504 in Alsópetény, completed in 1514, and was first published at Vienna in 1517. Although it never received official approval due to the political effects caused by the peasant revolt led by György Dózsa, it was highly influential and went through fifty editions in three hundred years. The Tripartitum did not include the so-called written law (parliamentary laws, royal decrees and statutes of the assemblies of the counties and the statutes of the free royal cities), which were always recorded in the law books after the decisions.

Werbőczy was a Hungarian jurist, royal magistrate, royal personal secretary and Palatine of Hungary and the Tripatitum "enshrines the ideals of a typical contemporary member of his class". It asserts the privileges of the nobility against the crown, the equality of all nobles as against the claims of superiority of the upper nobility (magnates) and the onerous duties of serfs. A peasant revolt led by György Dózsa had been suppressed earlier in 1514, which influenced Werbőczy. The Tripartitum played a large role in perpetuating Hungary's feudal system.
