= Tavenna =

- Comune
- Comune di Tavenna
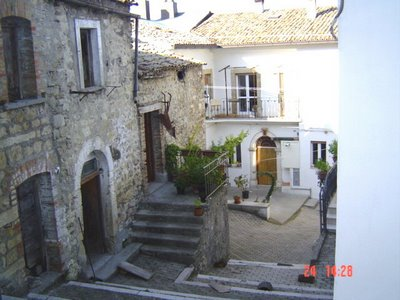
- View of Tavenna

- Location within Italy Location within Molise
- Coordinates: 41°55′N 14°46′E
- Country: Italy
- Region: Molise
- Province: Campobasso (CB)

Government
  - Mayor: Paolo Cirulli (since 26-5-2019)

Area
  - Total: 21.97 km^{2} (8.48 sq mi)
- Elevation: 550 m (1,800 ft)

Population (31 December 2017)
  - Total: 675
  - Density: 30.7/km^{2} (79.6/sq mi)
- Demonym: Tavennesi
- Time zone: UTC+1 (CET)
  - Summer (DST): UTC+2 (CEST)
- Postal code: 86030
- Dialing code: 0875
- Website: Official website

Tavenna is a comune (municipality) in the Province of Campobasso in the Italian region Molise, located about 40 kilometres (25 mi) north of Campobasso.

Tavenna borders the following municipalities: Acquaviva Collecroce, Mafalda, Montenero di Bisaccia, Palata, San Felice del Molise.

== See also ==
- Molise Croats
