= Milan Rešetar =

Croatian and Serbian linguist and literary historian (1860–1942)

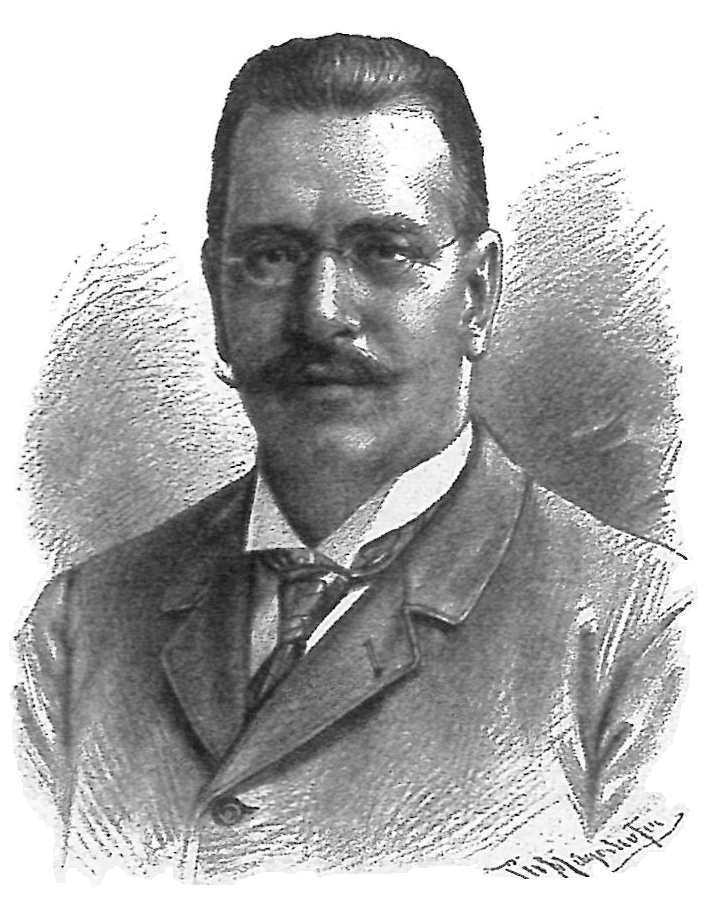
- Born: February 1, 1860; Dubrovnik, Austrian Empire
- Died: January 14, 1942 (aged 81); Florence, Italy
- Occupations: linguist, Ragusologist, literary historian

Milan Rešetar (February 1, 1860 – January 14, 1942) was a Croatian and Serbian linguist, literary historian and numismatist.

== Biography ==
Rešetar was born in Dubrovnik. After the gymnasium in Dubrovnik, he studied classical philology and Slavic languages in Vienna and Graz. He worked as a high-school professor in Koper, Zadar and Split, and later a professor of Slavic studies on the universities of Vienna and Zagreb). He was a student of Vatroslav Jagić.

Rešetar was a notable member of the Serb-Catholic movement in Dubrovnik. In his earlier years he followed the notion that speakers of Chakavian are Croats and speakers of Shtokavian are Serbs; later in his life he regarded Serbs and Croats as one single nation. In accordance with that position, he published two versions of his Serbo-Croatian grammar – one with examples in Latin script and the other in Cyrillic: Elementar-Grammatik der serbischen (kroatischen) Sprache / Elementar-Grammatik der kroatischen (serbischen) Sprache (1916). After retirement, he moved to Florence where he died in 1942.

The main areas of his works included dialectology and accentology of Serbo-Croatian, particularly of Shtokavian (Der štokavische Dialekt, Vienna, 1907), as well as critical editions of 15th to 18th century Dubrovnik writers for the Yugoslav Academy of Sciences and Arts. He also wrote a monograph on Molise Croats (Die serbokroatischen Kolonien Süditaliens, 1911).

This volume concerns itself with the highly-interesting South Slavic enclave in Molise of the province of Naples, the three communities of Montemitro, San Felice del Molise, and Acquaviva Collecroce. Remote from the lines from which the greater events of history moved in the Middle Ages, the three communities have remained singularly conservative of ancestral type in habit and speech. Even at the present they lie remote from the travel routes and scarcely touched by the modern life of Italy save in so far as the Government reaches out to them hands collecting taxes and drawing their youth into military service. The moot point of the period at which this Molise colony was founded and the circumstances under which it came to fixity is carefully discussed with a full apparatus of historical record. Upon the same point the author, with great skill in the interpretation of speech record, masses the weight of his philological acumen in the linguistic section of the work. He succeeds in orienting the Molise dialect upon the great body of Slavic speech and shows where the migration was derived; and, by a critical examination of speech forms, is able to identify the period quite independently of the formal record of documents. It affords a most interesting example of the contribution of philology to the art of a historian.

— From a review in Bulletin of the American Geographic Society (Vol. 45, No. 4 (1913) pp. 303–304) by William Churchill.

He produced a critical edition of Petar II Petrović Njegoš's The Mountain Wreath with philological commentary. He was also engaged in the field of numismatics (Dubrovačka numizmatika, 2 vols., 1924-1925), inheriting the interest and coin collection from his father Pavle, the last commander in Kotor during Petar II Petrović Njegoš's lifetime. His collection is now kept at the National Museum in Prague.

== Works (selection) ==
Rešetar wrote in Serbo-Croatian, German and Italian.

- Die čakavština und deren einstige und jetzige Grenzen (Čakavian Dialect, its Past and Present Boundaries, 1891), in: Archiv für slavische Philologie, vol. 13
- Antologija dubrovačke lirike [Anthology of Dubrovnik Lyric Poetry], Belgrade 1894
- Die serbokroatische Betonung südwestlicher Mundarten (Serbo-Croatian Accentuation of the South-Western Dialects, 1900)
- Der štokavische Dialekt (Štokavian Dialect, 1907)
- Die serbokroatischen Kolonien Süditaliens, Wien 1911 (Südslawische Dialektstudien; 5; Schriften der Balkankommission, Linguistische Abteilung; 9) (in Italian translatian: Le colonie serbocroate nell’Italia meridionale, Campobasso 1997)
- Elementar-Grammatik der serbischen (kroatischen) Sprache / Elementar- Grammatik der kroatischen (serbischen) Sprache, Zagreb 1916
  - 2nd ed. Zagreb 1922
  - 3rd ed. Halle 1957, 4th ed. Halle 1959, as Elementargrammatik der serbokroatischen Sprache
- Dubrovačka numizmatika, 2 vols., Belgrade 1924/25
- Popis dubrovačkih vlasteoskijeh porodica, Godišnjak Dubrovačkog učenog društva "Sveti Vlaho", knj. 1, Dubrovnik, 1929
- Nikša Zvijezdić, dubrovački srpski kancelar XV. vijeka (Nikša Zvijezdić, A Serbian Chancellor in Dubrovnik in the 15th Century). In: Glas - Srpska kraljevska akademija, 169 (1936)
- Najstariji dubrovački govor (The Oldest Dialect of Dubrovnik, 1951)
- Najstarija dubrovačka proza (The Oldest Prose from Dubrovnik, 1952), Posebna izdanja : Odeljenje literature i jezika / Srpska akademija nauka
