= Giovanni de Rubertis =

Italian poet and translator (1813–1889)

- Born: December 25, 1813; Acquaviva Collecroce, Molise, Italy
- Died: April 20, 1889 (aged 75); Acquaviva Collecroce, Molise, Italy
- Occupation: School principal
- Known for: Member of the Serbian Learned Society

Giovanni de Rubertis (25 December 1813 – 20 April 1889) was an Italian poet and translator of the Molise Slavs.

Born in Acquaviva Collecroce (Kruč), he was the principal of the Casacalenda gymnasium. He proved key for the preservation of national consciousness and identity among the Serbs in Molise. He was a great friend with Medo Pucić, whose lyrics were translated into Italian. During his research on the Serbs in the south of Italy, Risto Kovačić visited De Rubertis in 1884. From January 1885 he became a correspondent member of the Serbian Learned Society.

According to Graziadio Isaia Ascoli, De Rubertis considered the Schiavoni (Slavs) or Dalmati (Dalmatians) of Molise as Serbs that were brought there by Skanderbeg during his Italian expedition in 1460–1462 along with the Albanians.

He died in Acquaviva Collecroce.

== See also ==
- Molise Croatian dialect
- Serb-Catholic movement in Dubrovnik
