= Diaspora language =

Languages of diasporic populations

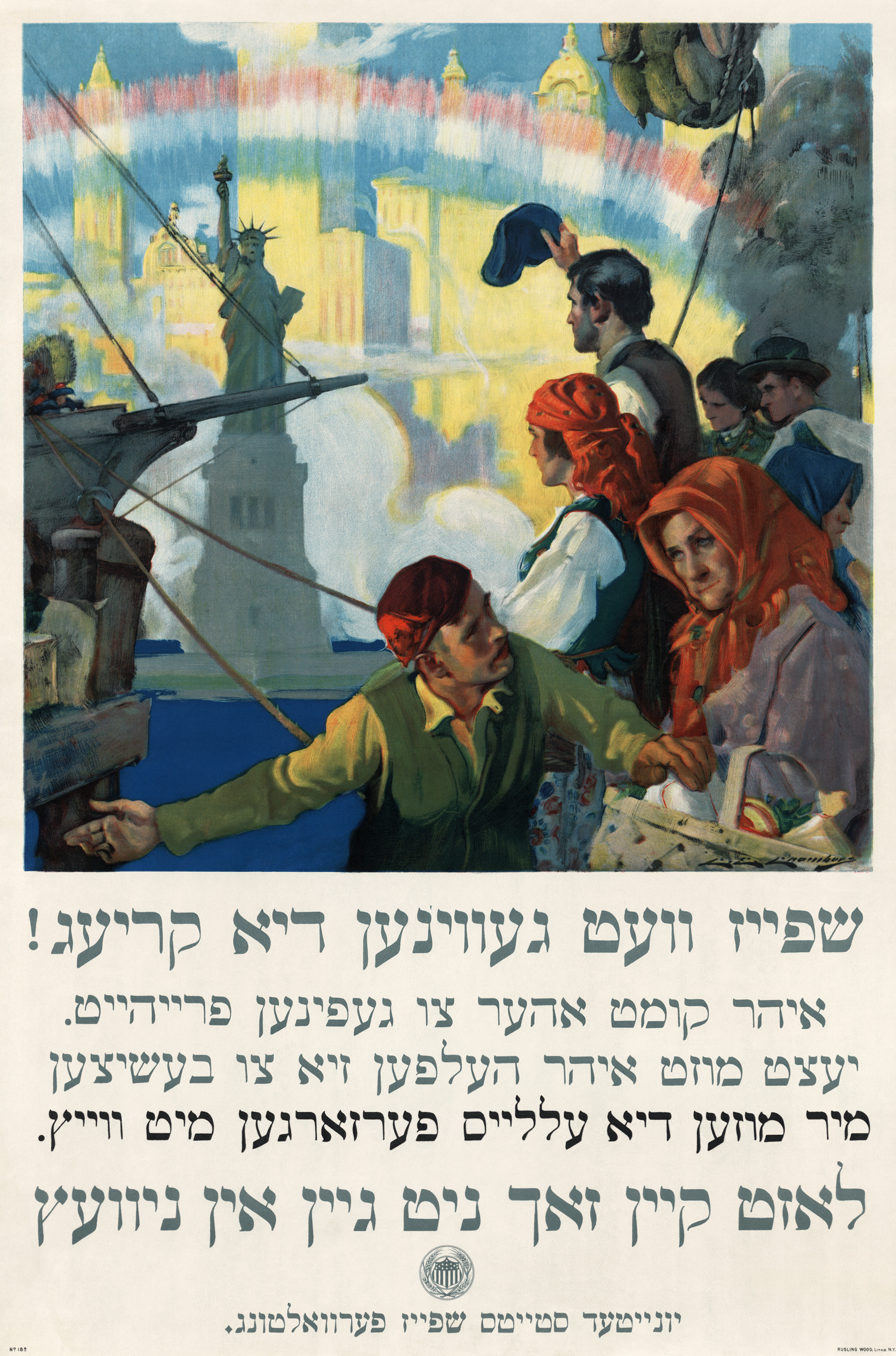
American World War I-era poster in Yiddish. Translated caption: "Food will win the war – You came here seeking freedom, now you must help to preserve it – We must supply the Allies with wheat – Let nothing go to waste". Colour lithograph, 1917. Digitally restored.

The term diaspora language, coined in the 1980s, is a sociolinguistic idea referring to a variety of languages spoken by peoples with common roots who have dispersed, under various pressures and often globally. The emergence and evolution of a diaspora language is usually part of a larger attempt to retain cultural identity.

== Examples ==
=== Molisanne (Molise Slavic) ===
Though possessing certain elements of Slavic languages, Molise Slavic is also influenced by Italian. Considered an endangered language, Molise Slavic is spoken by approximately 3,500 people in the villages of Montemitro, San Felice del Molise, and Acquaviva Collecroce in southern Molise, as well as elsewhere in southern Italy. The language developed as a result of refugees arriving in Italy from the eastern Adriatic coast during the 15th and 16th centuries.

=== Istro-Romanian ===
Another diaspora language is Istro-Romanian, spoken by the Istro-Romanians. Like Molise Slavic, it is considered endangered, with only 500 to 1000 speakers remaining. Istro-Romanian developed when the ancestors of these individuals migrated to Istria from Transylvania (some say Serbia) during the 12th century.

=== Griko ===
Griko language (endonym: Griko/Γκρίκο), sometimes spelled Grico, is one of the two dialects of Italiot Greek (the other being Calabrian Greek or Grecanico), spoken by Griko people in Salento, province of Lecce, Italy. Some Greek linguists consider it to be a Modern Greek dialect and often call it Katoitaliótika (Greek: Κατωιταλιώτικα, lit. 'Southern Italian') or Grekanika (Γραικάνικα). Griko and Standard Modern Greek are partially mutually intelligible. The Griko language is the last living trace of the Greek elements that once formed Magna Graecia.

=== Gallo-Italic languages in Southern Italy ===
Distribution of Gallo-Italic of Sicily

Varieties of Gallo-Italic languages are also found in Sicily, corresponding with the central-eastern parts of the island that received large numbers of immigrants from Northern Italy, called Lombards, during the decades following the Norman conquest of Sicily (around 1080 to 1120). Given the time that has lapsed and the influence from the Sicilian language itself, these dialects are best generically described as Southern Gallo-Italic. The major centres where these dialects can still be heard today include Piazza Armerina, Aidone, Sperlinga, San Fratello, Nicosia, and Novara di Sicilia. Northern Italian dialects did not survive in some towns in the province of Catania that developed large Lombard communities during this period, namely Randazzo, Paternò and Bronte. However, the Northern Italian influence in the local varieties of Sicilian are marked. In the case of San Fratello, some linguists suggested that the nowadays dialect has Provençal as its basis, having been a fort manned by Provençal mercenaries in the early decades of the Norman conquest (bearing in mind that it took the Normans 30 years to conquer the whole of the island).

Other dialects, attested from 13th and 14th century, are also found in Basilicata, more precisely in the province of Potenza (Tito, Picerno, Pignola and Vaglio Basilicata), Trecchina, Rivello, Nemoli and San Costantino.

=== Arbëresh ===
Distribution of Albanian language dialects

Arbëresh language (gluha/gjuha/gjufa Arbëreshe; also known as Arbërisht) are the Albanian linguistic varieties spoken by the Arbëreshë people of Italy, brought there by several migratory waves of Albanians from Albania and Greece since the Late Middle Ages. Arbëresh varieties are derived from the old Tosk Albanian varieties spoken in the south-western Balkans, and throughout the centuries they have developed in Italy in contact with the neighboring Italo-Romance speaking communities. Other Tosk Albanian varieties from the Late Middle Ages referred to as Arvanitika (endonym: arbërisht) are spoken in Greece by the Arvanites. E Mbësuame e Krështerë (1592) by Luca Matranga from Piana degli Albanesi is the earliest known Old Tosk text, a translation of a catechism book from Latin.

The Arbëreshë people are bilingual, also speaking Italian. Arbëresh is classified as Definitely Endangered by the UNESCO Atlas of the World's Languages in Danger. While Italian law protects the language and culture of the Albanian people in Italy, the language taught at school and university is Standard Albanian, constituting an issue for the Arbëresh communities' preservation of their native idiom, which has remained separated from the main Albanian-speaking compact area for around 500 years. Alongside the fact that Arbëresh is rarely written, another issue for the language attrition is the differentiation between the Albanian varieties used in Italy: the Arbëresh local idioms in some areas are so different from each other that Arbëresh people of those areas use Italian or Standard Albanian as lingua franca to communicate with each other.

=== AAVE in the African American Diaspora ===
Speech example
An example of a man from New York City with an African-American Vernacular English accent (Eric Adams).

A study of African American enclaves in Nova Scotia, Canada, and Samaná, Dominican Republic, shows a high similarity in the African American Vernacular English (AAVE) spoken there and the early versions of AAVE that originated in the south during the 19th century. AAVE in the United States on the other hand has changed substantially due in part to the Great Migration that happened in the twentieth century. Unusually, while most examples have a diaspora causing differences in language due to influence from another culture and languages, these enclaves maintained a form of language closer to the historical source, or branching point.

=== Hindlish or Hinglish ===
The great number of Hindi speakers in the United Kingdom has produced a strain of the language unlike that spoken on the Indian subcontinent where it began. This has given rise to Hindlish, also known as Hinglish, an informal term for the mixture of Hindi and English that includes such phrases as city kotwali or "city police station." Hinglish is not considered a full-blown diaspora language but it appears to be developing into one.

=== Yiddish and the Jewish Diaspora ===
Yiddish is a major linguistic creation of the Jewish Diaspora, originating in what is now Germany. It is one of many languages that emerged as a result of the migration of the Jewish people throughout Europe, alongside Ladino (Judeo-Spanish), Italkian (Judeo-Italian), Knaanic (Judeo-Slavic), Yevanic (Judeo-Greek), and Zarphatic (Judeo-French). Of these languages, Yiddish produced the most significant literature and served as an icon of Jewish identity throughout Central and Eastern Europe.

=== Yoruba or Lucumi ===
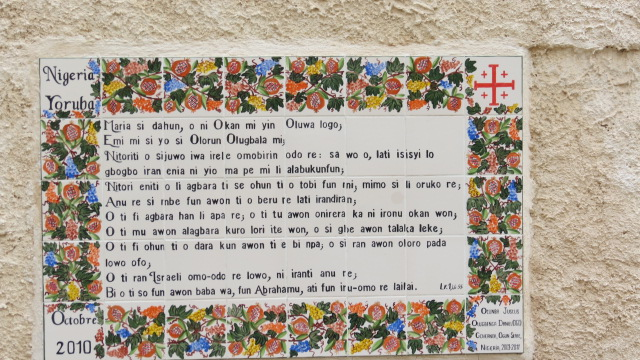
Yoruba language hymn, Church of the Visitation, Jerusalem

The Yoruba language can be found across the globe, on every continent, however enforced migration under colonial slavery resulted in a particular density in the Americas and pressure on Yoruba speakers to adapt or assimilate. In the Caribbean, in particular, Yoruba culture, religion, and language have co-evolved with the needs of the enslaved populations, generating extensive hybridization and surviving into the current era. The Santeria religion draws its roots from Catholic, Yoruba and Native American spiritual traditions, and its liturgical language is Lucumi, a dialect of the original predominantly Nigerian Yoruba.

=== Canadian Gaelic ===
In the aftermath of the Highland and Lowland Clearances, a great number of Scots emigrated to Canada, proportionately more than the other Anglo New World countries of the United States, Australia, and even New Zealand. They brought with them their language, and while many spoke Scots or English, a great number spoke Gaelic. It was even debated in the early days of Canadian Confederation whether to make Gaelic (inclusive of both the Scottish and Irish varieties) the third official language of Canada, and, if Irish and Scottish are counted together, Gaelic was the most common native tongue amongst the Fathers of Confederation of Canada, more common than French or English, and the first Canadian Prime Minister, John A. Macdonald, spoke it as his mother tongue. Canadian Gaelic is considered to be similar to the western dialects of Gaidhlig in Scotland.

=== Cocoliche ===
Cocoliche is an Italian–Spanish contact language or pidgin that was spoken by Italian immigrants between 1870 and 1970 in Argentina (especially in Greater Buenos Aires) and from there spread to other urban areas nearby, such as La Plata, Rosario and Montevideo, Uruguay. In recent decades it has become more respected and even recorded in music and film. Traces of it may be found in Argentina, Brazil, Albania, Panama, Quebec, Uruguay, Venezuela, San Marcos, Cabo Verde and many other places.

=== Talian ===
Municipalities where Talian is co-official in Rio Grande do Sul, Brazil

Talian (Venetian: [taˈljaŋ], Portuguese: [tɐliˈɐ̃]), or Brazilian Venetian, or Vêneto is a Venetian dialect spoken primarily in the Serra Gaúcha region in the northeast of the state of Rio Grande do Sul in Brazil. It is also spoken in other parts of Rio Grande do Sul, as well as in parts of Espírito Santo and of Santa Catarina. Talian is mainly a Venetian dialect mixed with Italian dialects from the Veneto region as well as Lombardy and other Italian regions, influenced by local Portuguese.

=== Lunfardo ===
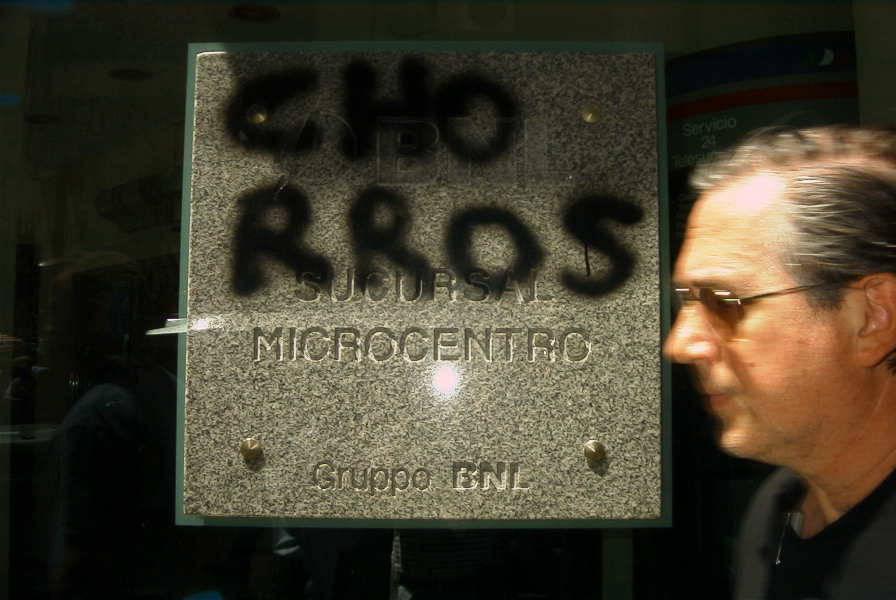
The word chorros (Lunfardo term meaning "thieves") graffitied on the wall of a BNL bank in Buenos Aires, during protests against Corralito, 2002.

Lunfardo (Spanish pronunciation: [luɱˈfaɾðo]; from the Italian lombardo or inhabitant of Lombardy, lumbard in Lombard) is an argot originated and developed in the late 19th and early 20th centuries in the lower classes in the Río de la Plata region (encompassing the port cities of Buenos Aires and Montevideo) and from there spread to other urban areas nearby, such as the Greater Buenos Aires, Santa Fe and Rosario.

Lunfardo originated from the mixture of languages and dialects produced due to the massive European immigration, mainly Italian and Spanish, which arrived in the ports of the region since the end of the 19th century. It was originally a slang used by criminals and soon by other people of the lower and lower-middle classes. Later, many of its words and phrases were introduced in the vernacular and disseminated in the Spanish of Argentina, and Uruguay. Nevertheless, since the early 20th century, Lunfardo has spread among all social strata and classes by habitual use or because it was common in the lyrics of tango.

Today, the meaning of the term lunfardo has been extended to designate any slang or jargon used in Buenos Aires.

=== Canadian Ukrainian ===
In the time of the Austro-Hungarian Empire, the province of Galicia was considered the poorest in all of Europe, and was considerably over-populated. While the western part, containing Kraków, was more densely populated and better maintained, the eastern part, overwhelmingly Ukrainian, was considered the most backward part of the Empire and good for little more than as a source of troops for the army. This led to a mass exodus of citizens, along with Ukrainians from the neighbouring region of Bukovina, to Canada, settling primarily in the Western provinces of The Prairies. They brought with them not just their religion – western Ukrainians are predominately Ukrainian Catholic whereas the rest of Ukraine is largely Eastern Orthodox – but also their language. To this day, Canadian Ukrainian is clearly reminiscent of the Western dialects, and has minimal influence from Russian (given that it had never been part of the Russian Empire and was only conquered by the Soviet Union after WWII, long after the Canadian Ukrainian community had been established), but proportionately greater influence from Polish and German, such as loanwords. The Canadian dialect frequently uses English words for technologies or concepts developed since the start of the 20th century, so while vocabulary like "coal" and "shoe" remain the same as their counterparts in Ukraine, newer concepts frequently use English loanwords for items such as "truck" and "cash register."

== See also ==
- Immigrant language
- Heritage language
- Canadian Gaelic
- Creole language

== Sources ==
- Matranga, Vito; Milano, Emma (2019). "Strategies for conservation of a minority language – Between convergence and hybridization". In Francesc Feliu; Olga Fullana (eds.). The Intricacy of Languages. IVITRA Research in Linguistics and Literatur. Vol. 20. John Benjamins Publishing Company. pp. 227–241. ISBN 978-90-272-6194-6.
- Matranga, Vito (2018). "Arbëreshë". In Thomas Krefeld; Roland Bauer (eds.). Lo spazio comunicativo dell'Italia e delle varietà italiane. Korpus im Text. Vol. 7. ISBN 978-3-95896-019-0.
