= Petacciato landslide =

Landslide in Italy

Coordinates: 42.014°N 14.871°E

Petacciato landslide is a landslide around Petacciato, Molise, Italy, which activity is documented since 1909. It is thought to be one of the largest in Europe.

In March 2015, the landslide broke asphalt causing deep step-like fractures.

On 7 April 2026, the landslide was reactivated following bad weather conditions. As a precaution, a section of the Autostrada A14 between Termoli and Vasto South in both directions, as well as some adjacent highways, were closed for traffic. The railway between Bari and Pescara was closed between Termoli and Montenero di Bisaccia. The motorway section opened the next day, with only one lane in each direction.
