= Mafalda, Molise =

Mafalda
- Comune
- Comune di Mafalda
- Location within Italy Location within Molise
- Coordinates: 41°57′N 14°43′E
- Country: Italy
- Region: Molise
- Province: Campobasso (CB)

Government
  - Mayor: Egidio Riccioni

Area
  - Total: 32.61 km^{2} (12.59 sq mi)
- Elevation: 460 m (1,510 ft)

Population (31 December 2010)
  - Total: 1,188
  - Density: 36.43/km^{2} (94.35/sq mi)
- Demonym: Mafaldesi
- Time zone: UTC+1 (CET)
  - Summer (DST): UTC+2 (CEST)
- Postal code: 86030
- Dialing code: 0875
- Patron saint: St. Valentine
- Saint day: 17 September
- Website: Official website

Mafalda is a comune (municipality) in the Province of Campobasso in the Italian region Molise, located about 45 kilometres (28 mi) north of Campobasso.

Mafalda borders the following municipalities: Dogliola, Fresagrandinaria, Lentella, Montenero di Bisaccia, San Felice del Molise, Tavenna, Tufillo.

== See also ==
- Molise Croats
