= Montenero di Bisaccia =

- Comune
- Comune di Montenero di Bisaccia
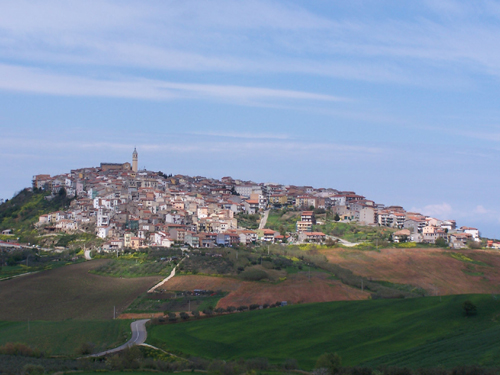
- Panorama of Montenero di Bisaccia

- Location within Italy Location within Molise
- Coordinates: 41°57′N 14°47′E
- Country: Italy
- Region: Molise
- Province: Campobasso (CB)
- Frazioni: Marina di Montenero, Montebello

Government
  - Mayor: Simona Contucci

Area
  - Total: 93.0 km^{2} (35.9 sq mi)
- Elevation: 273 m (896 ft)

Population (30 November 2017)
  - Total: 6,612
  - Density: 71.1/km^{2} (184/sq mi)
- Demonym: Monteneresi
- Time zone: UTC+1 (CET)
  - Summer (DST): UTC+2 (CEST)
- Postal code: 86036
- Dialing code: 0875
- Patron saint: Saint Matthew
- Saint day: 21 September

Montenero di Bisaccia is a small hill top town and comune (municipality). It is in the Province of Campobasso, which is in the region of Molise, in Italy. It is about 10 kilometres (6 mi) inland from the coast, and about 45 kilometres (28 mi) north of Campobasso. The nearest large town and airport is Pescara. Montenero di Bisaccia borders the following municipalities: Cupello, Guglionesi, Lentella, Mafalda, Montecilfone, Palata, Petacciato, San Felice del Molise, San Salvo, Tavenna.

The town is on the border between Abruzzo and Molise. The coat of arms depicts three hills, the middle one has a cross on it. The gonfalon is made of a blue cloth.

== People ==
- Birthplace of former judge and Italian minister, Antonio di Pietro
- Birthplace of Dardano Sacchetti

== See also ==
- Molise Croats
