= Saskatchewan Organization for Heritage Languages =

The Saskatchewan Organization for Heritage Languages (SOHL) is a provincial non-profit organization dedicated to promoting the study and teaching of heritage languages in the province. Based in Regina, Saskatchewan, it concentrates on languages other than Canada's official languages of English and French, and operates as an umbrella organization for groups, schools and individuals across the province. The SOHL was established in 1985.

The SOHL is governed by a board of directors and employs two permanent full-time staff members. Its membership consists of over 70 heritage language schools and multilingual organizations. Regular membership is open to any community-based non-profit organization in Saskatchewan involved in developing, teaching, and promoting the learning of heritage languages. Associate membership is open to individuals and institutions supportive of the aims and objectives of SOHL but not eligible for regular membership. Associate members cannot vote or hold office.

== History ==
SOHL had its formal beginning on June 1, 1985, and was designated a non-profit PCO in August 1987. In 1994, SOHL hosted a national conference entitled “Speak Up, Speak Out!” It focused on the job and economic opportunities created by languages and on the importance of languages in the international marketplace. In 1996/97, SOHL introduced a new project - the Mini-Language Lessons Program, into the public and separate school systems. Heritage language teachers introduced students to the culture and language of various countries in the world.

A Future Search Conference was held in 1999. The purpose was to look at past accomplishments and achievements of SOHL, to look at its current state and to begin the process of creating a new vision for the future. In 2004, SOHL celebrated Heritage Languages Recognition Day with a Choral Festival. Due to the positive response, celebrations are now held annually in both Regina and Saskatoon to mark this occasion.

In 2005, SOHL celebrated its 20th anniversary. Along with a special celebration at our conference, SOHL produced a Centennial History Book looking back at years of Heritage Language Schools in Saskatchewan. In 2008, SOHL celebrated UNESCO's declaration of 2008 as the International Year of Languages. A special Yearbook was compiled and published, which outlines SOHL's various activities, as well as those of MLAR, SIA, and the heritage schools.
