= Santa Maria Ester, Acquaviva Collecroce =

Catholic church in Campobasso province, Italy

Coordinates: 41°52′5.2″N 14°44′47.9″E

Santa Maria Ester is an ancient, Roman Catholic church built in Baroque style in the hill-town of Acquaviva Collecroce, in the Province of Campobasso, Region of Molise, Italy.

== History ==
Santa Maria Ester was originally built in the second half of the 16th century by the Knights of Malta. Also contributing to its erection were immigrant Croats who had participated in the Battle of Lepanto. That first church was rebuilt in Baroque style in 1715.

The belltower is even more recent (1976) and replaces the older one razed in 1963. The church has a central cupola; in the interior, are housed 16th century canvases depicting Madonna Addolorata, Santa Maria Ester, Saint Michael Archangel, Martyrdom of St Blaise, and a Madonna del Carmelo. It has two statues of St Michael and the Immaculate Conception by Di Zinno.
