= Palata, Italy =

Comune in Molise, Italy

Palata
- Comune
- Comune di Palata
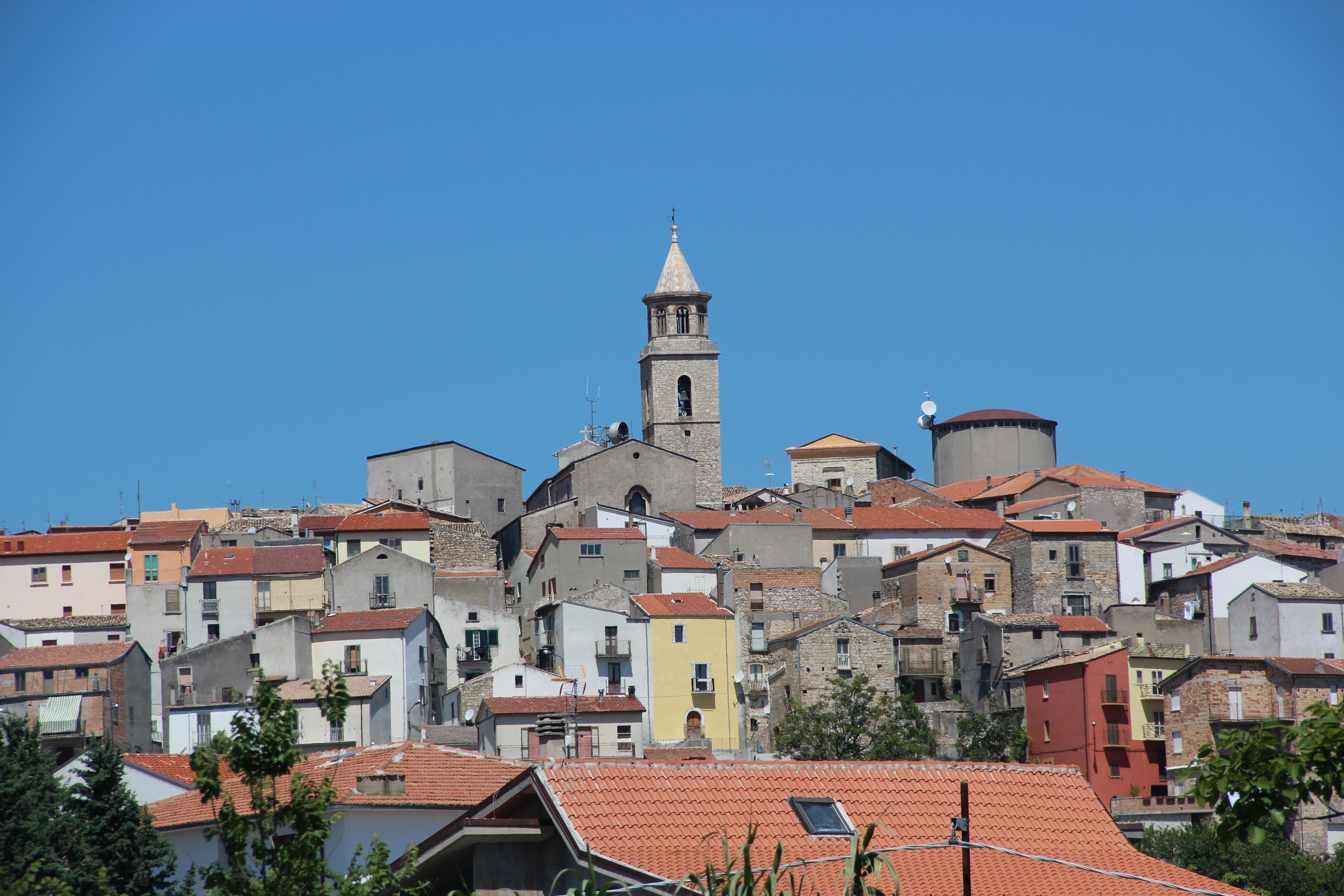
- View of Palata, Italy

- Location within Italy Location within Molise
- Coordinates: 41°53′N 14°47′E
- Country: Italy
- Region: Molise
- Province: Campobasso (CB)

Government
  - Mayor: Michele Berchicci

Area
  - Total: 43.82 km^{2} (16.92 sq mi)
- Elevation: 520 m (1,710 ft)

Population (30 November 2017)
  - Total: 1,678
  - Density: 38.29/km^{2} (99.18/sq mi)
- Demonym: Palatesi
- Time zone: UTC+1 (CET)
  - Summer (DST): UTC+2 (CEST)
- Postal code: 86037
- Dialing code: 0875
- Website: Official website

Palata is a comune (municipality) in the Province of Campobasso, located in the Italian region of Molise. It is situated about 35 kilometres (22 mi) northeast of Campobasso.

Palata borders the following municipalities: Acquaviva Collecroce, Guardialfiera, Guglionesi, Larino, Montecilfone, Montenero di Bisaccia, Tavenna.

== Twin towns ==
- Raszków, Poland, since 2012

== See also ==
- Molise Croats
- Duke of Palata
