= Petacciato =

- Comune
- Comune di Petacciato
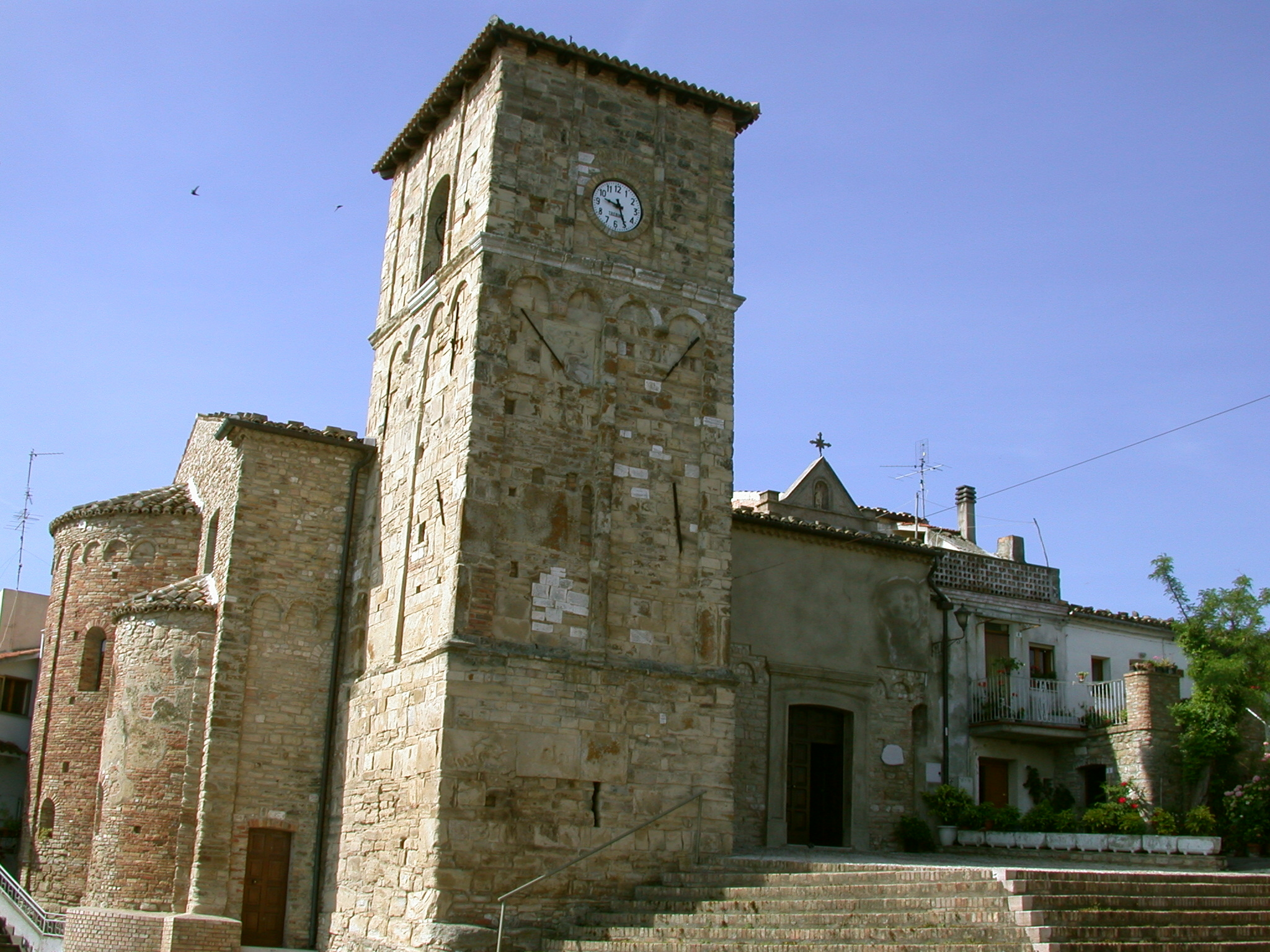
- Church of S.Maria Church located in the ancient village

- Location of the municipality of Petacciato in the province of Campobasso

- Location within Italy Location within Molise
- Coordinates: 42°00′39″N 14°51′41″E
- Country: Italy
- Region: Molise
- Province: Campobasso (CB)
- Frazioni: Collecalcioni, Marina di Petacciato

Government
  - Mayor: Antonio Di Pardo (Lista civica)

Area
  - Total: 34 km^{2} (13 sq mi)
- Elevation: 225 m (738 ft)

Population (December 31, 2025)
  - Total: 3,533
  - Density: 100/km^{2} (270/sq mi)
- Demonym: Petacciatesi
- Time zone: UTC+1 (CET)
  - Summer (DST): UTC+2 (CEST)
- Postal code: 86038
- Dialing code: 0875
- ISTAT code: 070051
- Patron saint: San Rocco
- Saint day: 16 August
- Website: Official website (in Italian)

Petacciato is a small town and comune in the province of Campobasso (Molise), in southern Italy and borders the following municipalities: Guglionesi, Montenero di Bisaccia, Termoli.

== Geography ==
A village on the Adriatic coast, it stands on a hill 225 m above sea level and its territory covers an area of 2,968 hectares. From its elevated position, it offers a panorama that extends from the Maiella mountains to the Gargano promontory, crossing the Tremiti Islands archipelago.

The entire area in a zone of high hydrogeological risk (Petacciato landslide), and the year of the first landslide dates back to 1916. Since then there have been about four or five alarms, culminating with the event on April 7, 2026.

== History ==
The history of Petacciato is very ancient but at the same time uncertain as there is partially dubious documentation regarding its origin and name. The territory has always been contested by various peoples and bandits.

The coastal village has been destroyed by earthquakes several times; those that occurred in 1117, 1125, and 1456 are worth mentioning. In 1463 Petacciato was again razed to the ground by the Angevins, in battle against the Aragonese whom Petacciato, together with Guglionesi, a neighboring town, had strenuously defended.

Towards the end of the 16th century Petacciato was invaded by the Turks, becoming a refuge for brigands. During its long and troubled history, Petacciato also experienced the rule of the D'Avalos family, a noble Neapolitan family who contributed significantly to the town's economic, social, cultural, and religious development.

Despite its thousand-year history, it became an autonomous municipality only on December 30, 1923, separating from Guglionesi.

== Monuments and places of interest ==
- Church of Santa Maria of Petacciato: built in Apulian Romanesque style in the 13th century with the restoration of Frederick II, the church was dedicated to San Rocco until 1967, and has a single nave.
- Church of San Rocco: Built in 1967 and inaugurated by Monsignor Giovanni Proni, it stands in the modern part of town, along Viale Pietravalle.
- Norman Castle: Located in the highest part of the old town, it dates back to the 11th century.
- Petacciato Tower: a coastal tower from the defense system against the Turks, commissioned by Charles V in the 16th century. The tower is now a ruin, split in two, in need of restoration.
- Buca, the ancient city lies between the Sinarca Tower and the Coastal Tower.

== Demographic evolution ==
Historical population

Year	Pop.	±%
1861	733	—
1871	752	+2.6%
1881	860	+14.4%
1901	1,531	+78.0%
1911	1,591	+3.9%
1921	2,062	+29.6%

Year	Pop.	±%
1931	2,193	+6.4%
1936	2,649	+20.8%
1951	3,170	+19.7%
1961	2,769	−12.6%
1971	2,845	+2.7%
1981	3,072	+8.0%

Year	Pop.	±%
1991	3,236	+5.3%
2001	3,406	+5.3%
2011	3,638	+6.8%
2021	3,494	−4.0%

Source: Data from ISTAT

== Infrastructure and transport ==
The municipality is served by the Montenero-Petacciato station on the Adriatic Railway and is connected by the Adriatica State Road 16, the Biferno Valley State Road 157, Termoli ring road 709, A14 motorway with Vasto Sud and Termoli exits.

== Gallery ==
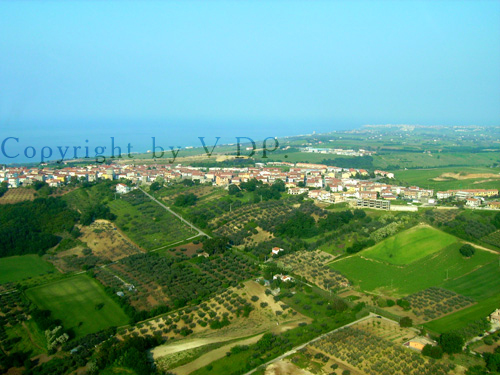
View of Petacciato, also known as "the terrace of lower Molise"

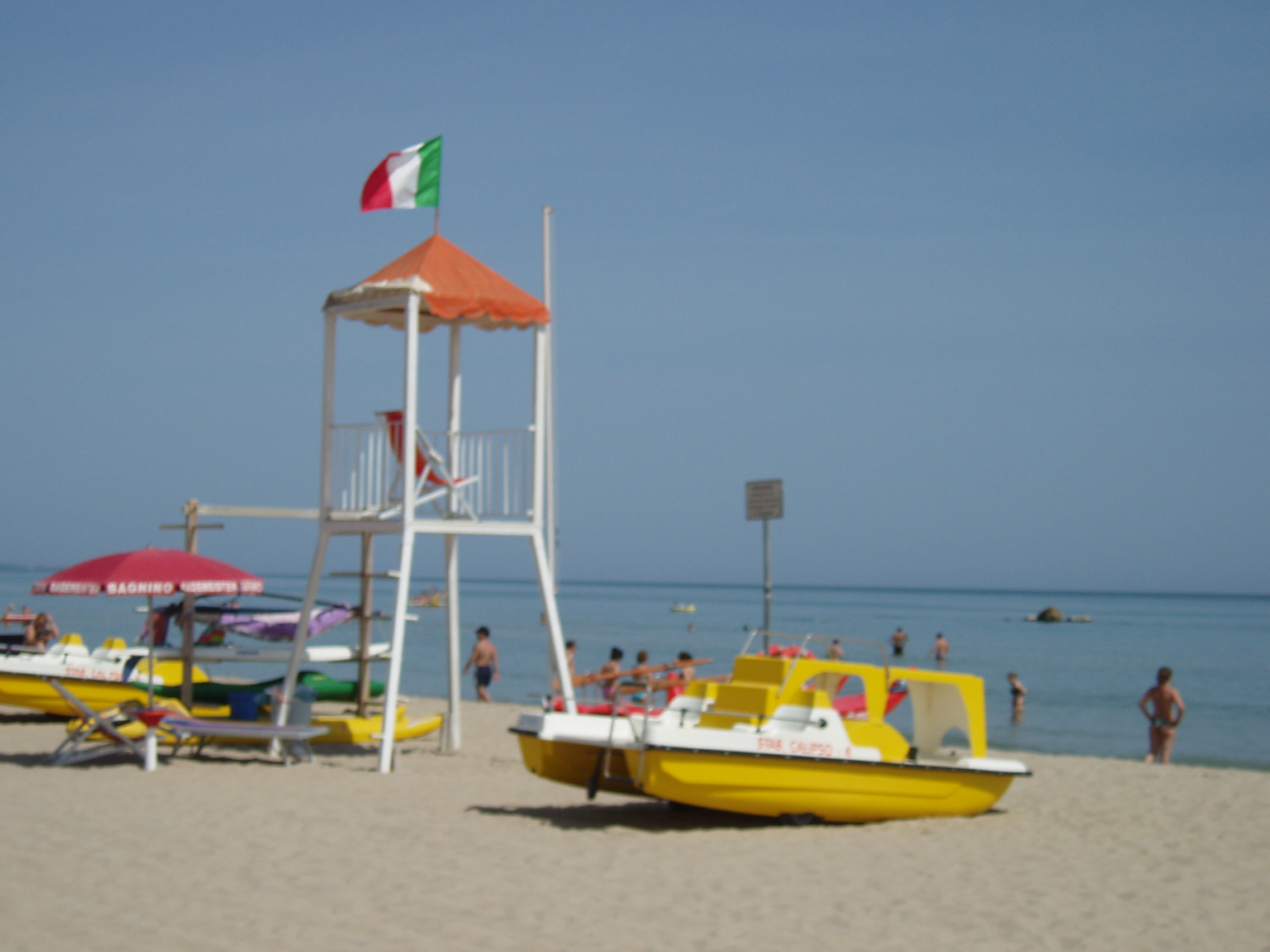
View of a beach resort in Petacciato

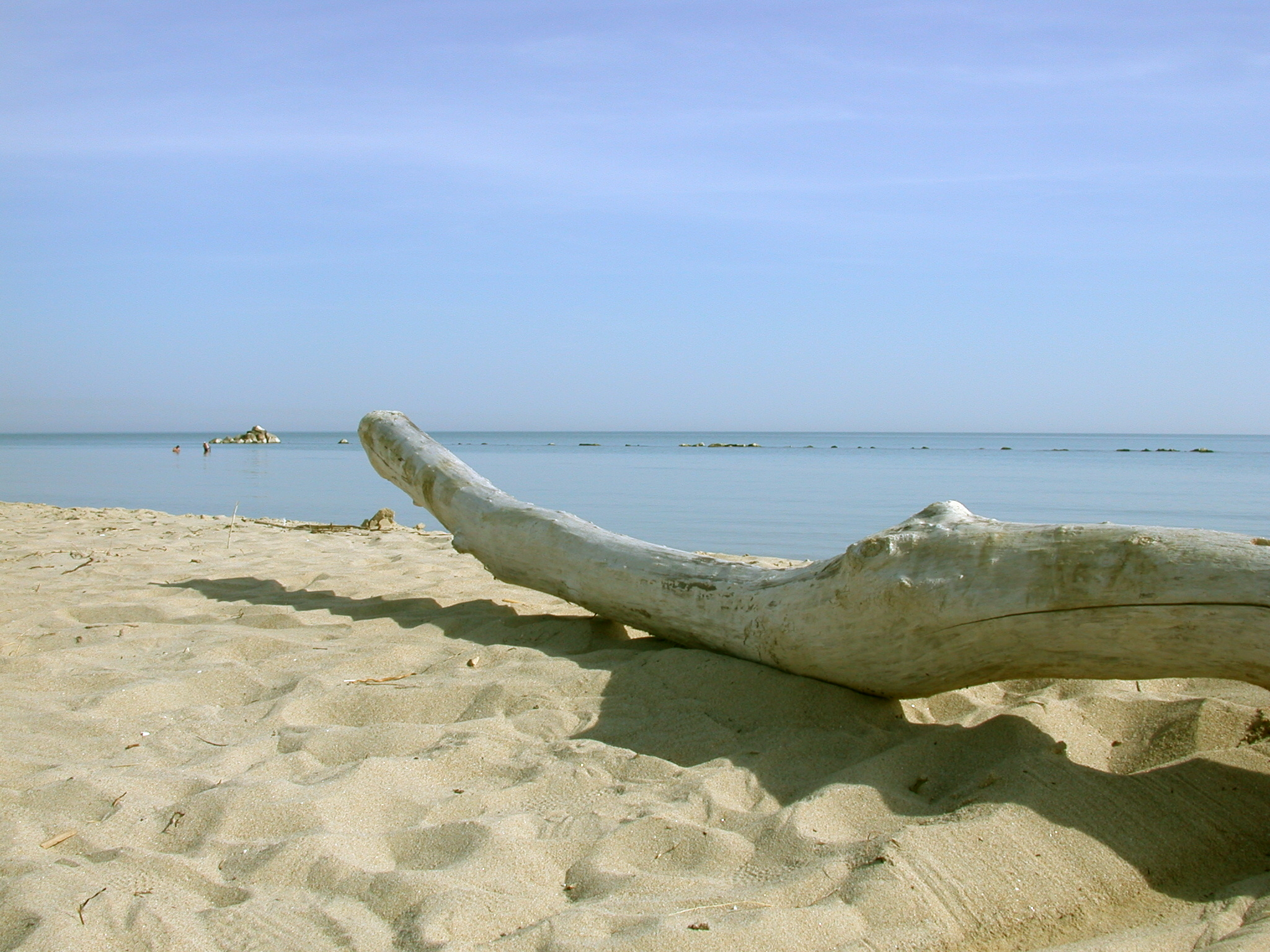
Petacciato Marina

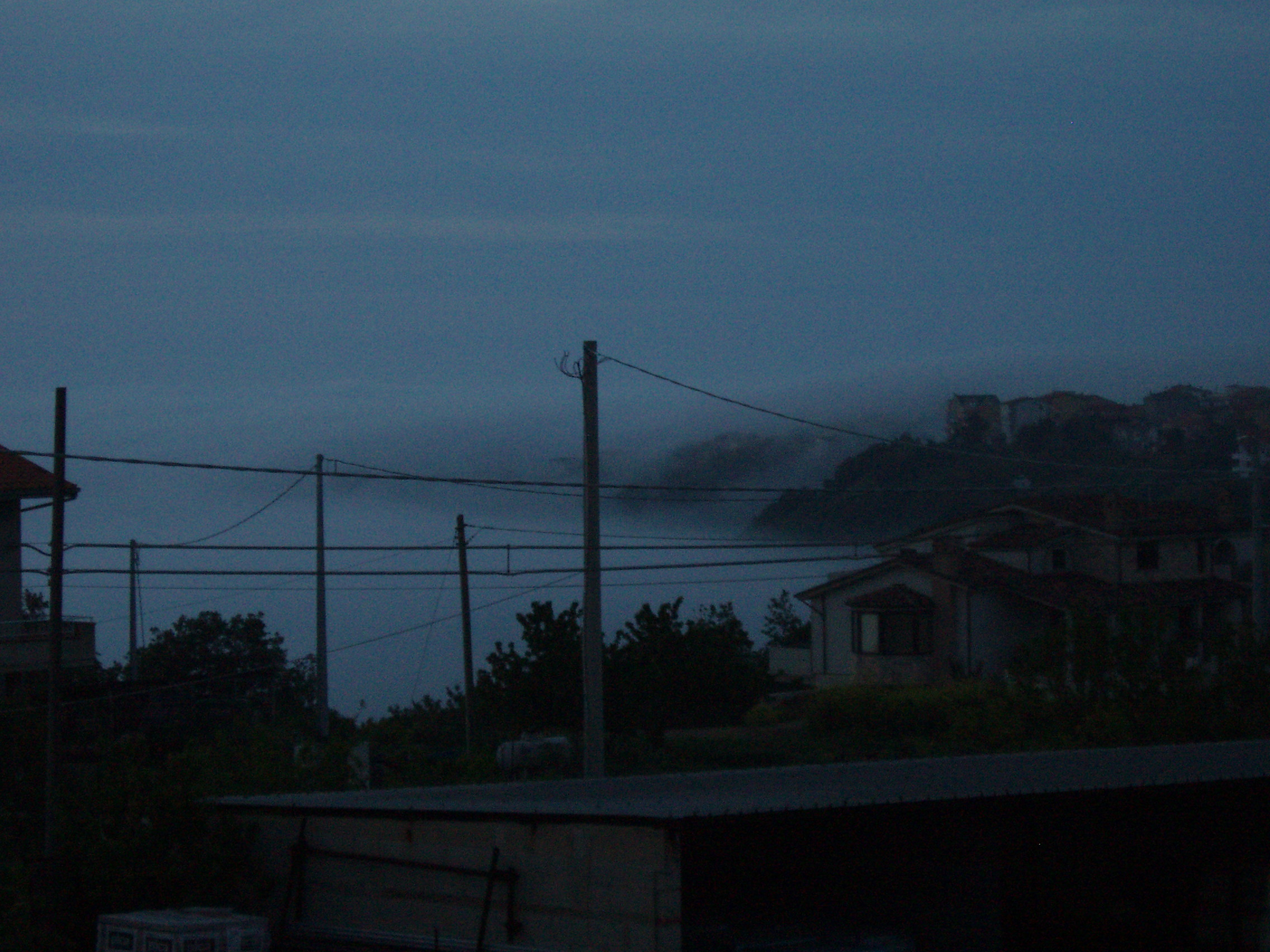
Sunset with fog in Petacciato

== Administration ==
Period		Office holder	Party	Title	Notes
9 June 2024	in office	Roberto Di Pardo	Civic list W Petacciato Viva	Mayor	

== See also ==
- Molise Croats
