= Heritage language =

Type of minority language of lower prestige

A heritage language is a minority language (either immigrant or indigenous) learned by its speakers at home as children, and difficult to be fully developed because of insufficient input from the social environment. The speakers grow up with a different dominant language in which they become more competent. Polinsky and Kagan label it as a continuum (taken from Valdés definition of heritage language) that ranges from fluent speakers to barely speaking individuals of the home language. In some countries or cultures which determine a person's mother tongue by the ethnic group they belong to, a heritage language would be linked to the native language.

The term can also refer to the language of a person's family or community that the person does not speak or understand, but identifies with culturally.

== Definitions and use ==
A heritage language is a language which is predominantly spoken by "nonsocietal" groups and linguistic minorities.

In various fields, such as foreign language education and linguistics, the definitions of heritage language become more specific and divergent. In foreign language education, heritage language is defined in terms of a student's upbringing and functional proficiency in the language: a student raised in a home where a non-majority language is spoken is a heritage speaker of that language if they possess some proficiency in it. Under this definition, individuals that have some cultural connection with the language but do not speak it are not considered heritage students. This restricted definition became popular in the mid 1990s with the publication of Standards for Foreign Language Learning by the American Council on the Teaching of Foreign Languages.

Among linguists, a heritage language is an end-state language that is defined based on the temporal order of acquisition and, often, the language dominance in the individual. A heritage speaker acquires the heritage language as their first language through natural input in the home environment and acquires the majority language as a second language, usually when they start school and talk about different topics with people in school, or by exposure through the media (such as written texts, the Internet, or popular culture). As exposure to the heritage language decreases and exposure to the majority language increases, the majority language becomes the individual’s dominant language and acquisition of the heritage language changes. The results of these changes can be seen in divergence of the heritage language from monolingual norms in the areas of phonology, lexical knowledge (knowledge of vocabulary or words), morphology, syntax, semantics and code-switching, although mastery of the heritage language may vary from purely receptive skills in only informal spoken language to native-like fluency.

=== Controversy in definition ===
As stated by Polinsky and Kagan: "The definition of a heritage speaker in general and for specific languages continues to be debated. The debate is of particular significance in such languages as Tamil, Chinese, Arabic, and languages of India and the Philippines, where speakers of multiple languages or dialects are seen as heritage speakers of a single standard language taught for geographic, cultural or other reasons (Mandarin Chinese, Modern Standard Arabic, Hindi, or Tagalog, respectively)."

One idea that prevails in the literature is that "[heritage] languages include indigenous languages that are often endangered. . . as well as world languages that are commonly spoken in many other regions of the world (Spanish in the United States, Arabic in France).” However, that view is not shared universally. In Canada, for example, First Nations languages are not classified as heritage languages by some groups whereas they are so classified by others.

The label heritage is given to a language based principally on the social status of its speakers and not necessarily on any linguistic property. Thus, while Spanish typically comes in second in terms of native speakers worldwide and has official status in a number of countries, it is considered a heritage language in the English-dominant United States and Canada. Outside the United States and Canada, heritage language definitions and usage vary.

Speakers of the same heritage language raised in the same community may differ significantly in terms of their language abilities, yet be considered heritage speakers under this definition. Some heritage speakers may be highly proficient in the language, possessing several registers, while other heritage speakers may be able to understand the language but not produce it. Other individuals who simply have a cultural connection with a minority language but do not speak it may consider it to be their heritage language. It is held by some that ownership does not necessarily depend on usership: "Some Aboriginal people distinguish between usership and ownership. There are even those who claim that they own a language although they only know one single word of it: its name."

== Proficiency ==
Heritage learners have a fluent command of the dominant language and are comfortable using it in formal setting because of their exposure to the language through formal education. Their command of the heritage language, however, varies widely. Some heritage learners may lose some fluency in the first language after they begin formal education in the dominant language. Others may use the heritage language consistently at home and with family but receive little or no formal training in the heritage language and thus may struggle with literacy skills or with using it in broader settings outside of the home. An additional factor that affects the acquisition of learners is whether they show willingness or reluctance towards learning the heritage language.

One factor that has been shown to influence the loss of fluency in the heritage language is age. Studies have shown that younger bilingual children are more susceptible to fluency loss than older bilingual children. The older the child is when the dominant language is introduced, the less likely they are to lose proficiency in their first language (the heritage language). This is because the older the child is, the more exposure and knowledge of use the child will have had with the heritage language, and thus the heritage language will remain as their primary language.

Researchers found that this phenomenon primarily deals with the memory network of an individual. Once a memory network is organized, it is difficult for the brain to reorganize information contrary to the initial information, because the previous information was processed first. This phenomenon becomes a struggle for adults who are trying to learn a different language. Once an individual has learned a language fluently, they will be heavily influenced by the grammatical rules and pronunciations of the first language they learned, while learning a new language.

An emerging effective way of measuring the proficiency of a heritage speaker is by speech rate. A study of gender restructuring in heritage Russian showed that heritage speakers fell into two groups: those who maintained the three-gender system and those who radically reanalyzed the system as a two-gender system. The heritage speakers who reanalyzed the three-gender system as a two-gender system had a strong correlation with a slower speech rate. The correlation is straightforward—lower proficiency speakers have more difficulty accessing lexical items; therefore, their speech is slowed down.

Although speech rate has been shown to be an effective way of measuring proficiency of heritage speakers, some heritage speakers are reluctant to produce any heritage language whatsoever. Lexical proficiency is an alternative method that is also effective in measuring proficiency. In a study with heritage Russian speakers, there was a strong correlation between the speaker's knowledge of lexical items (measured using a basic word list of about 200) and the speaker's control over grammatical knowledge such as agreement, temporal marking, and embedding.

Some heritage speakers explicitly study the language to gain additional proficiency. The learning trajectories of heritage speakers are markedly different from the trajectories of second language learners with little or no previous exposure to a target language. For instance, heritage learners typically show a phonological advantage over second language learners in both perception and production of the heritage language, even when their exposure to the heritage language was interrupted very early in life. Heritage speakers also tend to distinguish, rather than conflate, easily confusable sounds in the heritage language and the dominant language more reliably than second language learners. In morphosyntax as well, heritage speakers have been found to be more native-like than second language learners, although they are typically significantly different from native speakers. Many linguists frame this change in heritage language acquisition as "incomplete acquisition" or "attrition." "Incomplete acquisition," loosely defined by Montrul, is "the outcome of language acquisition that is not complete in childhood." In this incomplete acquisition, there are particular properties of the language that were not able to reach age-appropriate levels of proficiency after the dominant language has been introduced. Attrition, as defined by Montrul, is the loss of a certain property of a language after one has already mastered it with native-speaker level accuracy. These two cases of language loss have been used by Montrul and many other linguists to describe the change in heritage language acquisition. However, this is not the only viewpoint of linguists to describe heritage language acquisition.

One argument against incomplete acquisition is that the input that heritage speakers receive is different from monolinguals (the input may be affected by cross-generational attrition, among other factors), thus the comparison of heritage speakers against monolinguals is weak. This argument by Pascual and Rothman claims that the acquisition of the heritage language is therefore not incomplete, but complete and simply different from monolingual acquisition of a language. Another argument argues for a shift in focus on the result of incomplete acquisition of a heritage language to the process of heritage language acquisition. In this argument, the crucial factor in changes to heritage language acquisition is the extent to which the heritage speaker activates and processes the heritage language. This new model thus moves away from language acquisition that is dependent on the exposure to input of the language and moves towards dependence on the frequency of processing for production and comprehension of the heritage language.

Some colleges and universities offer courses prepared for speakers of heritage languages. For example, students who grow up learning some Spanish in the home may enroll in a course that will build on their Spanish abilities.

== See also ==
- Bilingualism
- Children of deaf adults
- Diaspora language
- Diglossia
- First language
- Heritage language learning
- Immigrant language
- Indigenous language
- Intangible cultural heritage
- Minority language
- Prestige language
- Saskatchewan Organization for Heritage Languages
- Semi-speakers
