= Montemitro =

Montemitro Mundimitar (Slavomolisano)
- Comune
- Comune di Montemitro
- Coat of arms
- Interactive map of Montemitro
- Location within Italy Location within Molise
- Coordinates: 41°53′N 14°39′E
- Country: Italy
- Region: Molise
- Province: Campobasso (CB)

Government
  - Mayor: Sergio Sammartino

Area
  - Total: 16.3 km^{2} (6.3 sq mi)
- Elevation: 508 m (1,667 ft)

Population (30 November 2017)
  - Total: 468
  - Density: 28.7/km^{2} (74.4/sq mi)
- Demonym: Montemitrani
- Time zone: UTC+1 (CET)
  - Summer (DST): UTC+2 (CEST)
- Postal code: 86030
- Dialing code: 0874
- Patron saint: St. Lucy
- Saint day: Last Friday of May
- Website: Official website

Montemitro (Slavomolisano: Mundimitar) is a small town and comune in the province of Campobasso in the Molise region of Italy, near the Trigno river.

Like Acquaviva Collecroce and San Felice del Molise, Montemitro is home to a community of Molisian Croats, most of whom speak a particular Slavomolisano dialect as well as Italian.

== Culture ==
Montemitro was granted an Honorary Consulate by Croatia.

The patron saint of Montemitro is Saint Lucia; the church dedicated to her is the church of Santa Lucia Vergine e Martire. However, the town does not celebrate the feast of Saint Lucia on its customary date (December 13), but rather on the first and last Fridays of May. This honors the crossing of the Adriatic Sea to Italy in the 15th century by the town's ancestors; they are believed to have carried a statue of Saint Lucia with them, arriving in Italy on a Friday in May.

The language of the three towns is considered an endangered diaspora language.

== See also ==
- Molise Croats
