= Risto Kovačić =

Hristifor "Risto" Kovačić (Risan, 22 May 1845 – Risan, 22 April 1909) was a historian and teacher. Kovačić's most important writings were on Serbian antiquities. There is much that is striking and original in his history of Serbs in Italy (Gli Slavi Serbi dell' Italia, 1885).

== Biography ==
Kovačić was baptised Hristifor (hence "Risto") in Risan in the tradition of his ancestral Herzegovinian adherents of the Serbian Orthodox Church. His patron saint was St. John the Baptist. After completing his high school education in Kotor, Dubrovnik and Zadar, he studied philosophy in Zagreb and Vienna. Upon graduation, he became a professor at a gymnasium in Kotor and at a Serbian Naval School in Herceg Novi, from 1867 until 1871 and again from 1880 to 1881. In 1883 he moved to Rome where he taught Slavistics until the end of his life.

He visited Molise in 1884 and wrote a report to Serbian Learned Society about Serbian settlements. In his report, published in 1885, he emphasized that there were nine Serbian settlements of as many as 16,000 people. In three settlements about 4,000 people still spoke Serbian and kept tradition of badnjak as their legacy.

The writings of both Risto Kovačić and Graziadio Isaia Ascoli concur with writer Giovanni de Rubertis who considered the Schiavoni (Slavs) or Dalmati (Dalmatians) of Molise in Italy to be the Serbs that were brought there by Skanderbeg during his Italian expedition in 1460—1462 along with the Albanians who settled in Calabria. He was a member of Serbian Learned Society since 30 January 1883.

He died at Risan on 22 April 1909.

== See also ==
- Medo Pucić
- Ignjat Job
- Ivan Stojanović
