= Račišće =

- Village
- Location within Croatia
- Country: Croatia
- County: Dubrovnik-Neretva County
- Municipality: Korčula

Area
  - Total: 2.2 sq mi (5.7 km^{2})

Population (2021)
  - Total: 379
  - Density: 170/sq mi (66/km^{2})
- Time zone: UTC+1 (CET)
  - Summer (DST): UTC+2 (CEST)

Račišće (pronounced [rǎtʃiːʃtɕɛ]) is a village on the island of Korčula, part of the Dubrovnik-Neretva county in Croatia.

== Geography ==
Korčula is an island in the southern half of Dalmatia, Račišće being located at the northern side of the island. The village is situated 12 kilometers west of the old town of Korčula. It is situated on 31 m above sea level.

== History ==
Račišće was established in the second half of the 17th century by refugees from Makarska, fleeing the Ottomans. In c. 1730 the island and village was settled by refugees from Herzegovina.

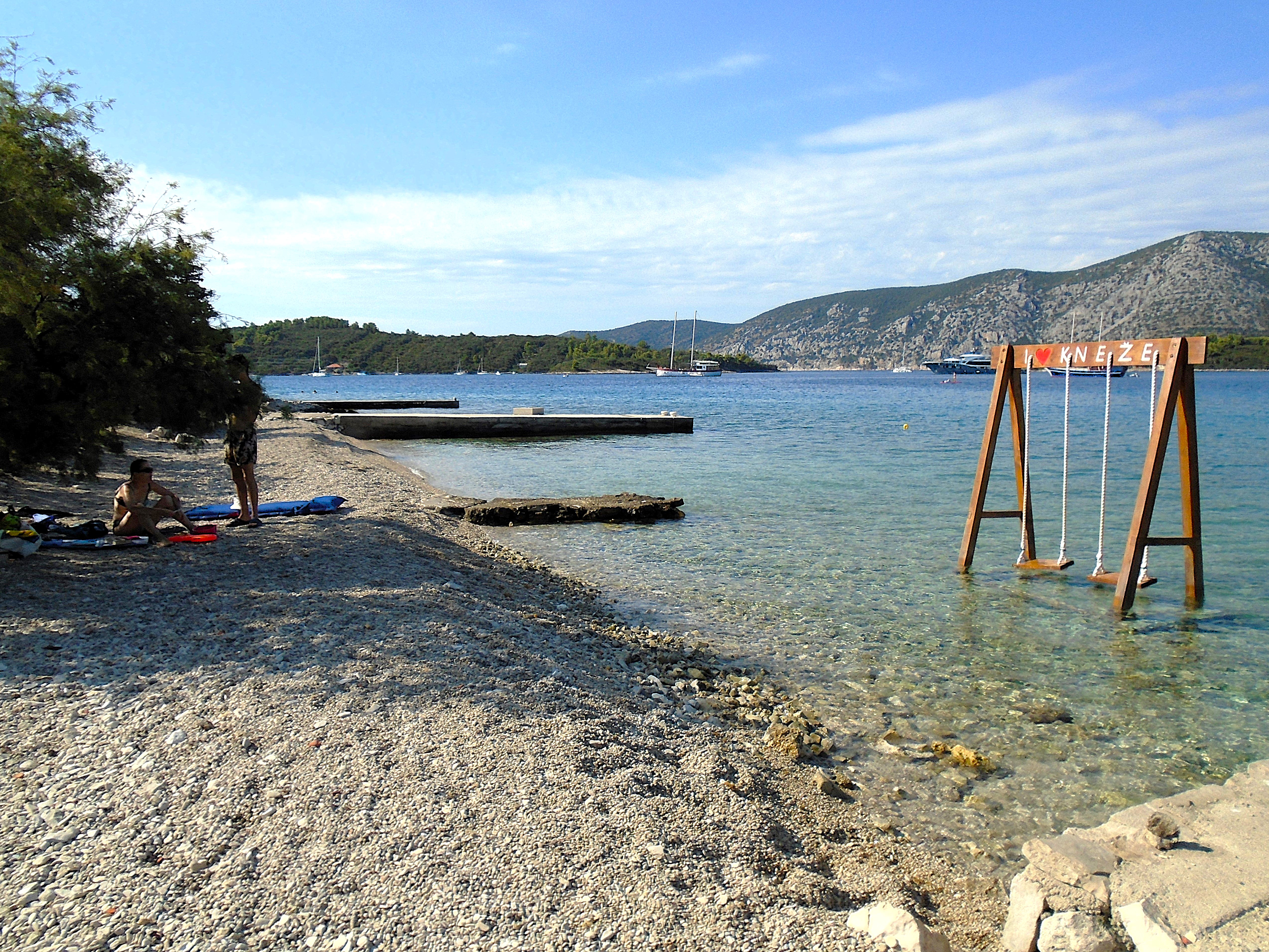
Kneže Beach near Račišće

== Churches ==
- Church of the Mother of God (Bogorodica), or Church of St. Blasius (Sv. Vlaho), with Baroque Loggia, built in 1682
- Church of St. Nicholas (Sv. Nikola), built in the 19th century

== Demographics ==
According to the 2021 census, its population was 379. According to the 2001 census it had a population of 477.
