= Acquaviva Collecroce =

Acquaviva Collecroce Živavoda Kruč (Slavomolisano)
- Comune
- Comune di Acquaviva Collecroce
- Interactive map of Acquaviva Collecroce
- Location within Italy Location within Molise
- Coordinates: 41°52′N 14°45′E
- Country: Italy
- Region: Molise
- Province: Campobasso (CB)

Government
  - Mayor: Francesco Trolio

Area
  - Total: 28.6 km^{2} (11.0 sq mi)
- Elevation: 425 m (1,394 ft)

Population (30 November 2017)
  - Total: 644
  - Density: 22.5/km^{2} (58.3/sq mi)
- Demonym: Acquavivesi
- Time zone: UTC+1 (CET)
  - Summer (DST): UTC+2 (CEST)
- Postal code: 86030
- Dialing code: 0875
- Patron saint: St. Michael Archangel
- Saint day: 29 September
- Website: Official website

Acquaviva Collecroce (Slavomolisano: Živavoda Kruč or Kruč) is a small town and comune in the province of Campobasso, in the Molise region of southern Italy, between the Biferno and Trigno rivers.

Like the smaller towns of Montemitro and San Felice del Molise, Acquaviva Collecroce is home to a community of Molisian Croats, most of whom speak a particular Slavomolisano dialect as well as Italian. There are differences in the dialects of the three towns, but they all descend from the Shtokavian-Ikavian dialect of Dalmatia. The language is considered an endangered diaspora language.

Acquaviva is known for the cultivation of small, dark, zerniza figs, as well as fennel and white celery.

== History ==
In the 12th century, Acquaviva was a base for the Knights of Malta.

Though there is evidence of an earlier Slavic settlement in 1297, it is believed that the current inhabitants are not their descendants, but rather come from later migrations in the 15th and 16th centuries. These migrations may have been caused by Ottoman incursions into the Balkans.

Numerous inhabitants emigrated in two flows during the 20th century, and population is currently still decreasing (there were some 2,500 inhabitants in 1951, compared to the c. 730 of 2007). The first emigration took place between, roughly, 1900–1920, the emigres heading towards the United States and Argentina. The second major flow took place in the 1950s, chiefly to Australia.

== Culture ==
Every 1 May, the town celebrates the Festa del Maja by parading a puppet (the pagliara maja) as a good omen for the harvest.

== See also ==
- Molise Croats
- Santa Maria Ester
