= San Felice del Molise =

San Felice del Molise Filić (Slavomolisano)
- Comune
- Comune di San Felice del Molise
- Coat of arms
- Interactive map of San Felice del Molise
- Location within Italy Location within Molise
- Coordinates: 41°53′N 14°42′E
- Country: Italy
- Region: Molise
- Province: Campobasso (CB)

Government
  - Mayor: Fausto Bellucci

Area
  - Total: 24.24 km^{2} (9.36 sq mi)
- Elevation: 546 m (1,791 ft)

Population (30 November 2017)
  - Total: 620
  - Density: 26/km^{2} (66/sq mi)
- Demonym: Sanfeliciani
- Time zone: UTC+1 (CET)
  - Summer (DST): UTC+2 (CEST)
- Postal code: 86030
- Dialing code: 0874
- Saint day: St. Felix
- Website: Official website

San Felice del Molise (Slavomolisano: Filić or Štifilić) is a small town and comune in the province of Campobasso in the Molise region of Italy, near the Trigno river.

Like Acquaviva Collecroce and Montemitro, San Felice del Molise is home to a community of Molisian Croats, most of whom speak the Slavomolisano dialect as well as Italian and Molisan.

Main sights include the Norman Chapel of S. Felice and the church of Santa Maria di Costantinopoli.

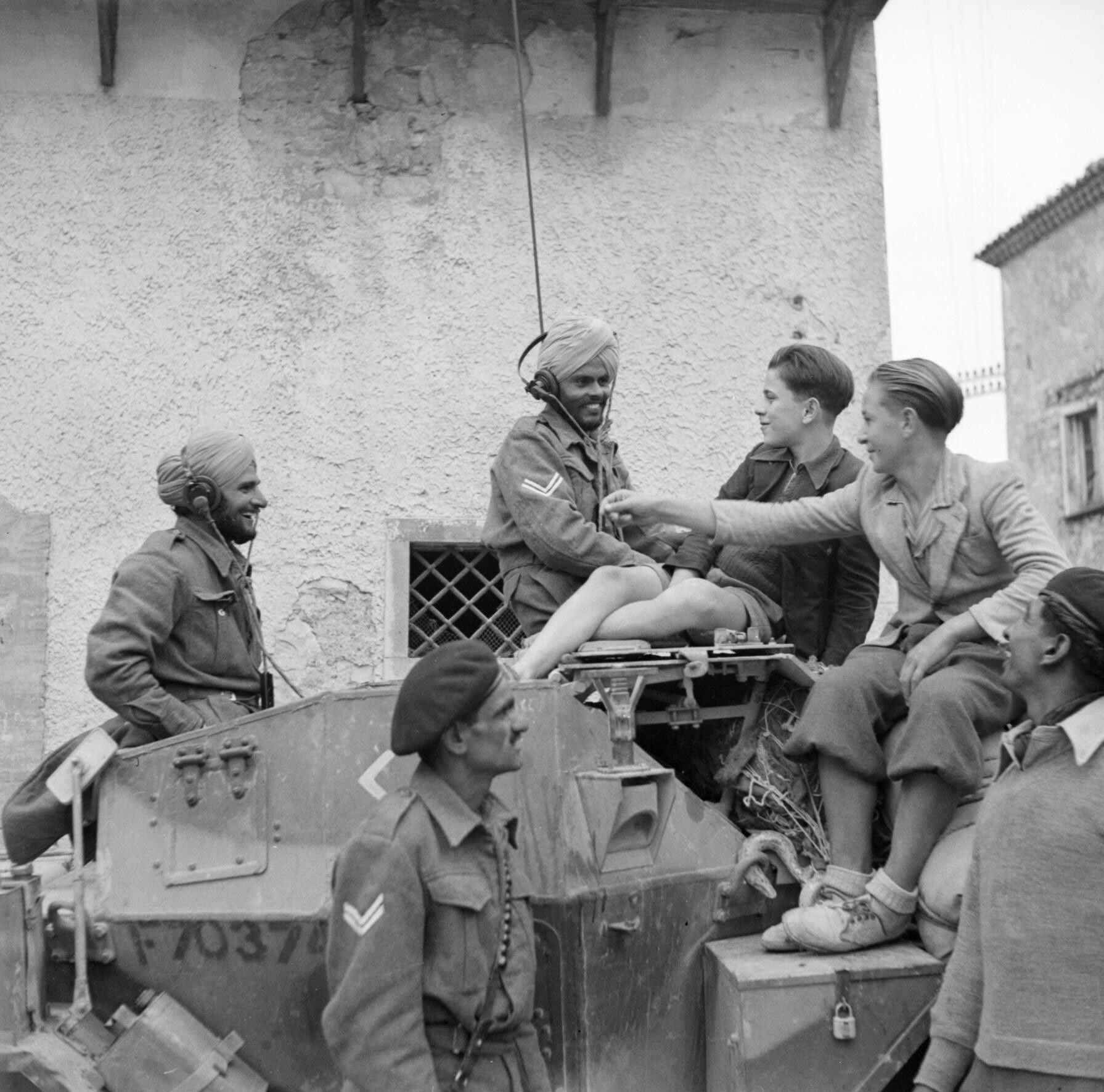
6th DCO Lancers, San Felice, during the advance towards the Sangro

== See also ==
- Molise Croats

== International relations ==
San Felice del Molise is twinned with:

- Omiš, Croatia
