= Razlog dialect =

Dialect of Bulgarian

The Razlog dialect is a Bulgarian dialect, member of the Rup dialects. Its range includes the valley of Razlog in southwestern Bulgaria and its immediate neighbours are the Rup Serres-Nevrokop dialect to the south, the Babyak dialect to the east, the Samokov and Ihtiman dialects to the north and the Blagoevgrad-Petrich dialect to the west. It shares a number of phonological characteristics with both the Rup (especially the Rhodopean) and the Southwestern dialects. This is the dialect through which the Bulgarian language became known to modern science, because in 1822 the creator of the modern Serbian language Vuk Karadžić published in Vienna Dodatak k sankpeterburgskim sravnitelnim rijechnicima sviju jezika i narijechija s osobitom ogledom Bugarskog jezika; ("An addition to the St. Petersburg comparative dictionaries of all languages and dialects with a particular sample of the Bulgarian language"), in which are placed 273 words, a short grammar, 27 folk songs and 2 chapters of the gospel, which he wrote and said to him pravi bugarin iz Razloga; ("a real Bulgarian from Razlog").

== Phonological and morphological characteristics ==
- Broad e (æ) for Old Bulgarian yat in a stressed syllable and ordinary e (ɛ) in an unstressed syllable (as in the Rhodopean Chepino dialect): бæл/бæли vs. formal Bulgarian бял/бели (white) but деца as in Standard Bulgarian (children).
- Broad e (æ) for Old Bulgarian я in all positions (as in the Rhodopean Smolyan and Hvoyna dialect): вунæ vs. formal Bulgarian воня (stink)
- Vowel a for Old Bulgarian big yus ѫ and back yer ъ (as in the neighbouring Samokov and Ihtiman dialects to the north and the Dorkovo subdialect of the Rhodopean Chepino dialect to the east): зап vs. Standard Bulgarian зъп (tooth), даж'до vs. Standard Bulgarian дъж'дът (the rain)
- Schwa (ə) for Old Church Slavonic лъ/ль (as in most Southwestern dialects): съза vs. formal Bulgarian сълза (tear)
- Moderate vowel reduction, as in the rest of the Rup dialects and Standard Bulgarian
- The masculine definite article is о (in a stressed syllable) and у (in an unstressed syllable) as in the Moesian dialects, compared to formal Bulgarian –ът/ъ (гърˈбо, ˈстолу vs. гърˈбът, ˈстолът). However, after a historically soft consonant, the article is e (cf. a similar trait in the Rup Strandzha dialect): дене vs. formal Bulgarian ден'ъ(т) (the day), коне vs. formal Bulgarian кон'ъ(т) (the horse). The masculine definite article for adjectives is -йъ as in Standard Bulgarian: гулæмийъ (the big one)
- Dynamic stress (as in Standard Bulgarian): маж/ма'же vs. formal Bulgarian мъж/мъ'жъ(т) (the man)
- Lack of ending -т in the forms for 3rd person pl. present tense: яда vs. formal Bulgarian ядът (they eat)

For other phonological and morphological characteristics typical for all Rup or Rhodopean dialects, cf. Rup dialects.

== Noteworthy ==
- The first grammatical treatise of Modern Bulgarian published by Serbian scholar Vuk Karadzic in 1822 (Додатак к санктпетербургским сравнитељним pjeчницима свиjу jезика и нaрjечиjа c особитим огледом Бугарског jезика) is based on the grammatical and morphological characteristics of the Razlog dialect
- The first full grammar of Modern Bulgarian published by Bulgarian scholar Neofit Rilski in 1835 (Болгарска граматика) is also based on the grammatical and morphological characteristics of the Razlog dialect

== Sources ==
- Стойков, Стойко: Българска диалектология, Акад. изд. "Проф. Марин Дринов", 2006
