= Slavic dialects of Greece =

Dialects of Macedonian and Bulgarian

Traditional non-Greek languages zones in Greece. Greek is the dominant language throughout Greece; inclusion in a non-Greek language zone does not necessarily imply that the relevant minority language is still spoken there.

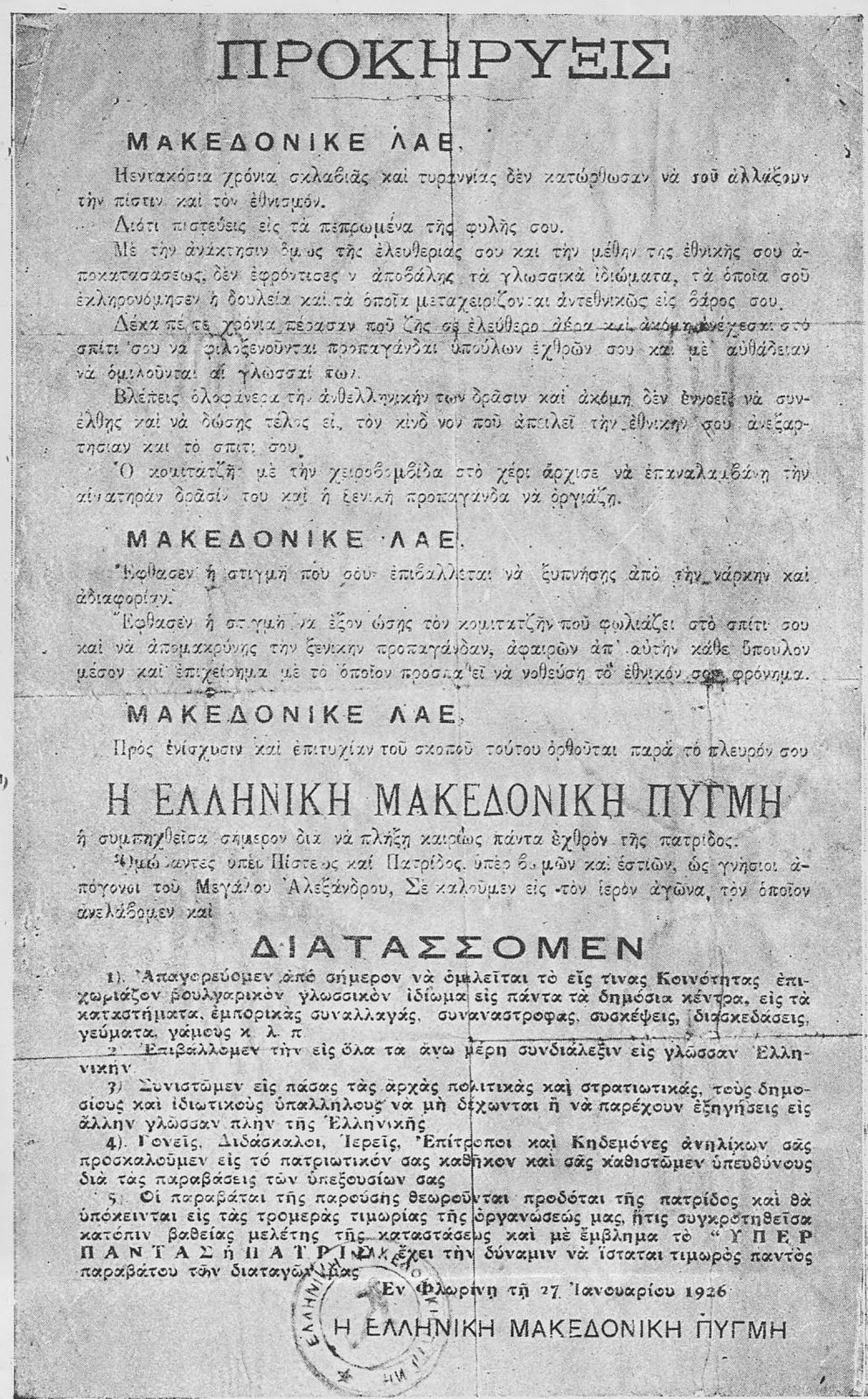
Proclamation of Greek nationalists from 1926, per which the Bulgarian language is forbidden for the locals

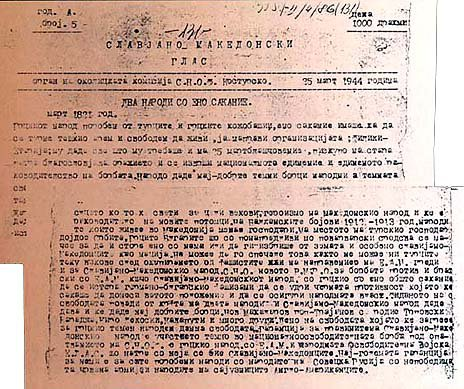
Slavomacedonian voice newspaper from March 25, 1944. The newspaper was published in a non-standardized Kostur dialect by the Slavomacedonian National Liberation Front during the WWII.

Eastern South Slavic dialects of Macedonian and Bulgarian are spoken by minority groups in the regions of Macedonia and Thrace in northern Greece. Usually, dialects in Thrace are classified as Bulgarian, while the dialects in Macedonia are classified as Macedonian, with the exception of some eastern dialects which can also be classified as Bulgarian.

== Greek Macedonia ==
The continuum of Macedonian and Bulgarian is spoken in the prefectures of Florina and Pella, and to a lesser extent in Kastoria, Imathia, Kilkis, Thessaloniki, Serres and Drama.

According to Riki van Boeschoten, the Slavic dialects of Greek Macedonia are divided into three main dialects (Eastern, Central and Western), of which the Eastern dialect is used in the areas of Serres and Drama, and is closest to Bulgarian, the Western dialect is used in Florina and Kastoria, and is closest to Macedonian, the Central dialect is used in the area between Edessa and Salonica and is an intermediate between Macedonian and Bulgarian. Trudgill classifies certain peripheral dialects in the far east of Greek Macedonia as part of the Bulgarian language area and the rest as Macedonian dialects. Victor Friedman considers those Macedonian dialects, particularly those spoken as west as Kilkis, to be transitional to the neighbouring South Slavic language.

Bulgarian dialectologists claim all dialects and do not recognize Macedonian. They divide Bulgarian dialects mainly into Eastern and Western by a separating isogloss (dyado, byal/dedo, bel "grandpa, white"(m., sg.)) stretching from Thessaloniki to the meeting point of Iskar and Danube.

The nasal vowels are absent in all Slavic dialects except for the dialects of Macedonian in Greece and the Lechitic dialects (Polabian, Slovincian, Polish and Kashubian). This, along with the preservation of the paroxitonic in the Kostur dialect and Polish, is part of a series of isoglosses shared with the Lechitic dialects, which led to the thesis of a genetic relationship between Proto-Bulgarian and Proto-Macedonian with Proto-Polish and Proto-Kashubian.

The Old Church Slavonic language, the earliest recorded Slavic language, was based on the dialects in Thessaloniki. Church Slavonic, long-used as a state language further north in East and West Slavic states and as the only one in Wallachia and Moldavia until the 18th century, influenced other Slavic languages on all levels, including morphonology and vocabulary. About 70% of Church Slavonic words are common to all Slavic languages.

=== Fringe views ===
A series of ethnological and pseudo-linguistic works were published by three Greek teachers, notably Giorgos Boukouvalas and Konstantinos Tsioulkas, whose publications demonstrate common ideological and methodological similarities. They published etymological lists tracing every single Slavic word to Ancient Greek with fictional correlations, and they were ignorant of the dialects and the Slavic languages entirely. Among them, Boukouvalas promoted an enormous influence of the Greek language on a Bulgarian idiom and a discussion about their probable Greek descent. Tsioulkas followed him by publishing a large book, where he "proved" through an "etymological" approach, that these idioms are a pure Ancient Greek dialect. A publication of the third teacher followed, Giorgos Georgiades, who presented the language as a mixture of Greek, Turkish and other loanwords, but was incapable of defining the dialects as either Greek or Slav.

Serbian dialectology does not usually extend the Serbian dialects to Greek Macedonia, but an unconventional classification has been made by Aleksandar Belić, a convinced Serbian nationalist, who regarded the dialects as Serbian. In his classification he distinguished three categories of dialects in Greek Macedonia: a Serbo-Macedonian dialect, a Bulgaro-Macedonian territory where Serbian is spoken and a Non-Slavic territory.

=== Ban on use, language shift and language death ===
After the conclusion of the First World War, a widespread policy of Hellenisation was implemented in the Greek region of Macedonia. Personal and topographic names were forcibly changed to their Greek versions. Cyrillic inscriptions across Northern Greece were removed from gravestones and churches. Under the regime of Ioannis Metaxas, a law was passed banning the Bulgarian language. Many people who broke the rule were deported, or arrested, and beaten. During the Cold War cases of discrimination against people who spoke in local dialects had been reported. In 1959 the inhabitants of three villages adopted a 'language oath', renouncing their Slavic dialect on the initiative of local government officials. After the fall of Communism the issue has continued. In 1994 report by the Human Rights Watch, Greece implemented a program, which refuses the teaching of any Slavic language. The Greek state continues to exclude the Slavic speakers of Greek Macedonia from operating TV, or radio-stations in local Slavic. Per Slavist Christian Voss, the region had the typical situation of language shift and decreased proficiency from the Slavic vernacular to Greek as follows: "Households with almost monoglot Slavic-speaking grandparents, bilingual parents, and monoglot Greek-speaking children with a passive knowledge of Slavic." He wrote that the threat of language death in Eastern Macedonia and partly Central Macedonia was because 90% of the villages in Eastern Macedonia and 66% of the villages in Central Macedonia were affected by a huge wave of refugees during the 1920s.

== Greek Thrace ==
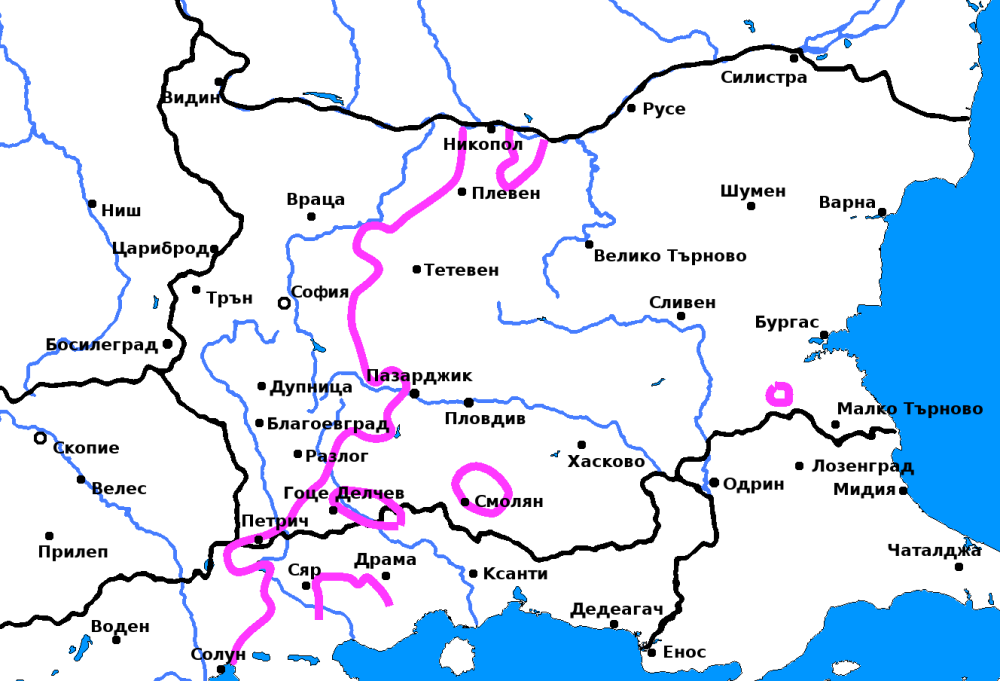
The yat (*ě) split in the Eastern South Slavic. Jouko Lindstedt has assumed that this isogloss is the dividing line between Bulgarian and Macedonian.

Some of the Rup dialects of the Bulgarian language are spoken by the Pomaks in Western Thrace in Greece. These dialects are native also in Bulgaria, and are classified as part of the Smolyan subdialect. Not all Pomaks speak this dialect as their mother language. It is generally qualified by Bulgarian researchers as an "archaic dialect" with some conservative features, which bear witness to an intermediate state of transition from Old Bulgarian/Old Church Slavonic to the modern Bulgarian language.

== Attempts of codification ==
=== Greek governmental codification ===
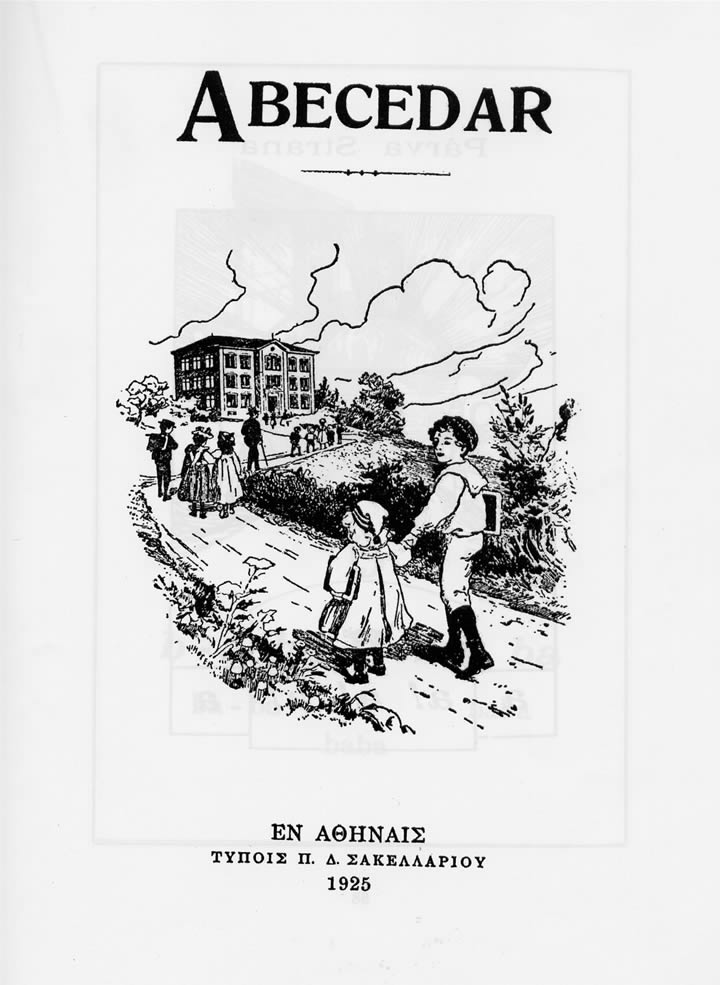
Front page of the original Abecedar, published in 1925

Under the 1920 Treaty of Sèvres, Greece had agreed to open schools for minority-language children. In September 1924 Greece also agreed to a protocol with Bulgaria to place its Slavic-speaking minority under the protection of the League of Nations as Bulgarians. However, the Greek parliament refused to ratify the protocol due to objections from Serbia, and from Greeks who considered the Slavic-speakers to be Greeks rather than Slavic people. Vasilis Dendramis, the Greek representative in the League of the Nations, stated that the Macedonian Slav language was neither Bulgarian, nor Serbian, but an independent language. The Greek government went ahead with the publication in May 1925 of the Abecedar, described by contemporary Greek writers as a primer for "the children of Slav speakers in Greece ... printed in the Latin script and compiled in the Macedonian dialect." The book's publication sparked controversy in Greek Macedonia, along with Bulgaria and Serbia. The Bulgarians and Serbs objected to the book being printed in Latin alphabet. In January 1926, the region of Florina saw extensive protests by Greek and pro-Greek Slavic speakers campaigning against the primer's publication, demanding the government change its policies on minority education. As a result, although some books reached villages in Greek Macedonia, it was never used in their schools.

=== Greek communists' codification ===
Primer published by the Greek communist publisher Nea Ellada in Bucharest (1949)

A textbooks in Pomak language printed in 2004 in Greece

After the Tito–Stalin split in 1948, under the auspices of some Macedonian intellectuals in Bucharest, anti-Yugoslav alphabet, grammar, and primer closer to Bulgarian, purported to be "purified" of the Serbo-Croatian loanwords of the "language of Skopje" were created. The Communist Party of Greece led by Nikos Zahariadis took the side of the Cominform. After the defeat of communists in the Greek Civil War in 1949, a hunt for Titoist spies began in the midst of Greek political immigrants - civil war refugees, living in socialist countries in Eastern Europe. As a result, the Greek communist publisher "Nea Ellada" issued a Macedonian grammar (1952) and developed a different alphabet. Between 1952 and 1956, the Macedonian Department of Nea Hellas published a number of issues in this literary standard, officially called "Macedonian language of the Slavomacedonians from Greek or Aegean Macedonia". This failed attempt of codification included the Ъ, Ь, Ю, Я, Й and was proclaimed as "non-serbianised." However, it was merely a form of Bulgarian. This codification did not gain widespread acceptance. The Soviet-Yugoslav rapprochement from the mid-1950s probably helped to put this codification to an end. The grammar was prepared by a team headed by Atanas Peykov. Atanas Peykov himself came to Romania from Bulgaria, where until 1951 he had worked at the Informbureau of Hellas Press. The Aegean Macedonian norm made some Aegean emigrants unable to adopt the Macedonian standard language in Yugoslavia, where many of them settled.

==== Communist refugees from Greece in Australia ====
The Macedonian Greek Civil War refugees in Australia issued a Makedonska Iskra (Macedonian Spark). It was the first Macedonian newspaper published in Australia, from 1946 to 1957. The Makedonska Iskra was also thrown into confusion by the expulsion of Yugoslavia from the Cominform. The newspaper was printed in the Latin alphabet. Its articles were not in standard Macedonian but in local Slavic dialects of Greece. Some of the Slavic texts were in mixed Bulgaro-Macedonian language or were written in Bulgarian language. A monthly with national distribution, it commenced in Perth and later moved to Melbourne and Sydney.

=== Pomak language ===
In Greece, attempts to write the Pomak language in formal publications have been criticized because their script, whether it was in Greek or in Latin. Since the 1990s several publications in Pomak dialect have been issued using either script. Some criticisms to these publications were related to their funding sources. For example, by the cases using the Greek script, two volumes of a textbooks were printed in 2004. Their author was Nikos Kokkas and publisher Pakethra. Its funding was provided by a Greek businessman and directly through his company. The preface of a Pomak primer presents it as one of the "lesser-spoken languages" of Europe. The use of Pomak in writing is very limited. It is even not used in the local Pomak newspaper "Zagalisa", that is published in Greek. Recently, the use of Pomak is preferred in a new local newspaper "Natpresh". Pomak is not being actively promoted by either Pomak communities or by Greek authorities. The result is a strong language shift in Greece towards Turkish.

== Features ==
Comparison of the Slavic dialects of Greece with Standard Macedonian and Bulgarian

Proto Slavic	Old Church Slavonic	Standard Macedonian	Lower Prespa dialect	Lerin dialect	Kostur dialect	Nestram-Kostenar dialect	Solun-Kukuš-Voden dialect	Lagadin-Ser-Drama dialect	Pomak dialect of Komotini	Bulgarian
tʲ	št/щ (ʃt)	kj/ќ (c) леќa/lekja	št/щ (ʃt) лещa/lešta	št/щ or šč/шч (ʃt/ʃtʃ) лещa/ lešta	šč/шч (ʃtʃ) лешчa/lešča	šč/шч (ʃtʃ) лешчa/lešča	št/щ (ʃt) лещa/ lešta	št/щ (ʃt) лещa/ lešta	št/щ (ʃt) лещa/lešta	št/щ (ʃt) лещa/lešta
dʲ	žd/жд (ʒd)	gj/ѓ (ɟ) меѓу/megju	žd/жд (ʒd) между/meždu	žd/жд (ʒd) между/meždu	ž/ж (ʒ) межу/mežu	ždž/жџ (ʒdʒ) межджу/meždžu	žd/жд (ʒd) между/meždu	žd/жд (ʒd) между/meždu	žd/жд (ʒd) между/meždu	žd/жд (ʒd) между/meždu
gd/kt	št/щ (ʃt)	kj/ќ (c) ноќ/nokj	š(t)/ш(щ)(ʃ/ʃt) нош/noš	(j)kj/(ј)ќ (c) но(ј)ќ/no(j)kj	š(č)/ш(ч) (ʃ/ʃtʃ) and gj/ѓ (ɟ) нош/noš	š(ч)/ш(ч)(ʃ/ʃtʃ' and jk/jк (k) нош/noš	(j)kj/(ј)ќ (c) and (j)gj/(ј)ѓ (ɟ) но(ј)ќ/no(j)kj or но(ј)ѓ/no(j)gj	št/щ (ʃt) нощ/nošt	š/ш(ʃ) нош/noš	št/щ (ʃt) нощ/nošt
Yat	Ѣ, ѣ (ja)	e (ɛ) бел/бели	e (ɛ) бел/бели	e (ɛ) бел/бели	e (ɛ) бел/бели	e (ɛ) бел/бели	e (ɛ) бел/бели бæл/бæли (Solun)	ја/е (ʲa/ɛ) бял/бели sometimes ја/æ (ʲa/æ) бял/бæли (Drama region)	æ (æ) бæл/бæли	ја/е (ʲa/ɛ) бял/бели
Yus	Ѫ, ѫ (ɔ̃) and Ѧ, ѧ (ɛ̃)	а (a) маж/maž, заб/zab	а (a) маж/maž, заб/zab	а (a) sometimes ъ (ə) (Southern region) маж/maž, заб/zab/ зъб/zəb мъж/məʒ	ăn/ън (ən), ôn/ôн, ôm/ôм (ɒn/m)before voiced stops мъж/măž, зъмб/zămb мôж/môž, зôмб/zômb	ăm/ъм (əm), em/ем (em), ôn/ôн, ôm/ôм (ɒn/m) мъж/măž, зъмб/zămb мôж/môž, зôмб/zômb	ă/ъ (ə) sometimes ън (ən) (Solun region) мъnж/mănž, зънб/zănb мънж/mănž, зънб/zănb	ăn/ън (ə) мънж/mănž, зънб/zănb	o (ɔ) мoж/mož, зoб//zob	ă/ъ (ə) мъж/măž, зъб/zăb
Yer	ъ (ə)	о (ɔ) волк/volk	о (ɔ) волк/volk	ъ (ə), ъл (əл) вък/vək / (Southeastern region) вълк/vălk	ъ (ə) вълк/vəlk	ǒ (ô) / â (â) вôлк/vôlk вâлк/vâlk	о (ɔ), ъ (ə) (Solun region) волк/volk вълк/vălk	ă/ъ (ə) вълк/vălk	о (ɔ) волк/volk	ă/ъ (ə) вълк/vălk

== See also ==
- Centre for the Macedonian Language in Greece
- Eastern South Slavic
- Fallmerayer's Greek theory
- Grammatical aspect in the Slavic languages

== Bibliography ==
- Trudgill P. (2000) "Greece and European Turkey: From Religious to Linguistic Identity" in Language and Nationalism in Europe (Oxford: Oxford University Press)
- Iakovos D. Michailidis (1996) "Minority Rights and Educational Problems in Greek Interwar Macedonia: The Case of the Primer 'Abecedar'". Journal of Modern Greek Studies 14.2 329–343
