= Babyak dialect =

Dialect of Bulgarian

The Babyak dialect is a Bulgarian dialect, member of the Rup or Southeastern Bulgarian dialects. It is spoken in several mountainous villages on the western fringes of the Rhodopes and is thus sandwiched between the Chepino dialect on the east and northeast and the Razlog dialect to the south and west. It shares a number of phonological characteristics with both the Rup (especially the Rhodopean) and the Southwestern dialects. Because of its specific reflexes of Old Church Slavonic yat, it is generally classified as a Rup dialect but is actually transitional between the two dialectal groups.

== Phonological and morphological characteristics ==
- Broad e (æ) for Old Church Slavonic yat in all positions and regardless of the word stress and the character of the following syllable: бæл/бæли vs. formal Bulgarian бял/бели (white), гол'æм/гол'æми vs. formal Bulgarian голям/големи (big). This is a feature the Babyak dialect shares with the Rhodopean dialects, and especially with the Smolyan and Hvoyna dialects
- Vowel a for Old Church Slavonic big yus ѫ and little yus ѧ (as in the neighbouring Samokov and Ihtiman dialects to the north and the Dorkovo subdialect of the Rhodopean Chepino dialect to the east): зап vs. Standard Bulgarian зъп (tooth), даж'до vs. Standard Bulgarian дъж'дът (the rain)
- ɛ for Old Church Slavonic little yus (ѧ) - as in Standard Bulgarian
- Single masculine definite article -o (as in the neighbouring Samokov dialect to the north): гар'бо vs. Standard Bulgarian гър'бът (the back).

For other phonological and morphological characteristics typical for all Rup or Rhodopean dialects, cf. Rup dialects.

== Sources ==
- Стойков, Стойко: Българска диалектология, Акад. изд. "Проф. Марин Дринов", 2006
