= Geographical distribution of Macedonian speakers =

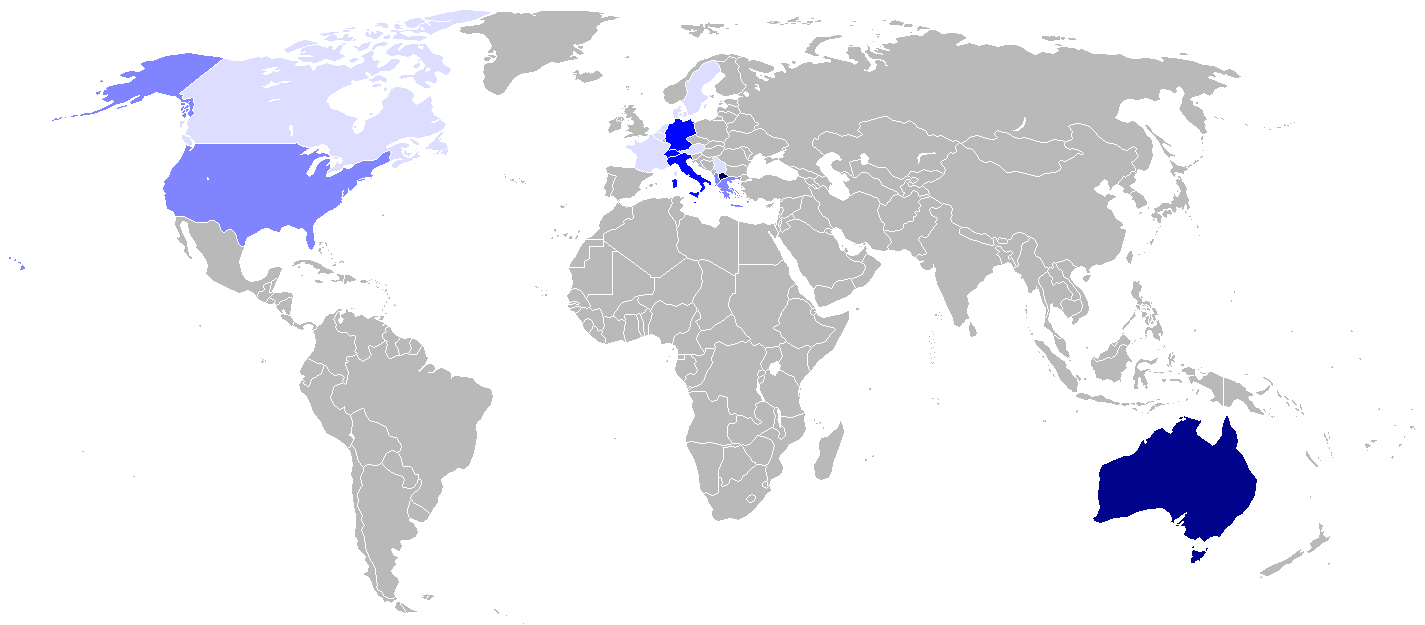
Distribution of Macedonian speakers across the world: official language, approximately 2 million speakers — North Macedonia; approximately 70,000 speakers — Australia; more than 50,000 speakers — Germany, Italy, Switzerland; more than 20,000 speakers Albania (contested), Greece (contested), United States; approximately 10,000 speakers — Austria, Belgium, Denmark, Canada, Netherlands, Serbia, France, Sweden; less than 10,000. speakers — other countries

The geographical distribution of speakers of Macedonian refers to the total number of native speakers of Macedonian, an East South Slavic language that serves as the official language of North Macedonia. Estimates of the number of native and second language speakers of Macedonian varies; the number of native speakers in the country ranges from 1,344,815 according to the 2002 census in North Macedonia to 1,476,500 per linguistic database Ethnologue in 2016. Estimates of the total number of speakers in the world include 3.5 million people. Macedonian is studied and spoken as a second language by all ethnic minorities in the country.

Outside of the country, Macedonian is spoken as a native language by migrant communities throughout the Balkan Peninsula, predominantly by Macedonians who live in the geographical region of Macedonia and post-Yugoslav countries. The actual number of Macedonian native and second language speakers in the region of Macedonia is difficult to establish due to political policies of Greece, Bulgaria and Albania. Several Macedonian dialects are also considered dialects of the Serbian or Bulgarian language, which further hinders establishing the number of native speakers of Macedonian.

Macedonian is also spoken in continental Europe, predominantly in countries of Western and Northern Europe. Other speakers can also be found in the rest of the world, predominantly Australia, Canada and the United States. A 1964 estimate of the emigrant population put the number of Macedonian speakers outside the Balkans at approximately 580,000 people.

== North Macedonia ==
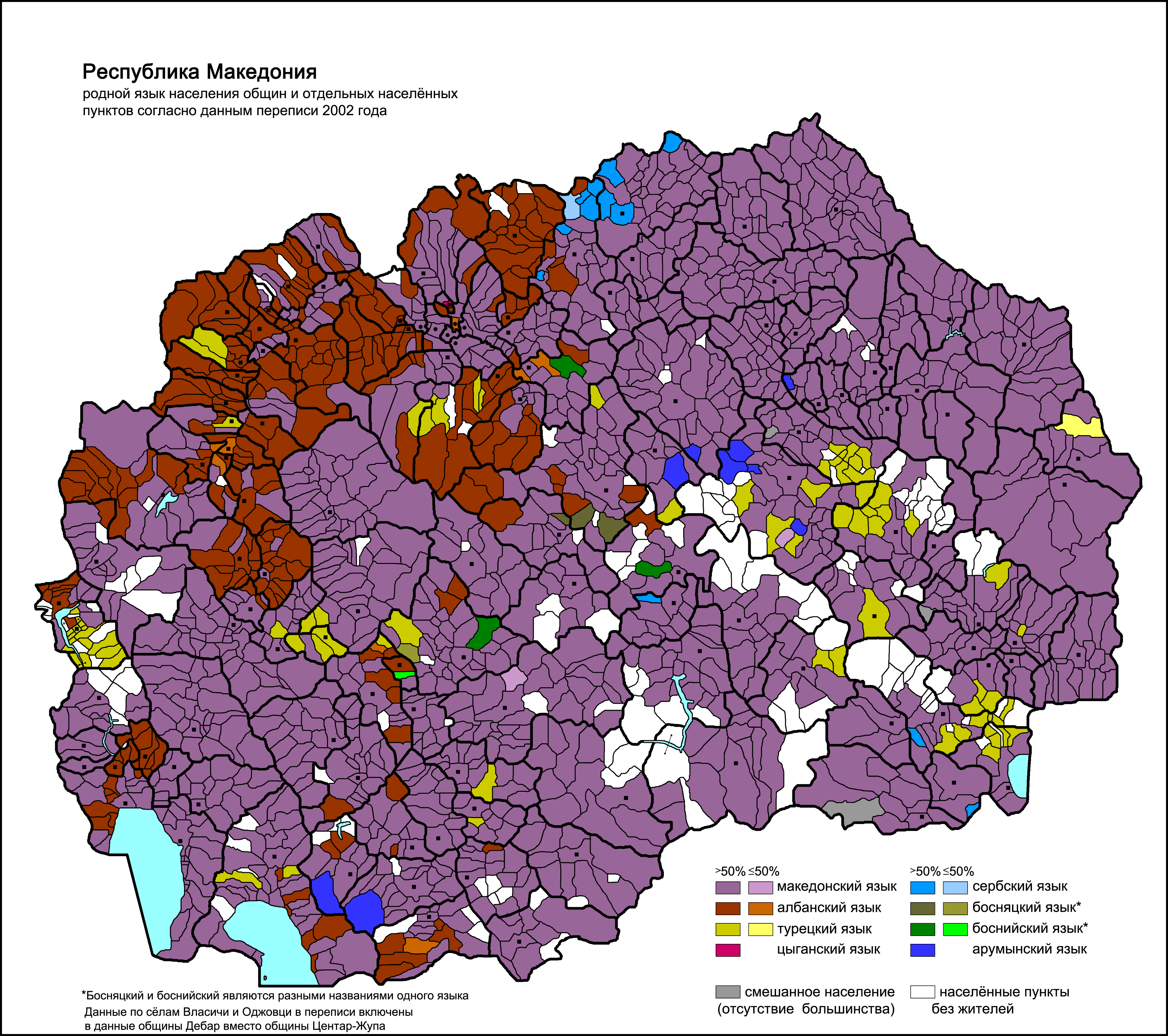
Distribution of Macedonian in North Macedonia (2002 census)

In North Macedonia, according to the 2002 census, among the country's total population of 2,022,547 people, 1,344,815 spoke Macedonian as a native tongue. The number of native speakers in the capital Skopje included 341,340 people. According to data from the census, speakers of Macedonian are the majority in all regions of North Macedonia, except the North-Western regions, which are predominantly populated by native speakers of Albanian. Macedonian is the native language of 70% of all inhabitants of the country. In addition to the Macedonian population, ethnic Albanians, Serbians, Romani, Turkish and Aromanians speak the language to various degrees as secondary speakers.

American linguist Victor Friedman estimated there were 3.5 million speakers in 2001. The annual linguistic database Ethnologue estimated that there were 1,476,500 native speakers of Macedonian in 2016.

== Geographical region of Macedonia ==
The areal span of Macedonian that was formed with the settlement of Slavic people to the Balkans covered the historico-geographical region of Macedonia until the beginning of the 20th century. This territory includes Vardar Macedonia – the territory corresponding to today's North Macedonia – and the bordering regions that were conquered by Albania (Mala Prespa and Gollobordë), Greece (Greek Macedonia; north region of current-day Greece) and Bulgaria (Pirin Macedonia; South-West region of current-day Bulgaria) after the Balkan Wars. Macedonian is predominantly spoken in Vardar Macedonia on the territory of North Macedonia. Speakers of Macedonian dialects of Bulgarian have a Bulgarian linguistic and national sense of identity and in Greece, following the Greek Civil War, the number of speakers decreased to a negligible number due to historical events and policies.

According to the official census of 2011, the number of speakers of Macedonian in Albania was 4,443, and 1,404 in Bulgaria (2011). The number of speakers of Macedonian in North Macedonia and regions and territories that are part of the historical region of Macedonia include:

Country	Population			
Country	Native speakers	Year	Estimates	Year of estimate
North Macedonia	1,344,815	2002 census	2.022.500 (Note: The total number of the population of the Republic of North Macedonia according to the 2002 census. According to Friedman, the vast majority of the country's ethnic minorities who did not indicate Macedonian as their native language speak it to various degrees as a second language.)	2002
Greece	—	—	40,000	2004
Albania	4,443	2011	30,000	2011
Bulgaria	1,404	2011 census	—	—

=== Greek Macedonia ===
Distribution of Macedonian according to the 1980 Harvard Encyclopedia of American Ethnic Groups

In Greece, there is no official statistical measure that reports the number of people who have a Macedonian national identity or who speak Macedonian. In the beginning of the 20th century and until the Balkan Wars, the number of Slavophones in the geographical region of Greek Macedonia included 350,000 people (including approximately 41,000 Muslim Slavs). As a result of the population exchange between Greece and Turkey that took place in 1923, and following migration of the Slavic population, caused by the Greek Civil War in the period of 1946–1949, there were approximately 250,000 "Slavophone Greeks" remaining in the country according to the 1951 census. The approximate number of speakers of Macedonian in Greece in the 2000s, according to several different sources ranges between 10,000 and 250,000 people:

- 10,000–50,000 (according to Country Reports on Human Rights Practices, 2001);
- 80,000–120,000 (according to German linguist Harald Haarmann, 2002);
- up to 200,000 (according to dates published by Russian linguist Rina Pavlovna Usikova, including the number of all Greek Macedonians, regardless of their knowledge of Macedonian).

In Greece, speakers of Macedonian are located predominantly in the Northern regions of the country and in prefectures in the peripheral administrative divisions. Speakers of Macedonian can be found in the prefectures of Central Macedonia, including Pella, Thessaloniki, partially Kilkis (South region), Imathia (Northern region) and Serres (several villages); in the periphery of Western Macedonia, including Florina (70–72 villages), Kastoria (77 villages), partially Kozani (North-Western part); and in the periphery of Epirus in Ioannina (several villages). The number of native speakers and Macedonian language use in these regions has decreased and only a small minority of residents profess a Macedonian ethnic identity. Several Macedonian dialects are native to the Greek region of Macedonia, including Lerin, Lower Prespa, Maleševo-Pirin, Nestram-Kostenar, Kostur, Korča, Solun-Voden and the Ser-Drama-Lagadin-Nevrokop dialect.

However, according to Riki van Boeschoten, the Slavic dialects of Eastern Greek Macedonia are closer to Bulgarian, and the Central dialect used in the area between Edessa and Salonica is an intermediate between Macedonian and Bulgarian. Peter Trudgill also classifies certain peripheral dialects in the far east of Greek Macedonia as part of the Bulgarian language area. Victor Friedman considers those Macedonian dialects, spoken east from Kilkis, to be transitional to the Bulgarian language.

Some Greek Macedonians after the civil war of 1946–1949 moved to countries of Eastern Europe and the former Soviet Union. Around 40,000 Macedonians from the Greek region of Macedonia migrated to countries of Eastern Europe, including: Albania, Romania, Hungary, Czechoslovakia, Poland and to Soviet Union countries such as Uzbekistan, Ukraine and Belarus. A part of the Slavic Greeks also migrated to Australia, the United States and Canada. In the 1970s, some Macedonians repatriated from emigration regions to their historical homeland and they mostly returned to the Yugoslav SR Macedonia.

=== Bulgarian Macedonia ===
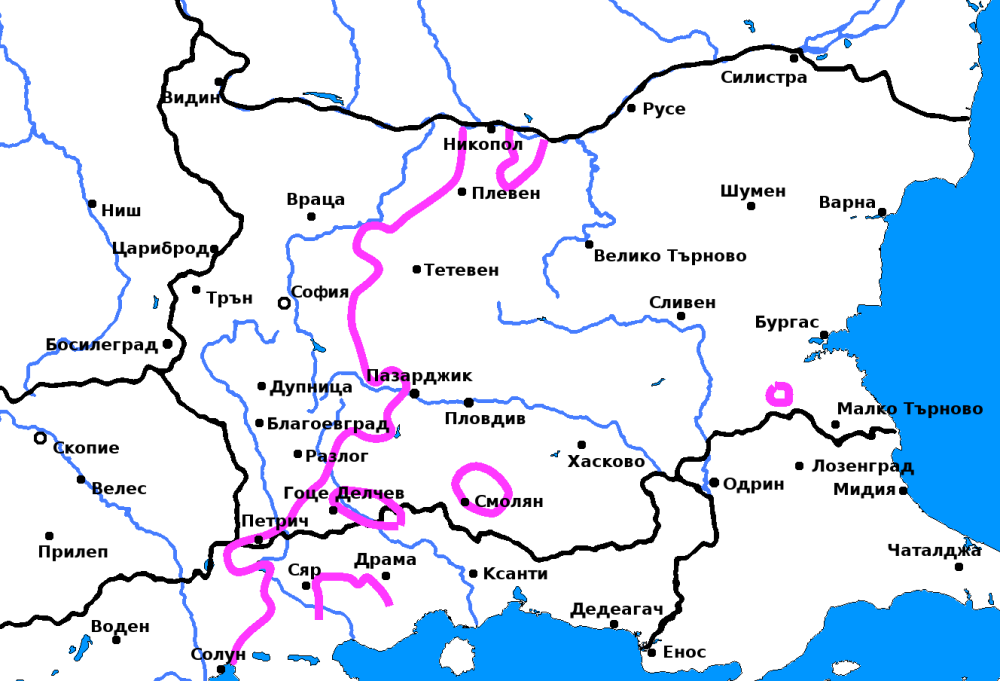
The yat (*ě) split in the Eastern South Slavic.

In Bulgaria, speakers of Macedonian are located in the South-Western part of the country, predominantly in the region of Blagoevgrad. According to the 2011 Bulgarian census, 1404 persons in Bulgaria (561 of them in Blagoevgrad Province) declared Macedonian as their native language. The Macedonian language has been subject to different views in Bulgaria through history. Its existence as a minority language was recognized in Communist Bulgaria shortly following World War II. This led to its declaration as official in the region of Pirin Macedonia in 1947, which also included the publishing of newspapers and books in Macedonian and introducing the language as a subject in schools. Following the Tito–Stalin split taking place at the end of 1947, the Bulgarian government and Academy of Sciences turned slowly back to their pre-1946 view that Macedonian was a variant of Bulgarian and that the Slavic population in Blagoevgrad was Bulgarian. After 1958, Macedonian in Bulgaria was restricted to home use only. Changes in attitudes about the existence of the Macedonian ethnicity were also reflected in the number of people reporting to be Macedonian in censuses in the Pirin region: 252,908 in 1946, 178,862 in 1956 and 8,750 in 1965 following complete suppression of the language. Although there is not a clear separating isogloss between the two languages, the influence of both standards during the time, but also the strong Serbo-Croatian linguistic influence over Macedonian dialects in Yugoslav era, led to a horizontal cross-border dialectal divergence. Jouko Lindstedt has assumed that this dividing line maybe in fact the Yat border, which goes through geographical Macedonia along the Velingrad – Petrich – Thessaloniki line.

There are two dialects in Bulgaria that are considered Macedonian (transitional to Bulgarian) by Friedman and other linguists in North Macedonia as Božidar Vidoeski and Blaže Koneski: the Maleševo-Pirin (widely spoken in most of Blagoevgrad Province in Bulgaria and Delčevo region in the North Macedonia) and the Ser-Drama-Lagadin-Nevrokop dialects. Bulgarian linguists consider these dialects to be Bulgarian. In the context of Bulgarian dialectology, the Ser-Drama-Lagadin-Nevrokop dialects are situated East of the Yat boundary and thus are considered to belong to the Eastern Bulgarian dialects.

=== Albanian Macedonia ===
In Albania, the Macedonophone population lives in the eastern regions of the country, with the largest number of speakers found in the region of Korçë. It is the primary language in the Pustec district and other populations can be found in Mala Prespa and Golo Brdo.

Macedonian is taught and spoken among the Macedonian minority in Albania. It is taught as a school subject in some primary schools is used for some official purposes. There is one Macedonian radio station and news-journal in circulation.

== Post-Yugoslav countries ==
In post-Yugoslav countries, speakers of Macedonian do not form regions with compact communities. An exception to this is the ethnic group of Gorani people, members of which populate the South-West region of Kosovo and the bordering region of Albania. The Gora dialects are defined by Macedonian linguists, among whom Božidar Vidoeski, as part of the Macedonian dialectical system. In Serbia and Croatia, however, these dialects, linguists such as Dalibor Brozović and Pavle Ivić, consider these dialects part of the Serbo-Croatian language while Bulgarian linguists include the Goran dialects in the Western Bulgarian dialectal area. The Gorani people however do not have an ethnic and linguistic self-identity, and during the 2011 census in Kosovo, they either listed their language as Goranski (also known as Našinski), as well as Serbian and Bosnian. In the region of Gora in Kosovo, there were 10.265 Gorani people. In Serbia, the number of Gorani people included 7.767 according to the 2011 census. The Government of Kosovo began to teach Macedonian after it acquired Macedonian-language textbooks and grammar books for the Gorani population.

According to this census, Macedonian populations constitute a significant majority in several villages of Vojvodina, Dužine, Plandiste and Jabuka. In total, there are 12.706 speakers of Macedonian in Serbia and the number of ethnic Macedonian includes 22.755 people Thousands of ethnic Macedonians migrated to Serbia in the 1960s and 1970s. Currently there is no specific program to educate students in Macedonian. Yet there are attempts to introduce Macedonian language classes into areas where there is a significant minority.

The total number of speakers of Macedonian in other ex-Yugoslav countries includes more than 10,000 people according to data from censuses. In Croatia, 3.519 people declared Macedonian as their native tongue (2011) In Slovenia, the number of Macedonian speakers included 4.525 and 4.760 people in 1991 and 2002, respectively. In Montenegro, Macedonians are only represented by a small community, totaling 569 people in the 2011 census.

In Bosnia and Herzegovina most Macedonian people live in Sarajevo and Banja Luka, although there are no exact numbers of the speakers of Macedonian there. According to the Yugoslav census of 1991, 1.950 Macedonians lived in Bosnia and Herzegovina. The number of speakers of Macedonian in ex-Yugoslav countries is summarized below:

Country	Number			
Country	Number	Year	Estimate	Year of estimate
Serbia	12,706	2011 census	22,755	2011
Slovenia	4,760	2002 census	—	—
Croatia	3,519	2011 census	—	—
Bosnia and Herzegovina	—	—	1,950	1991 census
Montenegro	529	2011 census	—	—

== Northern and Western Europe ==
Macedonian serves as the first or second language of many migrant communities and second-generation children in countries of Western Europe — Germany, Switzerland, Italy and others. According to data by the Ministry of Foreign Affairs of North Macedonia, in 2008, there were around 284.600 Macedonians in Western, South-Western and Northern Europe, including 75–85,000 in Germany, 63,000 in Switzerland, 50,000 in Italy and 12–15,000 in Sweden.

The total number of speakers of Macedonian in Northern and Western Europe includes:

Country	Number			
Country	Census data	Census year	Estimate	Year of estimate
Germany	—	—	62,295— —85,000	2006; 2008
Italy	—	—	50,000— —73,407	2008; 2011
Switzerland	6.415	2005	63,100	2008
Austria	5.145	2001	10,000— —15,000	2008
Sweden	—	—	5,376— —13,500	2012; 2006
Belgium	—	—	7,325— —12,000	2012; 2006
Netherlands	—	—	12,500	2006
Denmark	—	—	12,000	2006
France	—	—	12,000	2006
United Kingdom	—	—	9,500	2006
Norway	—	—	715— —2,000	2002; 2008

== North America ==
Distribution of speakers of Macedonian in the US (2000)

Macedonian is present as the first or second language in migrant communities and second-generation children in the United States and Canada. According to data by the Ministry of Foreign Affairs of North Macedonia in 2008, the number of the Macedonian diaspora in the US and Canada numbered 350,000 people, 150,000 of which lived in the latter country. In the US, the largest concentrations of Macedonian speakers is in the states of Michigan (mostly in Detroit), northern New Jersey and southern New York, and Ohio. The number of speakers of Macedonian in the US and Canada includes:

country	Number			
country	Census data	Census year	Estimate	Year of estimate
US	20.787	2010 census	200,000	2008
Canada	17.245	2011 census	150,000	2008

== Australia and New Zealand ==
Distribution of Macedonian speakers in regions of Australia in 2011. It is the second country after North Macedonia with the largest number of native speakers.

Macedonian has had a long history in Australia, from the pečalbari/seasonal workers to the mass migrations of ethnic Macedonians from Greece and the Republic of North Macedonia.

The 1976 census reported that 16,691 people spoke Macedonian at home. By 1986 this number had risen significantly to 45,610. The 1991 census reported 64,428 people speaking the language at home. The language continued to increase in use with 71,371 speakers in 1996 and 71,994 speakers in 2001. The same year, Macedonian was the ninth most spoken language at home in Australia other than English. The first actual decline in language usage occurred in 2006 when only 67,831 people declared they spoke Macedonian at home. According to the 2011 census, 68.846 people spoke Macedonian as a first language while according to other statistics, the total number of Macedonian speakers numbered 200,000. According to data published by the Ministry of Foreign Affairs of North Macedonia, the number of speakers of Macedonian in Australia and New Zealand includes 215,000 people, 15,000 of which are situated in the latter country.

In 2001 the largest concentration of speakers were in Melbourne: 30.831, Sydney: 19.980, Wollongong: 7.420, Perth: 5.772 and Newcastle: 2.095. Other concentrations include Geelong, Queanbeyan, Shepparton, Richmond and Brisbane. It is possible to choose Macedonian as a study option in the New South Wales Higher School Certificate and the Victorian VCE. The language is also offered at Macquarie University.

The number of speakers of Macedonian in Australia and New Zealand includes:

Country	Numbers			
Country	Census data	Census year	Estimate	Year of estimate
Australia	68.846	2011	200,000	2008
New Zealand	—	—	807— —15,000	2006; 2008

== Other countries ==
Other countries include negligible number of Macedonian speakers. In Russia, according to data from the 2010 census, there were 507 speakers of Macedonian In the past, Macedonian was spoken in several countries of Eastern Europe and the USSR due to the migration of Slavic Greek Macedonians following the Greek Civil War (1946–1949). However, the number of speakers of Macedonian in those countries significantly reduced since many displaced Macedonians migrated back to the Socialist Republic of Macedonia or to the region of Greek Macedonia. The number of speakers of Macedonian in Central and Eastern European countries includes:

Country	Number			
Country	Census data	Census year	Estimate	Year of estimate
Czech Republic	—	—	533— —2,000	2001; 2008
Poland	—	—	204— —2,000	2001; 2008
Romania	769	2011	—	—

== Bibliography ==
- Cook, Bernard (2001). Europe Since 1945: An Encyclopedia. Taylor & Francis. ISBN 0-8153-4058-3.
- Candelier, Michel (2004). Janua Linguarum — The gateway to languages. The introduction of language awareness into the curriculum: Awakening to languages (PDF). Council of Europe Publishing. ISBN 92-871-5312-4. Archived from the original (PDF) on 2010-06-25.
- Coenen-Huther, Jacques (1996). Bulgaria at the Crossroads. Nova Publishers. ISBN 1-56072-305-X.
- Crvenkovska, Emilija; Petroska, Elena. Македонскиот јазик како втор и странски: терминолошки прашања [Macedonian as a foreign and second language: terminological questions] (PDF) (in Macedonian). Ss. Cyril and Methodius University of Skopje.
- Duličenko, Aleksandr D. (2001). "Slawische Sprachen. Ägäis-Makedonisch" (PDF). Enzyklopädie des europäischen Ostens (in German). Alpen-Adria-Universität Klagenfurt. p. 183. Archived from the original (PDF) on 2016-03-04.
- Friedman, Victor (1993). Comrie B.; Corbett G (eds.). The Slavonic Languages: Macedonian. London, New York: Routledge. pp. 249–305. ISBN 0-415-04755-2.
- Friedman, Victor (2001). Garry, Jane; Rubino, Carl (eds.). Macedonian: Facts about the World's Languages: An Encyclopedia of the Worlds Major Languages, Past and Present (PDF). New York: Holt. pp. 435–439. Archived from the original (PDF) on 2019-07-10.
- Friedman, Victor (2001). Macedonian. Slavic and Eurasian Language Resource Center (SEELRC), Duke University.
- Haarmann, Harald (2002). Kleines Lexikon der Sprachen [A Small Lexicon of Languages] (in German) (2 ed.). München: Verlag C.H.Beck. p. 455. ISBN 3-406-47558-2.
- Kramer, Christina (1999). "Official Language, Minority Language, No Language at All: The History of Macedonian in Primary Education in the Balkans". Language Problems and Language Planning. 23 (3): 233–250. doi:10.1075/lplp.23.3.03kra.
- Poulton, Hugh (2000). Who Are the Macedonians?. United Kingdom: C. Hurst & Co. ISBN 0-253-34598-7.
- Topolinjska, Zuzanna (1998). "In place of a foreword: facts about the Republic of Macedonia and the Macedonian language". International Journal of the Sociology of Language (131): 1–11. doi:10.1515/ijsl.1998.131.1. S2CID 143257269.
- Usikova, Rina Pavlovna (1994). О языковой ситуации в Республике Македонии [About the language situation in the Republic of Macedonia] (in Russian). Moscow: Nauka. pp. 221–231. ISBN 5-02-011187-2.
- Usikova, Rina Pavlovna (2005). Языки мира. Славянские языки: Македонский язык [Languages of the world. Slavic languages: Macedonian language] (in Russian). Moscow: Academia. pp. 102–139. ISBN 5-87444-216-2.
