= Zlatograd dialect =

Dialect of Bulgarian

The Zlatograd dialect is a Bulgarian dialect, member of the Rup or Southeastern Bulgarian dialects. The Zlatograd dialect is spoken in the southwestern part of the Eastern Rhodopes, i.e. in the town of Zlatograd, as well as a number of neighbouring villages and towns, e.g. Nedelino, Kirkovo, etc. The Zlatograd dialect is most closely related to the eastern and western Rup dialects, but also shares a number of phonological and morphological characteristics with the Rhodopean dialects. Thus, it is usually considered to be transitional between the two groups.

== Phonological and morphological characteristics ==
- The reflex of Old Church Slavonic yat is usually ʲa before a hard syllable and broad e (æ) before a soft syllable: бял/бæли instead of formal Bulgarian бял/бели (white). However, there are also a number of cases where the reflex of yat is ʲa even before a soft syllable: врʲaме vs. formal Bulgarian време. This a feature the Zlatograd dialect shares with the Serres-Nevrokop dialect and certain subdialects of the Thracian dialect
- a is not transformed into /ɛ/ before a soft syllable: жаба-жаби as in Standard Bulgarian. This is a Western Bulgarian feature separating the Zlatograd dialect from the rest of the Rup dialects
- Individual development of the Old Church Slavonic jers and nasal vowels (as in the Rup dialects):

ъ (ə) for Old Church Slavonic ѫ (yus) and ъ (ə) (as in Standard Bulgarian) – мъш, сън (man, sleep)
ɛ for both Old Church Slavonic little yus (ѧ) and ь

- Articulation of unstressed o as a (as in Russian): кабила vs. formal Bulgarian кобила (mare). This feature is also typical for the Smolyan dialect

For other phonological and morphological characteristics typical for all Rup or Rhodopean dialects, cf. Rup dialects.

== Sources ==
Стойков, Стойко: Българска диалектология, Акад. изд. "Проф. Марин Дринов", 2006
