= Kyustendil dialect =

Dialect of Bulgarian

The Kyustendil dialect is a Bulgarian dialect, member of the Southwestern Bulgarian dialects, which is spoken in the region of Kyustendil in central western Bulgaria. It borders on the Transitional dialects to the north, the Dupnitsa dialect to the east and the Blagoevgrad-Petrich dialect to the south. It is closely related to the Dupnitsa dialect.

== Phonological and morphological characteristics ==
- щ/жд (ʃt~ʒd) for Proto-Slavic *tʲ~*dʲ (as in Standard Bulgarian) - леща, между (lentils, between). The future tense particle, however, is че: че че'темe vs. Standard Bulgarian ще четем (we will read)
- Vowel a for Old Bulgarian ѫ (yus): маж vs. formal Bulgarian мъж (man). Limited number of u reflexes of yus (as in the Samokov and the Dupnitsa dialect): пупка vs. Standard Bulgarian пъпка (pimple)
- Vowel o for Old Bulgarian ъ in suffixes and prefixes and most roots and a limited number of a reflexes in certain roots: сос него vs. Standard Bulgarian със него (with him), бочва vs. Standard Bulgarian бъчва (cask) but вашка vs. Standard Bulgarian въшка (louse)
- Vocalic r for Old Bulgarian ръ/рь instead of the combination ръ/ър (rə~ər) in Standard Bulgarian - дрво instead of дърво (tree).
- The reflex of Old Bulgarian лъ/ль is:

Before non-labial consonant - schwa (ə): съза vs. formal Bulgarian сълза
Before labial consonant - u: вуна vs. formal Bulgarian вълна (wool)

- Verb ending -м in verbs of the first and second conjugation: чет'ем vs. formal Bulgarian чет'ъ (I read)
- Adverbial participal on -ечки (vs. -ейки/айки in Standard Bulgarian): играечки vs. formal Bulgarian играейки (while playing)
- Еnding йe instead of formal Bulgarian и for multi-syllable masculine nouns (галабйе instead of гълъби)
- Dynamic stress

For other phonological and morphological characteristics typical for all Southwestern dialects, cf. Southwestern Bulgarian dialects.

== Sources ==
Стойков, Стойко: Българска диалектология, Акад. изд. "Проф. Марин Дринов", 2006
