= Rup dialects =

Group of Bulgarian dialects

Rup
- Region: Eastern Bulgaria, Greece
- Ethnicity: Bulgarians
- Language family: Indo-European: Balto-Slavic; Slavic; South Slavic; Bulgarian; Rup
- Dialects: Strandzha; Thracian; Smolyan (Including:Pomak); Hvoyna; Chepino; Paulician; Zlatograd; Babyak; Razlog; Serres-Nevrokop

Language codes
- ISO 639-3: None (mis)
- Glottolog: rupp1234
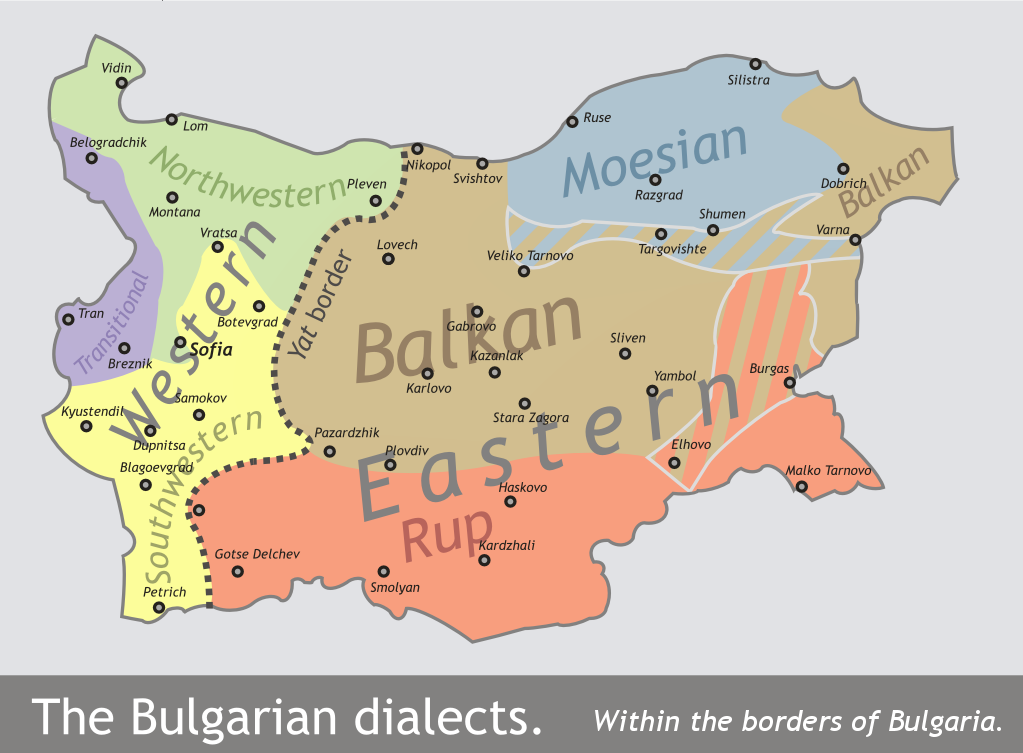
- Map of the Bulgarian dialects within Bulgaria, including Rup. Rup

The Rup dialects (Bulgarian: Рупски говори, romanized: Rupski govori), or the Southeastern dialects, are a group of Bulgarian dialects located east of the yat boundary, thus being part of the Eastern dialect. The range of the Rup dialects includes the southern part of Bulgaria, i.e. Strandzha, the region of Haskovo, the Rhodopes and the eastern half of Pirin Macedonia.

== Overview ==
Before the Balkan Wars and World War I, the Rup dialects covered a much larger territory, including vast areas of Eastern Thrace, Western Thrace and the eastern part of Greek Macedonia. Following the wars, most of the Bulgarian population in these areas fled or resettled to Bulgaria and nowadays, the Rup dialects outside Bulgaria are spoken only by the Muslim Bulgarians (Pomaks) in Western Thrace in Greece. Unlike the Northwestern or the Balkan dialects, the dialects included in the Rup group are not uniform and have vastly different phonological characteristics. What brings them together is the vast array of reflexes of Old Church Slavonic ѣ (yat). Whereas the Western Bulgarian dialects have only [ɛ] for yat in all positions and the Balkan dialects have [ʲa] or [ɛ], depending on the character of the following syllable, the Rup dialects feature a number of different reflexes, none of which is similar to the ones in the Western Bulgarian or the Balkan dialects. These reflexes include: [ʲa] in all positions, broad е ([æ]) in all positions, [ʲa] before a hard syllable and broad e ([æ]) before a soft syllable, broad e ([æ]) in a stressed syllable and normal e in an unstressed syllable, etc. etc.

== Phonological and morphological characteristics ==
The following phonological and morphological characteristics apply to all Rup dialects:

- щ/жд ([ʃt]/[ʒd]) for Proto-Slavic *tʲ/*dʲ (as in Standard Bulgarian) - леща, между (lentils, between)
- A large number of palatal consonants in all possible positions of the word: кʲитʲкʲи vs. formal Bulgarian китки (wrists)
- Soft (palatal) ж /ʒ/, ш /ʃ/, ч /t͡ʃ/: жʲаба vs. formal Bulgarian жаба (frog). The Rup dialects are very archaic with regard to this as in all other Bulgarian dialects, these consonants have become hard and are now part of the hard consonants
- Preserved consonant х ([x]) in all positions: ходи (walks)
- Widespread labialisation of [i] into [u]: йуме vs. formal Bulgarian име (name)
- Transition of the consonant group -дн into -нн: гланна vs. formal Bulgarian гладна (hungry) (cf. Subbalkan dialect)

== Division of the Rup dialects ==
The Rup dialects can furthermore be divided into two large groups, "true" Rup dialects (further divided into western and eastern Rup dialects based on geographical grounds) and Rhodopean dialects. The two groups are sometimes treated as separate dialectal groups. The "true" Rup dialects include the Strandzha dialect, the Thracian dialect, the Serres-Nevrokop dialect and, with some reservations, the Babyak and Razlog dialects. The Rhodopean dialects comprise the Smolyan, Hvoyna, Paulician and Chepino dialect, whereas the Zlatograd dialect is transitional between the two groups. The Babyak and Razlog dialect are usually classified as Rup dialects on account of the reflexes of Old Church Slavonic ѣ (yat). However, most of their other phonological properties are similar or identical to the ones of the Southwestern Bulgarian dialects, and especially to the Samokov and Ihtiman dialect, and that's why they are often considered to be transitional between the two groups.

== Phonological and morphological characteristics of the "true" Rup dialects ==
- The reflex of Old Church Slavonic yat is usually [ʲa] before a hard syllable and broad e ([æ]) before a soft syllable: бял/б[æ]ли instead of formal Bulgarian бял/бели (white)
- Vowel reduction of unstressed /a/, /ɛ/ and /ɔ/ which is weaker than the reduction in the Balkan dialects, yet stronger than the one accepted in the formal language
- Transition of a into /ɛ/ or broad e ([æ]) after a soft (palatal) consonant and before a soft syllable: жаба-жеби/ж[æ]би (frog-frogs), чаша-чеши/чæши (cup-cups), пиян-пийени/пий[æ]ни (drunk sing. - drunk pl.), which is similar to the one in the Central Balkan dialect. This is not accepted in Standard Bulgarian, which has instead adopted Western Bulgarian жаба-жаби, чаша-чаши, пиян-пияни
- ъ ([ə]) for Old Church Slavonic ѫ (yus) and ъ ([ə]) (as in Standard Bulgarian) – мъш, сън (man, sleep)
- [ɛ] for both Old Church Slavonic little yus (ѧ) and ь (Standard Bulgarian has ɛ for the little yus and [ə] for the small jer)
- Suffix -цк[ʲ]и instead of -ски for qualitative adjectives: женцк[ʲ]и instead of formal Bulgarian женски (female)

== Phonological and morphological characteristics of the Rhodopean dialects ==
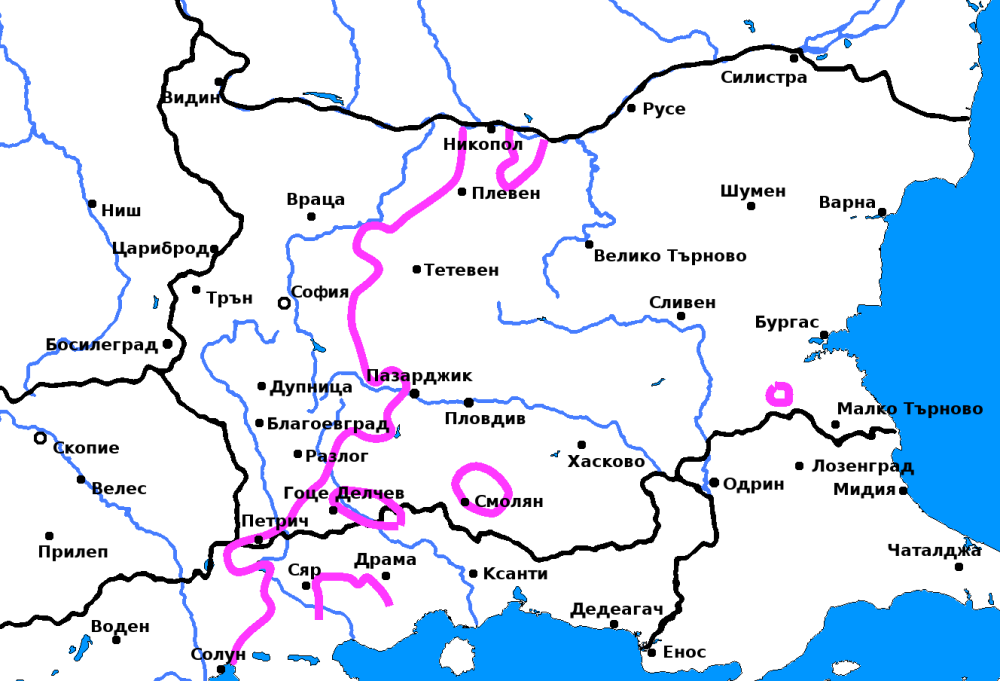
Yat border in the Bulgarian language

The Rhodopean dialects occupy the middle part of the Rup dialects, i.e. the central and western Rhodopes. Due to the mountainous terrain and the relative isolation the speakers which lasted well into the beginning of the 20th century, the Rhodopean dialects are both very well preserved and extremely idiosyncratic with regard to the other Bulgarian dialects. The Rhodopean dialects have the following common phonological and morphological properties:

- Broad e (æ) for Old Church Slavonic yat in all positions and regardless of the word stress and the character of the following syllable: бæл/бæли vs. formal Bulgarian бял/бели (white), голʲæм/голʲæми vs. formal Bulgarian голям/големи (big). This makes the Rhodopean dialects extremely archaic as the broad e is considered to be the original pronunciation of Old Church Slavonic yat
- Full transition of a into broad e (æ) after a soft (palatal) consonant: жʲæбa (frog), чʲæшa (cup)
- Merger of Old Church Slavonic big yus ѫ, little yus ѧ, ь and ъ into one vowel which is different, depending on the individual dialect
- Lack of consonants дж /dʒ/ and дз /dz/ - ж /ʒ/ and з /z/ are pronounced instead: жʲам vs. Standard Bulgarian джам (windowpane)

== Sources ==
- Drinov, Marin (2006). "Стойков, Стойко: Българска диалектология" [Stoykov, Stoyko: Bulgarian dialectology] (in Bulgarian).
