= Pomak language =

Variety of Bulgarian

Pomak language (Greek: πομακική γλώσσα, romanized: pomakikí glósa or πομακικά, pomakiká; Bulgarian: помашки език, romanized: pomaški ezik; Turkish: Pomakça) is a term used in Greece and Turkey to refer to some of the Rup dialects of the Bulgarian language spoken by the Pomaks of Western Thrace in Greece and Eastern Thrace in Turkey. These dialects are native also in Bulgaria, and are classified as part of the Smolyan subdialect. Not all Pomaks speak this dialect as their mother language.

== Writing system ==
Several orthographies have been proposed for Pomak, based on the Greek, Latin, and Cyrillic scripts.

One of the proposed alphabets: A a, Ä ä, B b, Ch ch, D d, E e, F f, G g, H h, I i, Ï ï, K k, L l, M m, N n, O o, Ö ö, P p, R r, S s, Sh sh, T t, Ts ts, Tz tz, J j, U u, Ü ü, V v, Y y, Z z, Zh zh. That proposal does not follow the usual spelling conventions for Slavic languages, but instead follows English spelling conventions (y for /j/; ch, sh, zh, j for postalveolars), with Tz tz representing /dz/ (following the Greek spelling τζ) and Ä ä, Ï ï, Ö ö, Ü ü representing special Pomak vowels. Stressed vowels are indicated consistently using the acute accent (as in Greek); stressed Ä ä, Ï ï, Ö ö, Ü ü are written as Â â, Î î, Ô ô, Û û. The letter X x and the digraph Th th are also used in loanwords.

== History ==
Some grammatical forms of the Rup dialects, published by the Danish linguist Holger Pedersen in 1907, have a striking resemblance to the grammatical forms of the Armenian language. As well, the Rup dialects have slightly different forms of demonstrative suffixes (exercising also functions of the possessive pronouns) from the Bulgarian Tran dialect and the modern standard Macedonian language. There are publications concerning the vocabulary of the Rup dialects and anthroponyms of Armenian origin which overlap areas, populated by Paulicians from the 15th to 18th centuries.

According to the 1935 census in Turkey, 3881 people in Eastern Thrace identified their mother tongue as Bulgarian and 18,382 as Pomak. The overall statistic from 1935 shows that 41,041 people spoke Pomak as their mother tongue or as a secondary dialect.

In the mid-1990s, "Grammar of the Pomash language", "Pomash-Greek" and "Greek-Pomash dictionary" were published in Greece, which, according to Bulgarian linguists, were a political attempt at glottotomy. Pomak is also noted for its dialectal differences, as highlighted in recent work by Sercan Karakas (2022), which demonstrates that the language's case system exhibits dialectal variation.

== Examples ==
Some phrases and words

English	Rhodope Pomak Dialect (Xanthi, Komotini, Alexandroupoli)
Hello	Dobar den (Formal), Zdravej (Informal)
I am Pomak/Bulgarian/Bulgarian Muslim (man)	Ja sam Pomak/Balgarin/Balgarski Mohamedanin
I speak bulgarian	Ja lafim balgarcko
How are you?	Kak si?
Thank you	Blagodarja
Good day	Dobar den
Children	Detine
This chair	Aisos skemle
That auntie	Ainos lelka
Ibrahim is my uncle	Ibrahim e moj amiđa
Hatiđa is my sister	Hatiđa e moja sestra
My father	Mojet bubajko
What are you doing?	Kina rabutaš?
I knew	Ja znajeh
Do you know?	Znaješ li ti?
He was a good man	Toj beše dobar čilak
I am from Xanthi	Ja sam ot Skeča
One woman from the new village	Enna žena ot novoto selo
One day and one night	Edin den i enna nošt
Last year	Lani
I love you	Milovam te

The majority of the Pomak lexicon is of Eastern South Slavic origin, although some Turkish and Greek loans are present.

== Grammar ==
=== Spatio-pragmatic and temporal-modal uses of nominals and noun modifiers ===
Three deictics (-s-, -t- and -n-) are used for spatio-pragmatic and temporal-modal reference in nominals. These deictics are used among others in noun modifiers such as definite articles and demonstratives:

The cat	(close to the speaker, here and now)	Koteso
The cat	(close to the addressee or realis past)	Koteto
The cat	(distal, realis future, irrealis or habitual)	Koteno
This is grand-father's snake		Aisos e dedvasa zmie
That is grand-father's chair		Ainos e dedvasa skemle
