= Maleševo-Pirin dialect =

Dialect of Bulgarian and Macedonian

The term Maleševo-Pirin or Maleshevo-Pirin or Pirin-Maleshevo dialect is used in South Slavic linguistics to refer to a group of related varieties that are spoken on both sides of the border of Bulgaria and the Republic of North Macedonia. Some linguists treat them as dialects of the Bulgarian language, while Victor Friedman views them as part of Macedonian. According to some authors, they are linguistically transitional between the two national languages, Bulgarian and Macedonian and form part of the larger dialect continuum between them. The dialect group is named after the mountain ranges of Pirin in Bulgaria and Maleševo in Bulgaria and North Macedonia. When referring specifically to the dialects on the Bulgarian side, the term Petrich-Blagoevgrad dialect, after the two major towns in the area, is also used.

== Classification ==
Macedonian linguists tend to treat the whole group as part of Macedonian, classifying it as part of a southeastern group of Macedonian dialects, whereas from the perspective of Bulgarian linguistics, the varieties in Bulgaria and North Macedonia are classified as parts of the eastern subgroup of the Southwestern Bulgarian dialects.

Indeed, during much of its history, the Eastern South Slavic dialect continuum, including the Maleshevo-Blagoevgrad-Petrich region, was simply referred to as "Bulgarian", and Slavic speakers in Macedonia referred to their own language as balgàrtzki, bùgarski or bugàrski; i.e. Bulgarian. According to Dennis P. Hupchick:

Until a modern Macedonian literary language was mandated by the communist-led partisan movement from Macedonia in 1944, most outside observers and linguists agreed with the Bulgarians in considering the vernacular spoken by the Macedonian Slavs as a western dialect of Bulgarian.

However, according to modern Western sociolinguists, the dispute is entirely irrelevant from a modern perspective, as it fails to take into consideration the ethnic and linguistic identity of the speakers. According to Trudgill, the question whether Bulgarian and Macedonian are distinct languages or dialects of a single language cannot be resolved on a purely linguistic basis, but should rather take into account sociolinguistic criteria, i.e., ethnic and linguistic identity. Jouko Lindstedt also opines that the dividing line between Macedonian and Bulgarian should be defined by the linguistic identity of the speakers, i.e., by the state border:

Macedonian dialectology... considers the dialects of south-western Bulgaria to be Macedonian, despite the lack of any widespread Macedonian national consciousness in that area. The standard map is provided by Vidoeski.(1998: 32) It would be futile to tell an ordinary citizen of the Macedonian capital, Skopje, that they do not realise that they are actually speaking Bulgarian. It would be equally pointless to tell citizens of the southwestern Bulgarian town of Blagoevgrad that they (or at least their compatriots in the surrounding countryside) do not ‘really’ speak Bulgarian, but Macedonian. In other words, regardless of the structural and linguistic arguments put forth by a majority of Bulgarian dialectologists, as well as by their Macedonian counterparts, they are ignoring one, essential fact – that the present linguistic identities of the speakers themselves in various regions do not always correspond to the prevailing nationalist discourses.

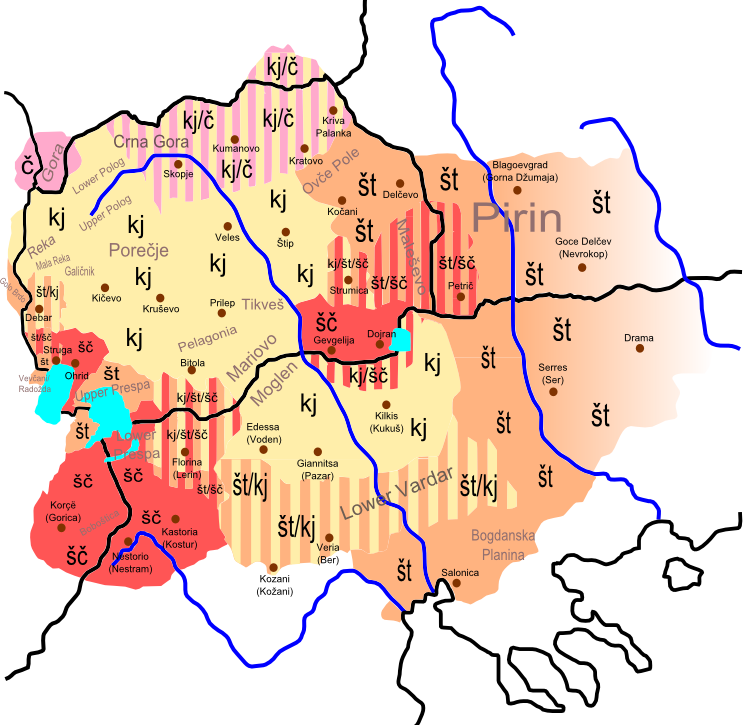
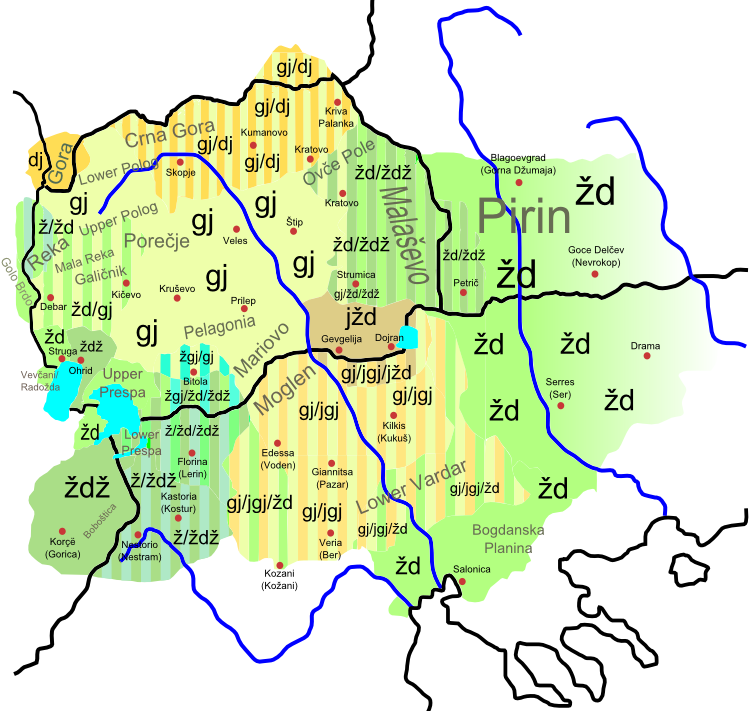
Macedonian map of the reflexes of Pra-Slavic *tʲ/kt and *dʲ in the wider Macedonian region. Bulgarian щ/жд (ʃt/ʒd) clearly predominate in Pirin Macedonia, the eastern part of Greek Macedonia and the easternmost part of the Republic of North Macedonia, whereas Macedonian ќ/ѓ (c/ɟ) is dominant in the rest of the geographical region.

The dialect is spoken in the towns of Delčevo, Pehčevo, Berovo and the surrounding villages in the east of the Republic of Macedonia, and in the regions of Blagoevgrad, Petrich and Sandanski in Bulgaria.

The Blagoevgrad-Petric dialect is also closely related to the neighbouring Kyustendil and Samokov dialects, and especially to the Dupnitsa dialect, whereas the Maleshevo dialect is closely related especially with the Strumica dialect.

== Linguistic properties ==
The following is a table of distinctive phonological and grammatical features, comparing the values found in the Maleshevo and Blagoevgrad-Petrich dialects with Standard Bulgarian, Standard Macedonian and two neighbouring Western Bulgarian dialect areas. Some features in this table are also present in English.

Comparison of the Maleshevo dialect and the Blagoevgrad-Petrich dialect with Standard Bulgarian and Standard Macedonian

Parameter	Standard Macedonian	Maleshevo dialect	Blagoevgrad-Petrich dialect	Dupnitsa dialect (Western Bulgarian)	Samokov dialect (Western Bulgarian)	Standard Bulgarian (based on Eastern Bulgarian)	English
Proto-Slavic *tʲ/*dʲ / Old Church Slavonic щ/жд (ʃt/ʒd)	ќ/ѓ (c/ɟ) — леќа/меѓу	щ/жд (ʃt/ʒd) or шч/жџ (ʃtʃ/dʒ) — леща/между or лешча/межџу ќ/ѓ (c/ɟ) — леќа/меѓу in some areas	щ/жд (ʃt/ʒd) — леща/между	щ/жд (ʃt/ʒd) — леща/между	щ/жд (ʃt/ʒd) — леща/между шч (ʃtʃ) — лешча for *tʲ in some areas	щ/жд (ʃt/ʒd) — леща/между	lentils/between
Proto-Slavic *ɡt/kt / Old Church Slavonic щ (ʃt)	ќ (c) — ноќ	ќ (c) — ноќ щ (ʃt) — нощ in some areas	щ (ʃt) — нощ	щ (ʃt) — нощ	щ (ʃt) — нощ	щ (ʃt) — нощ	night
Old Church Slavonic ѣ (yat)	е (ɛ) — бел/бели	е (ɛ) — бел/бели	е (ɛ) — бел/бели	е (ɛ) — бел/бели	е (ɛ) — бел/бели	я/е (ʲa/ɛ) — бял/бели	white
Old Church Slavonic ѫ (yus), approx. ɔ̃	а (a) — маж	а (a) — маж	а (a) — маж	а (a) — маж	а (a) — маж	ъ (ɤ) — мъж	man
Old Church Slavonic ъ	о (ɔ) — сон, вошка	о (ɔ) — сон, вошка	о (ɔ) — сон, вошка	о (ɔ) & а (a) — сон, but вашка	а (a) — сан, вашка о (ɔ) in ind. words — петок	ъ (ɤ) — сън	dream
Old Church Slavonic ръ/рь	vocalic r — врв, крв, дрво	vocalic r/ро (ɾɔ) — врох, крф, дрво	ръ (ɾɤ) — връх, кръв, дръво	vocalic r — врх, крф, дрво	ръ (ɾɤ) — връх, кръв, дръво	ръ/ър (ɾɤ/ɤɾ) — връх, кръв, дърво	summit, blood
Old Church Slavonic лъ/ль	oл (ɔl) — солза, волк	ъ (ɤ) — съза, вък	ъ (ɤ) — съза, вък	voc. l/ъ (ɤ) — слза/съза, depend. on region у (u) — вук after labial cons.	у (u) — суза, вук	лъ/ъл (lɤ/ɤl) — сълза, вълк	tear
Old Church Slavonic x (x)	Lost or replaced by ф/в (f/v) — бев, убаво	Mixed — бех, убаво	Mixed — бех, убаво	Mixed — бех, убаво	Mixed — бех, убаво	Preserved — бях, хубаво	was, nice
Vowel reduction	No	No	No — in Blagoevgrad Yes — of а (a) in Petrich subdialect	No	No	Yes — of а (a) and o (ɔ) No — of е (ɛ)	Yes — of all vowels in any/all unstressed syllables regardless of spelling
Definite article	Triple definite article — момчето/момчево/момчено	Single definite article — момчето	Single definite article — момчето	Single definite article — момчето	Single definite article — момчето	Single definite article — момчето	Single definite article — the boy
Ending of verbs in 1st person sing. present time	ам for all conjugations (че́там, пишам, имам)	а — 1st & 2nd conj. (чета, пиша) ам — 3rd conj. (имам)	а — 1st & 2nd conj. (чета, пиша) ам — 3rd conj. (имам)	а — 1st & 2nd conj. (чета, пиша) or ам — for all conj. (четам, пишам, имам) depending on region	(а/и/е)м for all conj. (четем, пишем, имам)	а (я) — 1st & 2nd conj. (чета, пиша) ам (ям) — 3rd conj. (имам)	(I) read, (I) write
Formation of past perfect tense	имам + past passive aorist participle — имам пишувано, имам молено	бeх + past participle — бех писал, бех молил	бeх + past participle — бех писал, бех молил	бeх + past participle — бех писал, бех молил	бех + past participle — бех писал, бeх молил	бях + past participle — бях писал, бях молил	had + past participle — (I) had read, (I) had written
Word stress	Fixed antepenultim. — ˈдобиток, ˈпере	Dynamic — доˈбиток, пеˈре	Dynamic — доˈбиток, пеˈре	Dynamic — доˈбиток, пеˈре	Dynamic — доˈбиток, пеˈре	Dynamic — доˈбитък, пеˈре	Dynamic — ˈcattle/ˈlivestock, (he/she/it) ˈwashes

As shown by the table, the Maleshevo and the Blagoevgrad-Petrich dialect show mixed Bulgarian and Macedonian phonological traits and mostly Bulgarian grammatical traits (several instead of one conjugation, single definite article, formation of past perfect tense with бeх, etc.), with the Maleshevo dialect ranging mostly towards Macedonian and the Blagoevgrad-Petrich dialect ranging mostly towards Bulgarian (cf. table). The transitional nature of the dialect is further demonstrated by the reflexes of the Proto-Slavic *tʲ/*dʲ: from the typically Bulgarian щ/жд (ʃt/ʒd) in the Blagoevgrad-Petrich dialect and the far East of the Maleshevo dialect, along the border with Bulgaria, through the transitional шч/жџ (ʃtʃ//dʒ/) in the central parts, and to the typically Macedonian ќ/ѓ (c/ɟ) in the western parts of the Maleshevo dialect

Audio samples of the Maleševo-Pirin dialect
About the activist Ǵorǵi Pop Stojanov's struggle against the Ottomans
Excerpt from speech by a man from the Maleševo region

Stealing the cursed maize
Excerpt from speech by a man from the city of Berovo

About the wicked Reverend Eftim
Excerpt from speech by a man from Vladimirovo

== Other phonological characteristics ==
- shortening of words
- use of the old consonant group caf- instead of the consonant group cv-: цев- цаф (cev, 'pipe')
- use of /v/ at the beginning of the word as in Bulgarian instead of /j/ as in Macedonian: важе ('rope')

== Morphological characteristics ==
- use of the preposition sos: – сос рака ('with the hand');
- the clitic possessive forms follow the verb: му рече – рече му ('He told him');
- use of the dative form with na: на нас ни рече ( na nas ni reche, 'He told us')
- the form of the verb to be for third person plural is sa as in Bulgarian, instead of se as in Macedonian: тие се – тие/тия са ('those are'), они са ('they are')
- use of the pronouns on, ona, ono, oni (он, она, оно, они) instead of toj, tja, to, te
