= Ser-Drama-Lagadin-Nevrokop dialect =

East South Slavic dialect

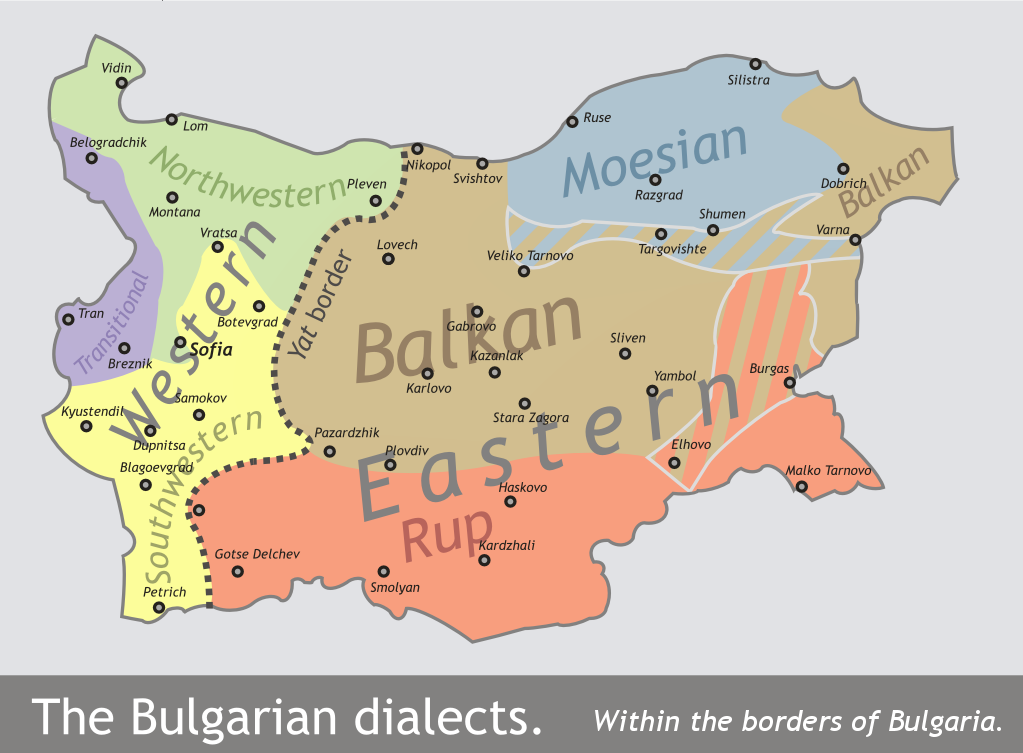
The Ser-Drama-Lagadin-Nevrokop dialect within Bulgaria, in the Rup subgroup of the Eastern dialects

The Ser-Drama-Lagadin-Nevrokop dialect is a dialect currently treated both in the contexts of the southeastern group of Bulgarian dialects and the southeastern subgroup of dialects of the Macedonian. Prior to the codification of standard Macedonian in 1945, the dialects of Macedonia were classified as Bulgarian. The dialect is dynamic and is well known for the shortening of the words, and also characterised by the excessive use of /ʲa/ for the Proto-Slavic yat even in cases where standard Bulgarian has /ɛ/, a feature which is typical for a number of dialects spoken in southern and southwestern Bulgaria (e.g. the Thracian dialect). The Ser-Drama-Lagadin-Nevrokop dialect is closely related to the neighbouring dialects. It is closer to all Eastern Bulgarian dialects than to all Western. Macedonian shares much less features with the dialect than it does with the Maleševo-Pirin dialect of Macedonian and Bulgarian. Some Bulgarian dialects are more similar to Macedonian than the Ser-Nevrokop dialect, the Samokov dialect shares more features with Macedonian than both the Ser-Nevrokop and the Pirin-Malasevo dialects do, even though it is not considered a Macedonian dialect, most of the western Bulgarian dialects and the Smolyan dialect share more similarities with Macedonian than the Ser dialect does. The Samokov dialect, most remarkably, shares with Macedonian and the Maleševo-Pirin dialect—the "to be" verb for future tense—"ke", which in contrast is "shte" in the Ser-Nevrokop dialect and in the Bulgarian language. The Yat border passes through the Maleševo-Pirin dialect and divides it on such a way that in the northern area of the dialect the yat is pronounced "e" (as in all the Western Bulgarian dialects and Macedonian) and in the south—"ya" (as in the Eastern Bulgarian dialects and standard Bulgarian). In the Ser-Nevrokop dialect the yat is pronounced in most places "ya", therefore the city of Serres, after which the dialect is named, is called "Syar" by the locals, as opposed to "Ser" in Macedonian. The first person singular is as in Bulgarian, ending with "a" or "am" as opposed to the constant "am" in Macedonian and the Bulgarian Smolyan dialect. The words for man -"m'zh" and for a dream "s'n" are as in Bulgarian, unlike the Macedonian "mazh" and "son". The words for night and tear—"nosht" and "s'lza" are as the Bulgarian, unlike the Macedonian "nok" and "solza".

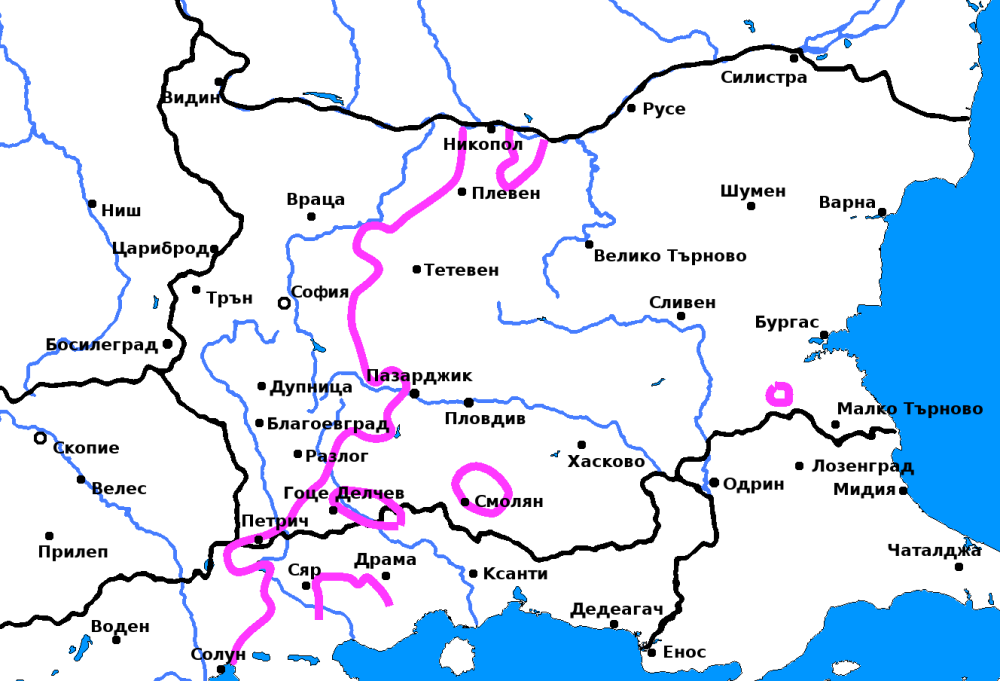
Yat border

The Serres-Nevrokop dialect is treated both in the contexts of Bulgarian and Macedonian dialectology. As described in the section about its range, the vast majority of its speakers identify as Bulgarians. In the context of Bulgarian dialectology, the dialect is situated East of the Yat boundary and thus is considered to belong to the Eastern Bulgarian dialects, more exactly to the Rup subgroup

The previous range of the dialect included vast areas of northeastern Greece, in what is today known as Eastern Macedonia and Thrace. However, considering the mass migration towards Bulgaria in the period from 1912 to 1926, it is unclear to what extent, and if at all, the dialect is preserved in Greece. The only certain region where it is currently spoken is the southeastern quarter of Pirin Macedonia, i.e. in the town of Gotse Delchev and the surrounding municipalities.

== Relationship to standard Bulgarian and standard Macedonian ==
The Serres-Nevrokop dialect possesses features (cf. table) which are typical for the Eastern Bulgarian dialects, including я/е (ʲa/ɛ) reflexes of Old Church Slavonic ѣ, щ/жд (ʃt/ʒd) reflexes of Proto-Slavic *tʲ/*dʲ, ъ (ə) reflex of Old Church Slavonic ѫ (yus) and ъ, ръ (rə)/лъ (lə) reflexes of Old Church Slavonic ръ/рь and лъ/ль, retention of h in the stem, strong vowel reduction, etc. and none of those typical for Macedonian. The following is a table of the main phonological and grammatical features which differentiate standard Bulgarian and standard Macedonian, compared with the corresponding features of the Serres-Nevrokop dialect, as well as two Western Bulgarian dialects.

Comparison of the Serres-Nevrokop dialect with Standard Bulgarian and Standard Macedonian

| Parameter | Serres-Nevrokop dialect | Standard Bulgarian (based on Eastern Bulgarian) | Standard Macedonian | Dupnitsa dialect | Samokov dialect | English |
|---|---|---|---|---|---|---|
| Proto-Slavic *tʲ/*dʲ—Old Church Slavonic щ/жд (ʃt/ʒd) | щ/жд (ʃt/ʒd)—леща/между | щ/жд (ʃt/ʒd)—леща/между | ќ/ѓ (c/ɟ)—леќа/меѓу | щ/жд (ʃt/ʒd)—леща/между | щ/жд (ʃt/ʒd)—леща/между | lentils/between |
| Proto-Slavic *ɡt/kt—Old Church Slavonic щ (ʃt) | щ (ʃt)—нощ | щ (ʃt)—нощ | ќ (c)—ноќ | щ (ʃt)—нощ | щ (ʃt)—нощ | night |
| Old Church Slavonic ѣ (yat) | я/е (ʲa/ɛ)—бял/бели, sometimes even я/я (ʲa/ʲa)—бял/бяли (Drama) | я/е (ʲa/ɛ)—бял/бели | е (ɛ)—бел/бели | е (ɛ)—бел/бели | е (ɛ)—бел/бели | white |
| Old Church Slavonic ѫ (yus), approx. ɔ̃ | ъ (ə)—мъж | ъ (ə)—мъж | а (a)—маж | а (a)—маж | а (a)—маж | man |
| Old Church Slavonic ъ (ə) | ъ (ə)—сън | ъ (ə)—сън | о (ɔ)—сон | о (ɔ)—сон | а (a)—сан | dream |
| Old Church Slavonic ръ/рь | ръ/ър (rə/ər)—връх, кръф | ръ/ър (rə/ər)—връх, кръв | vocalic r—врв, крв | vocalic r—врх, крф | vocalic r—врх, крф | summit, blood |
| Old Church Slavonic лъ/ль | ъл (əl)—сълза | лъ/ъл (lə/əl)—сълза | oл (ɔl)—солза | vocalic l/ъ (ə)—слза/съза depending on region | у (u)—суза | tear |
| Old Church Slavonic x /x/ | Preserved—бях, хубаво | Preserved—бях, хубаво | Lost or replaced by ф/в (f/v)—бев, убаво | Preserved—бех, убаво | Preserved—бех, убаво | was, nice |
| Vowel reduction | Yes | Yes | No | No | No | |
| Definite article | Single definite article—момчето | Single definite article—момчето | Triple definite article—момчето, момчево, момчено | Single definite article—момчето | Single definite article—момчето | the boy |
| Ending of verbs in 1st person sing. present time | а (я)—1st and 2nd conjugation, ам (ям)—3rd—чета, пиша | а (я)—1st and 2nd conjugation, ам (ям)—3rd—чета, пиша | only ам—читам, пишувам | а—1st and 2nd conjugation, ам—3rd—четем, пишем | only (и/е)м—четем, пишем | (I) read, (I) write |
| Formation of past perfect tense | бях + past participle—бях писал, бях молил | бях + past participle—бях писал, бях молил | имам + past passive aorist participle—имам пишано, имам молено | бeх + past participle—бех писал, бех молил | бех + past participle—бех писал, бeх молил | (I) had read, (I) had written |
| Word stress | Dynamic—доби́тък, пера́ | Dynamic—доби́тък, пера́ | Fixed antepenultimate—до́биток, пе́рам | Dynamic—доби́ток, пере́м | Dynamic—доби́ток, пере́м | cattle, (I) wash |

== Past and present range, emigration and expulsion to Bulgaria ==
Before the Balkan Wars, the range of the Serres-Nevrokop dialect was estimated to include the regions of Serres, Drama, Nevrokop and a small part of the Thessaloniki region. This range included approx. 170,000 speakers on the territory of modern Greece (150,000 Christian and 20,000 Muslim Bulgarians or Pomaks) and 25,000 speakers on the territory of modern Bulgaria (10,000 Christians and 15,000 Muslims). However, Kanchov indicates that at least some of these were bilingual and subject to strong Hellenization, including the Slavic population of the towns of Drama, Serres, Lagkadas, as well as of several villages around Lagadina. There was substantial emigration towards Bulgaria even before the Balkan wars, approx. 50,000 Bulgarians from Macedonia lived in Bulgaria in 1900; however, there is no data as to how many of these came from the regions identified above.

The region suffered heavy devastation during the Second Balkan War. A total of 260 Bulgarian villages in the regions of Drama and Serres were set on fire by the advancing Greek troops, with their inhabitants either slaughtered or expelled to Bulgaria. By the end of 1913, Bulgaria had received approx. 50,000 refugees from Greek Macedonia, the vast majority of them from the most affected regions of Kilkis, Serres and Drama. Emigration continued in 1914 and during and after World War I. Additional 60,000 to 90,000 Bulgarians from Greek Macedonia (out of 90,000 to 120,000 people, 32,000 of which were from Western Thrace) emigrated to Bulgaria at the beginning of the 1920s according to the Mollov-Kafandaris Agreement.

Thus, refugees from Greek Macedonia comprised at least 110,000 to 140,000 of the 250,000 officially registered Bulgarian refugees between 1912 and 1916, or slightly more than a third to slightly less than half of the pre-war Christian Bulgarian (referred to as ethnic Macedonian in the Republic of Macedonia) population of Greek Macedonia identified at approx. 320,000 by Kanchov. Considering that the number of refugees from Eastern Thrace and Western Thrace was approx. 50,000 and slightly more than 30,000, respectively, and that there were no mass expulsions from Serbian Macedonia and Southern Dobruja, the number of refugees from Greek Macedonia was probably higher. Furthermore, the data from the Bulgarian refugee agency includes only officially registered refugees and omits people who did not register as such.

According to Hugh Poulton, the patterns of migration to Bulgaria differed across the different parts of Greek Macedonia. The majority of the Slavs roughly East of the Vardar (including the region where the Serres-Nevrokop dialect was spoken) either fled or, later, immigrated to Bulgaria, whereas the majority of the Slavs West of Vardar remained in Greece and only a minority resettled to Bulgaria. The large-scale migration is corroborated by the data collected during the Bulgarian occupation of northeastern Greece during World War II.

The Bulgarian authorities counted only 37,000 Bulgarians during the 1941 census in the Bulgarian-occupied zone (which practically coincided with the range of the Serres-Nevrokop dialect), even including bilingual persons and returnees from Bulgaria, down from more than 170,000 before the Balkan Wars. According to the Bulgarian statistics, of approx. 698,000 Bulgarians who immigrated to Bulgaria from 1878 to 1945, 200,000 came from Greek Macedonia, which is equal to between half and two-thirds of the Slavic population of Greek Macedonia before the Balkan Wars. As evidenced above, the vast majority of the refugees and migrants came from the eastern part of Greek Macedonia.

Considering the above, as well as the strong Greek assimilation pressure, evident also before the Balkan Wars, it is generally unlikely for the Serres-Nevrokop dialect to be preserved in any significant numbers in its former territory in Greece. Thus, the only certain present range is in the southeastern part of Pirin Macedonia, as well as among descendants of refugees from the region in other parts of Bulgaria. The overwhelming majority of the speakers of the dialect in Pirin Macedonia identify as Bulgarians, while less than 1.0% of the population of the region (only region-wide data available) identify as ethnic Macedonians.
