= Strumica dialect =

Dialect of Macedonian

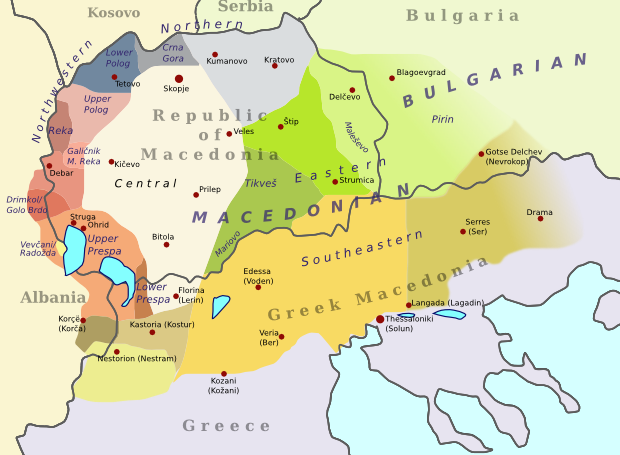
The Strumica dialect on the map of the Macedonian dialects

The Royal Bride
Excerpt from a folk tale told by a woman from Bansko, Strumica region. The tale shares many similarities with Cinderella by Brothers Grimm.

The Strumica (Macedonian: Струмички дијалект, Strumicki dijalekt) is a dialect of Macedonian. It is member of the center subgroup of the eastern group of the Macedonian dialects. This dialect is mainly spoken in the southeastern part of Macedonia, respectively in Strumica and in the surrounding areas. It has maintained vestiges of the Maleševo-Pirin dialect in certain terms of male kinship. The Strumica dialect has a small amount of differential object marking in the vernacular of some speakers who mark topical animate objects, compared to the Debar dialect, where the marking is common in the Macedonian Muslim population. The main characteristic is continuing the vowel.

== Characteristics ==
- Continuing the vowel (каде ќе одиш > дек ќе оош)
- Dropping the vowel (полна > п'лна)
- Use of the preposition у (во градот > у градо)

== Personal Pronouns ==
=== Singular ===
- Јас (I)
- Ти (You)
- Он (He)
- Она (She)
- Оно (It)

=== Plural ===
- Нии (We)
- Вии (You)
- Они (Тии) (They)
