= Chepino dialect =

Dialect of Bulgarian

The Chepino dialect is a Bulgarian dialect of the Rhodopean group of the Rup dialects. Its range includes the northwestern Rhodopes, i.e. the towns of Velingrad, Rakitovo and Kostandovo and the villages of Dragichevo and Dorkovo. Its immediate neighbours are the Central Balkan dialect and the Ihtiman dialect to the north, the Babyak dialect to the west and south and the Hvoyna dialect to the east. The Chepino dialect is spoken by both Orthodox and Muslim Bulgarians in the region irrespective of religious affiliation.

== Phonological and morphological characteristics ==
- Broad e (æ) for Old Church Slavonic yat in a stressed syllable and ordinary e (ɛ) in an unstressed syllable : бæл/бæли vs. formal Bulgarian бял/бели (white) but деца as in Standard Bulgarian (children).
- Single definite article: -oaт, -та, -то, -тæ
- Strong palatalisation of consonants and especially of soft t and d which are sometimes transformed into soft k and g: т҄иква/к҄иква vs. formal Bulgarian тиква
- Merger of Old Church Slavonic big yus ѫ, little yus ѧ, ь and ъ into one vowel which is different in the four subdialects of the Chepino dialect:

Velingrad subdialect: Merger of Old Church Slavonic big yus ѫ, little yus ѧ, ь and ъ into broad o (oa) in a stressed syllable and into semi-reduced a in an unstressed syllable: зоап but за'боaт vs. Standard Bulgarian зъп/зъ'бът (tooth/the tooth)
Kostandovo subdialect: Merger of Old Church Slavonic big yus ѫ, little yus ѧ, ь and ъ into broad o (oa) in a stressed syllable and into u in an unstressed syllable: зоап but зу'боат vs. Standard Bulgarian зъп/зъ'бът (tooth/the tooth)
Rakitovo subdialect: Merger of Old Church Slavonic big yus ѫ, little yus ѧ, ь and ъ into broad o (oa) in a stressed syllable and into a in an unstressed syllable: зоап but зa'боат vs. Standard Bulgarian зъп/зъ'бът (tooth/the tooth)
Dorkovo subdialect: Merger of Old Church Slavonic big yus ѫ, little yus ѧ, ь and ъ into broad a in a stressed syllable and into semi-reduced a in an unstressed syllable: зап but зa'бат vs. Standard Bulgarian зъп/зъ'бът (tooth/the tooth)

For other phonological and morphological characteristics typical for all Rup or Rhodopean dialects, cf. Rup dialects.

== Sources ==
Стойков, Стойко: Българска диалектология, Акад. изд. "Проф. Марин Дринов", 2006
