= Dupnitsa dialect =

Dialect of Bulgarian

The Dupnitsa dialect is a Bulgarian dialect, member of the Southwestern Bulgarian dialects, which is spoken in the region of Dupnitsa in central western Bulgaria. It is transitional between the Samokov dialect to the east and the Blagoevgrad-Petrich dialect to the south.

== Phonological and morphological characteristics ==
- щ/жд (ʃt/ʒd) for Proto-Slavic *tʲ/*dʲ (as in Standard Bulgarian) - леща, между (lentils, between). The future tense particle, however, is че: че че'темe vs. Standard Bulgarian ще четем (we will read)
- Vowel a for Old Bulgarian ѫ (yus): маж vs. formal Bulgarian мъж (man). Limited number of u reflexes of yus (as in the Samokov dialect): мука vs. Standard Bulgarian мъка (sorrow)
- Vowel o for Old Bulgarian ъ in suffixes and prefixes and some roots and a in other roots: сос него vs. Standard Bulgarian със него (with him), бочва vs. Standard Bulgarian бъчва (cask) but вашка vs. Standard Bulgarian въшка (louse)
- Vocalic r for Old Bulgarian ръ/рь instead of the combination ръ/ър (rə/ər) in Standard Bulgarian - дрво instead of дърво (tree).
- The reflex of Old Bulgarian лъ/ль is:

Before non-labial consonants - schwa (ə) in the southern subdialect and vocalic l in the northern subdialect: съза/слза vs. formal Bulgarian сълза
Before labial consonants - u: вуна vs. formal Bulgarian вълна (wool)

- Preserved consonant х (x) in all positions, except the beginning of the word: чух (I heard), оди (walks)
- Verb ending -м in verbs of the first and second conjugation: чет'ем vs. formal Bulgarian чет'ъ (I read)
- Adverbial participle on -ейки/айки (as in Standard Bulgarian): играейки (while playing)
- Dynamic stress

For other phonological and morphological characteristics typical for all Southwestern dialects, cf. Southwestern Bulgarian dialects.

== Sources ==
Стойков, Стойко: Българска диалектология, Акад. изд. "Проф. Марин Дринов", 2006 Стойков, Стойко: карти
