= Vladimirovo, Berovo =

Vladimirovo Владимирово
- Village
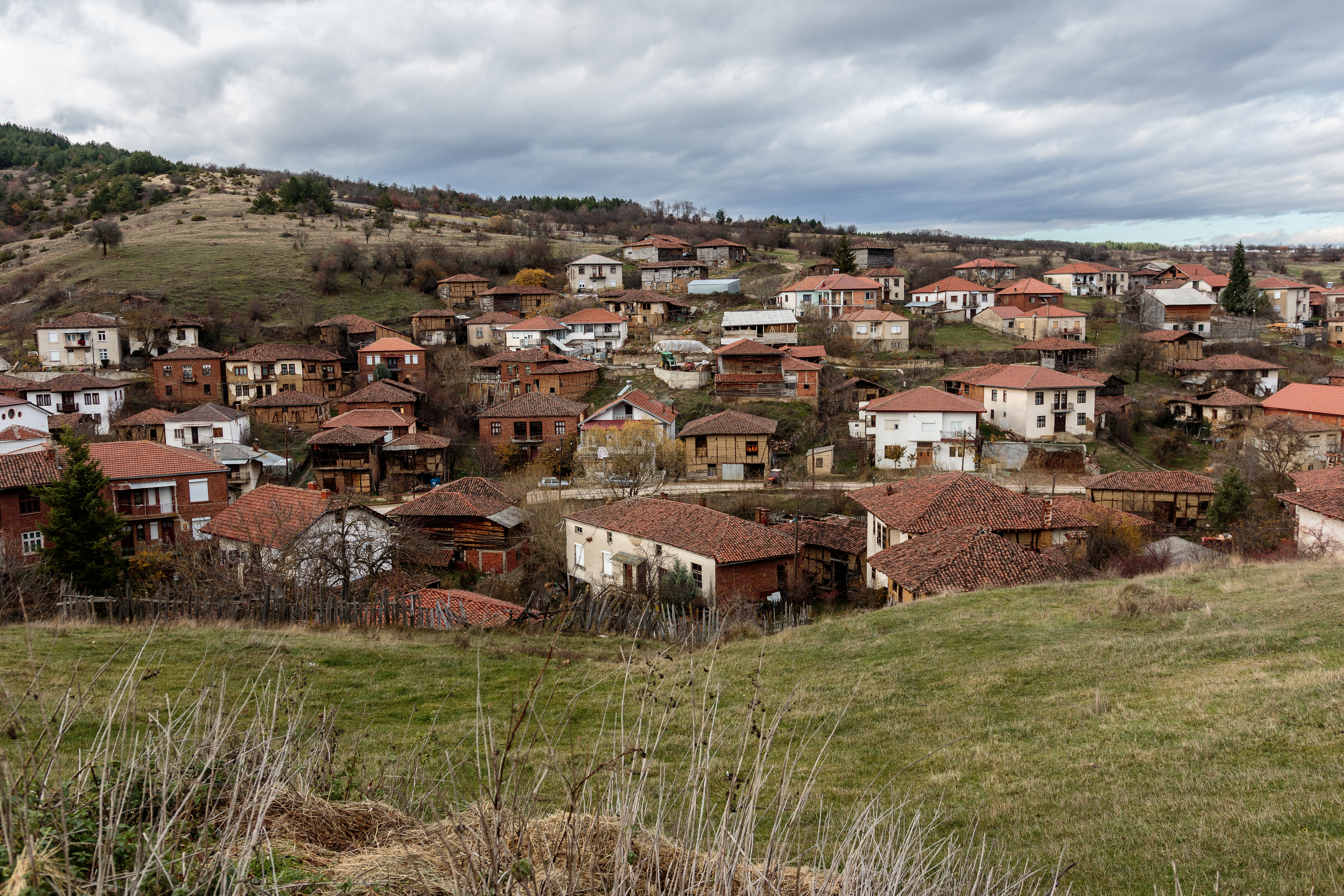
- Panoramic view of the village

- Location within North Macedonia
- Country: North Macedonia
- Region: Eastern
- Municipality: Berovo

Population (2002)
  - Total: 861
- Time zone: UTC+1 (CET)

Vladimirovo (Macedonian: Ладимерово) is a village in the Berovo Municipality of North Macedonia.

== Demographics ==
According to the 2002 census, the village had a total of 861 inhabitants. Ethnic groups in the village include:

- Macedonians 859
- Serbs 2
