= Strandzha dialect =

Dialect of Bulgarian

The Strandzha dialect is a dialect of the Bulgarian language, member of the Rup or Southeastern Bulgarian dialects. The present range of the dialect includes the Bulgarian part of Strandzha. In the past, the dialect was spoken on a much larger territory and extended far down into Eastern Thrace, now in Turkey. Following the Balkan Wars, the Bulgarian population there was forced to flee to Bulgaria, settling mostly in the regions of Burgas and Varna in eastern Bulgaria.

== Phonological and morphological characteristics ==
- Existence of long soft consonants л /l/, н /n/, к /k/ and г /ɡ/: сиренн҄е vs. formal Bulgarian сирене (cheese)
- Transition of soft t and d into soft k and g (also typical for the Kotel-Elena-Dryanovo dialect, cf. article): вæжг҄и vs. formal Bulgarian вежди (eyebrows)
- The masculine definite article is -ът after a hard syllable and -ет after a soft syllable: гърбът, мъжет vs. formal Bulgarian гърбът, мъжът (the back, the man)
- A number of lexical peculiarities, e.g. потон vs. common Bulgarian под (floor)

For other phonological and morphological characteristics that are typical for all Rup dialects, cf. article.

== Sources ==
Стойков, Стойко: Българска диалектология, Акад. изд. "Проф. Марин Дринов", 2006
