= Victor Friedman =

American linguist

- Born: October 18, 1949 (age 76); Chicago, Illinois, U.S.
- Occupations: Professor, author, researcher and linguist
- Known for: Linguistics, Slavic languages and literatures

Victor A. Friedman (born October 18, 1949) is an American linguist and Slavist. He is the Andrew W. Mellon Distinguished Service Professor in Humanities at the University of Chicago. He holds an appointment in the Department of Linguistics and an associate appointment in the Department of Anthropology. He has published numerous articles in English, Macedonian, and Albanian.

== Career ==
Friedman was born in Chicago into a family of descendants of Jewish immigrants from the Russian Empire and Romania. He received his B.A. in Russian language and literature at Reed College in 1970. Friedman's PhD was in Slavic languages and literatures and in general linguistics at the University of Chicago in 1975. His dissertation, The Grammatical Categories of the Macedonian Indicative, was the first publication about modern Macedonian in the U.S. and won the Mark Perry Galler Prize for best dissertation in the Humanities Division at Chicago.

From 1975 until 1993, Friedman taught at the University of North Carolina, where he served as department chairman. In 1993, he was appointed to a professorship at the University of Chicago. He has held visiting positions at Cornell University, the University of Skopje, the Central European University in Budapest, Kyoto University, the University of Helsinki, the University of Pristina, the National University of Malaysia and La Trobe University. His expertise extends over all languages of the Balkans and the Caucasus, including Albanian, Aromanian, Azeri, Bulgarian, Georgian, Greek, Judezmo, Lak, Macedonian, Romanian, Romani, Russian, Serbo-Croatian, Tadjik, and Turkish. His research has been multidisciplinary and has involved extensive fieldwork in the Balkans.

In 1994 he served as a senior policy and political analyst to the United Nations regarding policy in the former Yugoslavia, and since then he has been involved in other consultative roles in the region.

== Awards and honors ==
- "1300 Years of Bulgaria" jubilee medal (1982)
- University of Skopje Gold Plaque (1981, 2003, 2007)
- Member of the Macedonian Academy of Arts and Sciences (1994)
- Member of Matica Srpska (1995)
- Member of the Academy of Arts and Sciences of Kosovo (2004)
- Member of the Academy of Sciences of the Republic of Albania (2006)
- Doctor Honoris Causa, University of Skopje (2007)
- John Simon Guggenheim Fellowship (2008–09)
- Annual Award for Outstanding Contributions to Scholarship, American Association of Teachers of Slavic and East European Languages (2009)
- World Prize of Humanism (2013)
- Annual Award for Distinguished Contributions to Slavic, East European, and Eurasian Studies Award, Association for Slavic, East European, and Eurasian Studies (2014)

== Selected publications ==
- Macedonian (2002) - http://www.seelrc.org:8080/grammar/pdf/compgrammar_macedonian.pdf
- Turkish in Macedonia and Beyond: Studies in Contact, Typology, and Other Phenomena in the Balkans and the Caucasus (2003)
- Studies on Albanian and Other Balkan Languages (2004)
- Očerki laksogo jazyka (2011)
- Makedonistički studii 1 (2011) - http://drmj.manu.edu.mk/wp-content/uploads/2018/01/Македонистички-студии_В.-Фридман.pdf
- Makedonistički studii 2 (2015) - http://drmj.manu.edu.mk/wp-content/uploads/2018/01/Macedonian_Studies2_V.Friedman.pdf
- The Balkan Languages (with Brian Joseph, 2025) - https://www.cambridge.org/core/books/balkan-languages/DF1897CA3A024BFF3AB73392CD28822E
