= Thracian dialect =

Dialect of Bulgarian

The Thracian dialect is a dialect of the Bulgarian language, member of the Rup or Southeastern Bulgarian dialects. The present range of the dialect includes the regions of Haskovo, Parvomay, Elhovo, Harmanli, Svilengrad, Topolovgrad and Ivaylovgrad. In the past, the dialect was spoken on a much larger territory and extended far down into Eastern and Western Thrace, now in Turkey and Greece, respectively. Following the Balkan Wars, the Bulgarian population there was forced to flee to Bulgaria, settling mostly in the regions of Burgas and Haskovo, Yambol and Plovdiv.

== Phonological and morphological characteristics ==
- Lack of consonants дж /dʒ/ and дз /dz/ /ʒ/ and /z/ are pronounced instead: жам vs. джам ('windowpane')
- Disappearance of /t/ from the consonant group /str/: сесра vs. formal Bulgarian сестра ('sister')
- Personal pronouns нега vs. formal Bulgarian него ('him') and хми vs. formal Bulgarian им
- Future tense particles жъ, шъ, зъ in the northern subdialect and ке in the southern subdialect vs. formal Bulgarian ще

For other phonological and morphological characteristics that are typical for all Rup dialects, see Rup dialects.

== Sources ==
Стойков, Стойко: Българска диалектология, Акад. изд. "Проф. Марин Дринов", 2006
