= Hvoyna dialect =

Dialect of Bulgarian

The Hvoyna dialect is a Bulgarian dialect of the Rhodopean group of the Rup dialects. Its range includes the northern part of the Central Rhodopes and the town of Batak in the Western Rhodopes. Its immediate neighbours are the Central Balkan dialect to the north, the Smolyan dialect to the south and the Rhodopean Chepino dialect to the west.

== Phonological and morphological characteristics ==
- Merger of Old Church Slavonic big yus ѫ, little yus ѧ, ь and ъ into ъ (ə) in a stressed syllable and into a slightly reduced a in an unstressed syllable: къшта (as in formal Bulgarian – house), клʲътва vs. formal Bulgarian клетва (oath)
- Broad e (æ) for Old Church Slavonic yat in all positions and regardless of the word stress and the character of the following syllable: бæл/бæли vs. formal Bulgarian бял/бели (white), голʲæм/голʲæми vs. formal Bulgarian голям/големи (big). The broad e has also replaced Old Bulgarian я in all positions: доашʲтʲерʲæ vs. formal Bulgarian дъштерʲа (daughter)
- Triple definite article: -ът, -та, -то, -тæ for general cases, -ъс, -са, -со, -сæ for objects situated close to the speaker and -ън, -на, -но, -нæ for objects situated far from the speaker. The Batak subdialect, however, has a single definite article, as in formal Bulgarian
- A number of well-preserved case forms: common oblique case forms for family and personal names (as in the Central Balkan dialect, cf. article); dative forms for sing. nouns: сину vs. formal Bulgarian на сина, etc.

For other phonological and morphological characteristics typical for all Rup or Rhodopean dialects, cf. Rup dialects.

== Sources ==
Стойков, Стойко: Българска диалектология, Акад. изд. "Проф. Марин Дринов", 2006
