= Southwestern Bulgarian dialects =

Group of dialects of Bulgarian

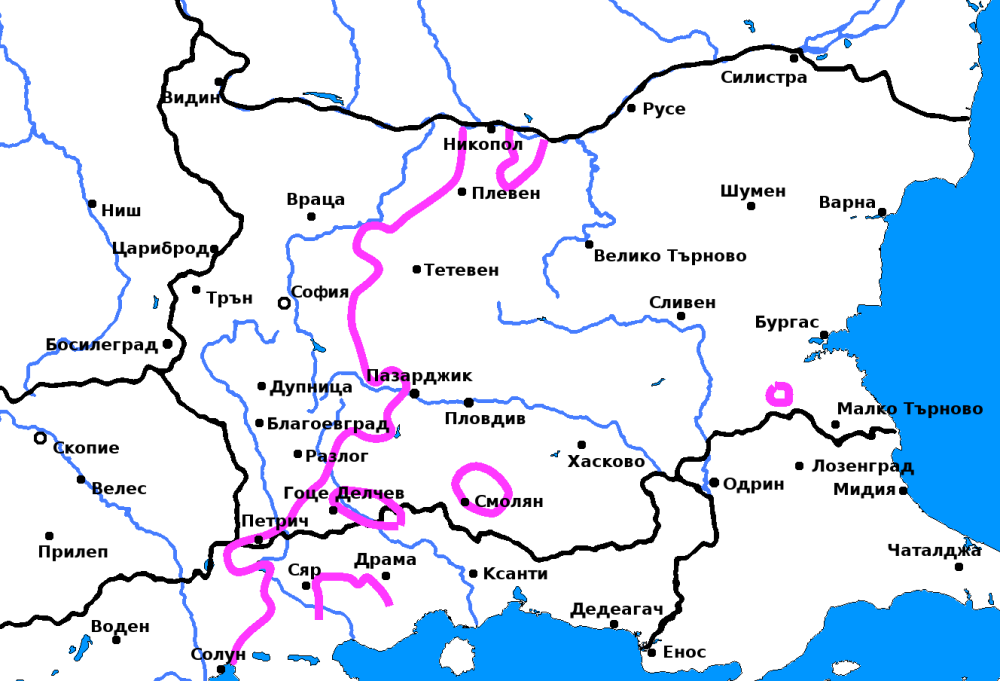
Yat border in the Bulgarian language

The Southwestern Bulgarian dialects are a group of Bulgarian dialects which are located west of the yat boundary and are part of the Western Bulgarian dialects. The range of the Southwestern dialects on the territory of Bulgaria includes most of west central and southwestern Bulgaria. The Southwestern dialects border on the Northwestern dialects to the north, the Transitional dialects to the northwest and the Balkan dialects and the Rup dialects to the northeast and southeast, respectively. If the Macedonian language is regarded as a third literary form of Modern Bulgarian, then the Southwestern dialects extend west and southwest to include the Slavic dialects in Vardar Macedonia and the western half of Greek Macedonia. Should the Macedonian language be counted as a separate language, then the southernmost dialect of the group, the Blagoevgrad-Petrich or Pirin dialect, along with the corresponding variety on the Macedonian side of the border, the Maleshevo dialect, constitute a transitional dialect between Bulgarian and Macedonian. A defining characteristic of the Southwestern dialects is the gradual transition from one dialect to another, as well as to dialects which belong to other dialectal groups. For example, the Dupnitsa dialect is transitional to both the Samokov dialect and the Blagoevgrad-Petrich dialect.

== Phonological and morphological characteristics ==
- Old Church Slavonic ѣ (yat) is always pronounced as ɛ vs. formal Bulgarian я/е (ʲa~ɛ) – бел/бели (white, white pl.)
- щ~жд (ʃt~ʒd) for Proto-Slavic *tʲ~*dʲ (as in Standard Bulgarian) - леща, между (lentils, between). The future tense particle is, however, different in the different dialects: ще, ше, че, к҄е, к҄у

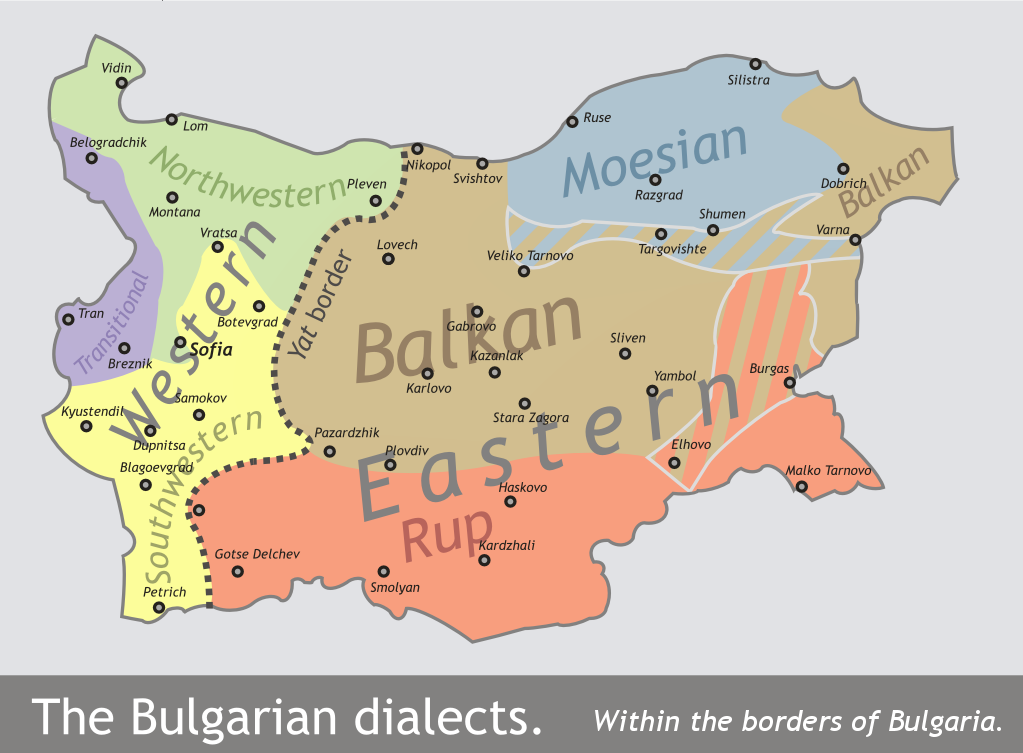
Map of the Bulgarian dialects within Bulgaria

- The reflex of Old Church Slavonic ѫ (yus) is generally a, with the exception of the Sofia dialect where it is ъ (ə): каща vs. formal Bulgarian къща (house)
- The reflex of Old Church Slavonic ъ gradually shifts from north to south from only a to both a and o. The northern dialects (e.g. the Vratsa dialect) have only a, the central ones (e.g. the Ihtiman dialect) have mostly a with occurrences of o only in certain suffixes and prefixes, the southern ones (e.g. the Maleševo-Pirin dialect) have only o in suffixes and prefixes and some roots and a in other roots
- Preserved transition of o into e after ж /ʒ/, ш /ʃ/, ч /t͡ʃ/: ножеве vs. formal Bulgarian ножове (knives)
- Single masculine definite article -o (as in the Moesian dialects) or a (as in the Balkan Pirdop dialect), depending on the dialect: гар'бо/гар'бa vs. Standard Bulgarian гър'бът (the back).
- Widespread formation of past passive participles with -н: чуен vs. formal Bulgarian чут (heard)
- Suffix -чки instead of -шки for formation of certain adjectives: човечки vs. човешки

== Sources ==
Стойков, Стойко: Българска диалектология, Акад. изд. "Проф. Марин Дринов", 2006
