= Smolyan dialect =

Dialect of Bulgarian

The Smolyan dialect or Central Rhodope dialect is a Bulgarian dialect of the Rhodopean group of the Rup dialects. Its range includes most of the Central Rhodopes, i.e. the region of Smolyan. Its immediate neighbours are the Rhodopean Hvoyna dialect to the north, the Serres-Nevrokop dialect and the Razlog dialect to the west and the Turkish dialects of the Turkish population in the Eastern Rhodopes. To the south, the Smolyan dialect crosses the Greek-Bulgarian border and is spoken by much of the Muslim Bulgarian (Pomak) population in Western Thrace. As a result of the rugged mountainous terrain and the century-long isolation of the region from the rest of the country, the Smolyan dialect is the most idiosyncratic of all Bulgarian dialects and is not readily understandable even for its immediate neighbours.

== Phonological and morphological characteristics ==
- The most important phonological characteristic of the Smolyan dialect is the existence of broad o (oa), which is pronounced approximately as the long Swedish a but without the length, i.e. as a broad open o which resembles the vowel a at the end of its articulation. Old Church Slavonic big yus ѫ, little yus ѧ, ь and ъ have all merged into the open o in the Smolyan dialect, when they are in a stressed syllable: зɒб vs. formal Bulgarian зъб (tooth), з҄ɒт vs. formal Bulgarian зет (son-in-law), зɒлва vs. formal Bulgarian зълва (sister-in-law). When the four vowels are in an unstressed syllable, they have merged into a slightly reduced a
- Broad e (æ) for Old Church Slavonic yat in all positions and regardless of the word stress and the character of the following syllable: бæл ~ бæли vs. formal Bulgarian бял ~ бели (white), голʲæм ~ голʲæми vs. formal Bulgarian голям ~ големи (big). An archaic trait, as the broad e is considered to be the original pronunciation of Old Church Slavonic yat. The broad e has also replaced Old Bulgarian я in all positions: дɒшʲтʲерʲæ vs. formal Bulgarian дъштерʲа (daughter)
- Old Bulgarian groups ър, ьр and ъл, ьл are pronounced only as ър ~ ъл, i.e. as ɒр/ɒл: вɒрх vs. formal Bulgarian връх (summit) жʲɒлт vs. formal Bulgarian жълт (yellow)
- Preservation of Old Bulgarian vowel ы (ɨ) in the southern subdialect: сын vs. formal Bulgarian син (son). An archaic trait, as (ɨ) is considered to be the original pronunciation of Old Church Slavonic ꙑ
- Articulation of unstressed o as a (the so-called akanye) as in Russian, Belarusian and other Slavic languages: кабила vs. formal Bulgarian кобила (mare)
- Triple definite article: -oaт, -та, -то, -тæ for general cases, -oaс, -са, -со, -сæ for objects situated close to the speaker and -oaн, -на, -но, -нæ for objects situated far from the speaker
- A number of well-preserved case forms: common oblique case forms for family and personal names (as in the Central Balkan dialect, cf. article); dative forms for sing. nouns: сину vs. formal Bulgarian на сина, etc.
- Verb ending -м for verbs in 1st and 2nd conjugation: ход҄ам vs. formal Bulgarian ход҄а (I walk)
- A number of lexical idiosyncrasies: галеница vs. formal Bulgarian любовница (female lover)

For other phonological and morphological characteristics typical for all Rup or Rhodopean dialects, cf. Rup dialects.

== Sources ==
Стойков, Стойко: Българска диалектология, Акад. изд. "Проф. Марин Дринов", 2006
