= Pirin Macedonia =

Blagoevgrad Province of Bulgaria

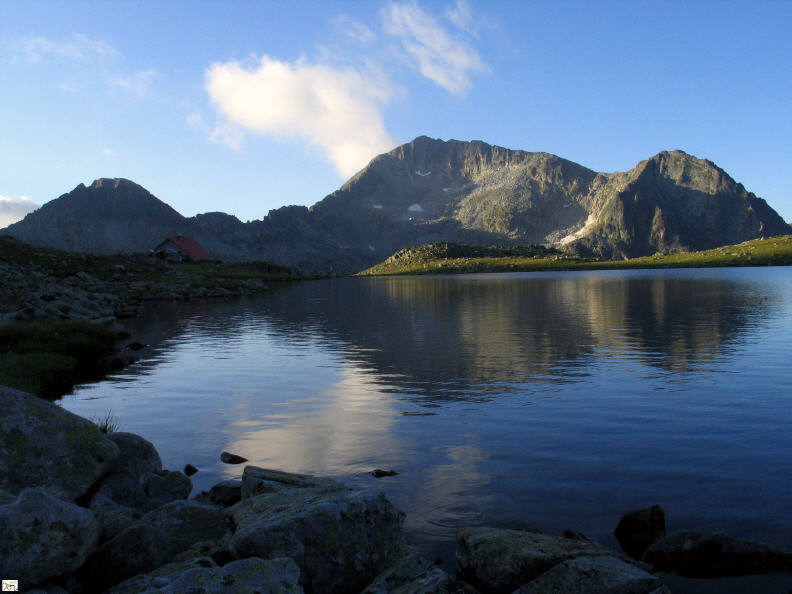
Tevno Lake in Pirin Mountain

Pirin Macedonia on the map of Bulgaria

Pirin Macedonia or Bulgarian Macedonia (Bulgarian: Пиринска Македония or Българска Македония, romanized: Pirinska Makedoniya or Bulgarska Makedoniya), which today is in southwestern Bulgaria, is the third-biggest part of the geographical region of Macedonia. This part coincides with the borders of Blagoevgrad Province, as well as the surrounding area of Barakovo from Kyustendil Province. After World War I, Strumica and the surrounding area were broken away from the region and were ceded to Yugoslavia.

It covers an area of about 6,798 km^{2}, which is 10.18% of the geographical region of Macedonia. One of the regional centers is Blagoevgrad. The region borders Kyustendil Province and Sofia Province to the north, Pazardzhik Province and Smolyan Province to the east, Greece to the south, and North Macedonia to the west. The population is estimated around 290,000 people.

== Etymology ==
The name of this region comes from the Pirin Mountains which are spread in the central part of Pirin Macedonia. The mountain name Pirin comes from Perun (Bulgarian: Перун), the highest god of the Slavic pantheon and the god of thunder and lightning. Orbelos is today Belasica.

== History ==
It usually refers to the part of the region of Macedonia attributed to the Kingdom of Bulgaria by the Treaty of Bucharest (1913). Until World War I, the region included the areas of present-day Strumica and Novo Selo Municipality, today in North Macedonia. After World War I, they were broken away from Bulgaria and ceded to the Kingdom of Yugoslavia.

== Religion ==
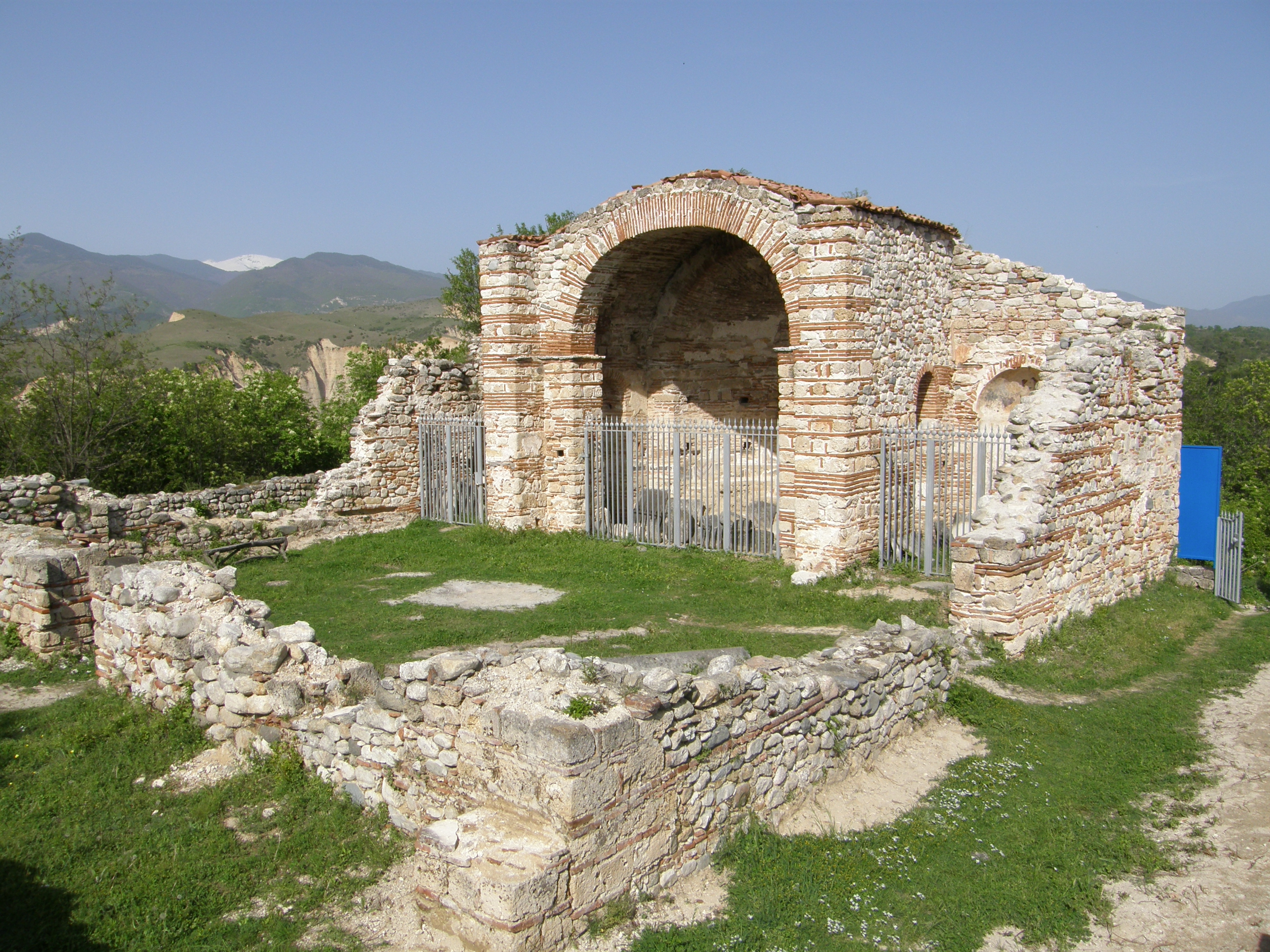
Saint Nicholas Church, in Melnik (12th century)

The main religion in the region of Pirin Macedonia is Christianity, with majority of population belonging to the Bulgarian Orthodox Church. During the early centuries of Christianity this region belonged to the ancient Roman province of Macedonia, and later it was under the jurisdiction of the Archbishopric of Ohrid, up to the 1767. During the period of Ottoman rule, a partial islamization was also recorded. In the middle of the 19th century a Bulgarian national revival was initiated, and the newly created Bulgarian Exarchate also included the region of Pirin Macedonia.

== See also ==
- Aegean Macedonia
- Macedonia (region)
- Vardar Macedonia
