= Ihtiman dialect =

Dialect of Bulgarian

The Ihtiman dialect is a Bulgarian dialect, member of the Southwestern Bulgarian dialects, which is spoken in the regions of Ihtiman, Kostenets and Septemvri in central western Bulgaria. It is transitional between the Botevgrad and Samokov dialect.

== Phonological and morphological characteristics ==
- Vowel a for Old Church Slavonic ѫ (yus), ь and ъ: маж vs. formal Bulgarian мъж (man), сан vs. formal Bulgarian сън (sleep). o for Old Church Slavonic ъ exists only in the preposition and prefix въз
- Schwa (ə) for Old Church Slavonic лъ/ль before non-labial consonants and u before labial consonants (as in the Samokov dialect): съза vs. formal Bulgarian сълза (tear), вуна vs. formal Bulgarian вълна (wool)
- Lack of soft consonants at the end of the word
- The masculine definite article is -a, as in the Pirdop dialect: кра'ка (the leg)
- Verb ending -a in verbs of the first and second conjugation: чет'а vs. formal Bulgarian чет'ъ (I read)
- Future tense particle is ше and ще (ще in all cases in Standard Bulgarian)
- Personal pronouns for 3rd person той, т҄а, то, те as in Standard Bulgarian

For other phonological and morphological characteristics typical for all Southwestern dialects, cf. Southwestern Bulgarian dialects.

== Sources ==
Стойков, Стойко: Българска диалектология, Акад. изд. "Проф. Марин Дринов", 2006
