= Samokov dialect =

Dialect of Bulgarian

The Samokov dialect is a Bulgarian dialect, member of the Southwestern Bulgarian dialects, which is spoken in the region of Samokov in central western Bulgaria. Its immediate neighbours are the Sofia dialect and Elin Pelin dialect to the north, the Ihtiman dialect to the east, the Dupnitsa dialect to the west and the Razlog dialect to the south.

== Phonological and morphological characteristics ==
- Vowel a for Old Church Slavonic ѫ (yus), ь and ъ: маж vs. formal Bulgarian мъж (man), сан vs. formal Bulgarian сън (sleep).
- Limited number of o reflexes of Old Church Slavonic ъ in the suffix -ък, the prefixes въз and съ and the prepositions във, въз and със: сос него vs. Standard Bulgarian със него (with him), напредок vs. Standard Bulgarian напредък (progress).
- Limited number of u reflexes of yus: мука vs. Standard Bulgarian мъка (sorrow)
- Schwa (ə) for Old Church Slavonic лъ/ль before non-labial consonants and u before labial consonants (as in the Ihtiman dialect): съза vs. formal Bulgarian сълза (tear), вуна vs. formal Bulgarian вълна (wool)
- щ/жд (ʃt/ʒd) for Proto-Slavic *tʲ/*dʲ (as in Standard Bulgarian) - леща, между (lentils, between). The reflex in sevеral villages and partially in the town of Samokov is, however, шч, i.e. лешча
- Presence of soft consonants at the end of the word
- Single masculine definite article -o: гар'бо vs. Standard Bulgarian гър'бът (the back).
- Ending -м in verbs of all conjugations (as in the Sofia dialect): че'тем vs. formal Bulgarian чет'ъ (I read)

For other phonological and morphological characteristics typical for all Southwestern dialects, cf. Southwestern Bulgarian dialects.

== Sources ==
Стойков, Стойко: Българска диалектология, Акад. изд. "Проф. Марин Дринов", 2006
