= Bulgarian dialects =

Overview of dialects of the Bulgarian language

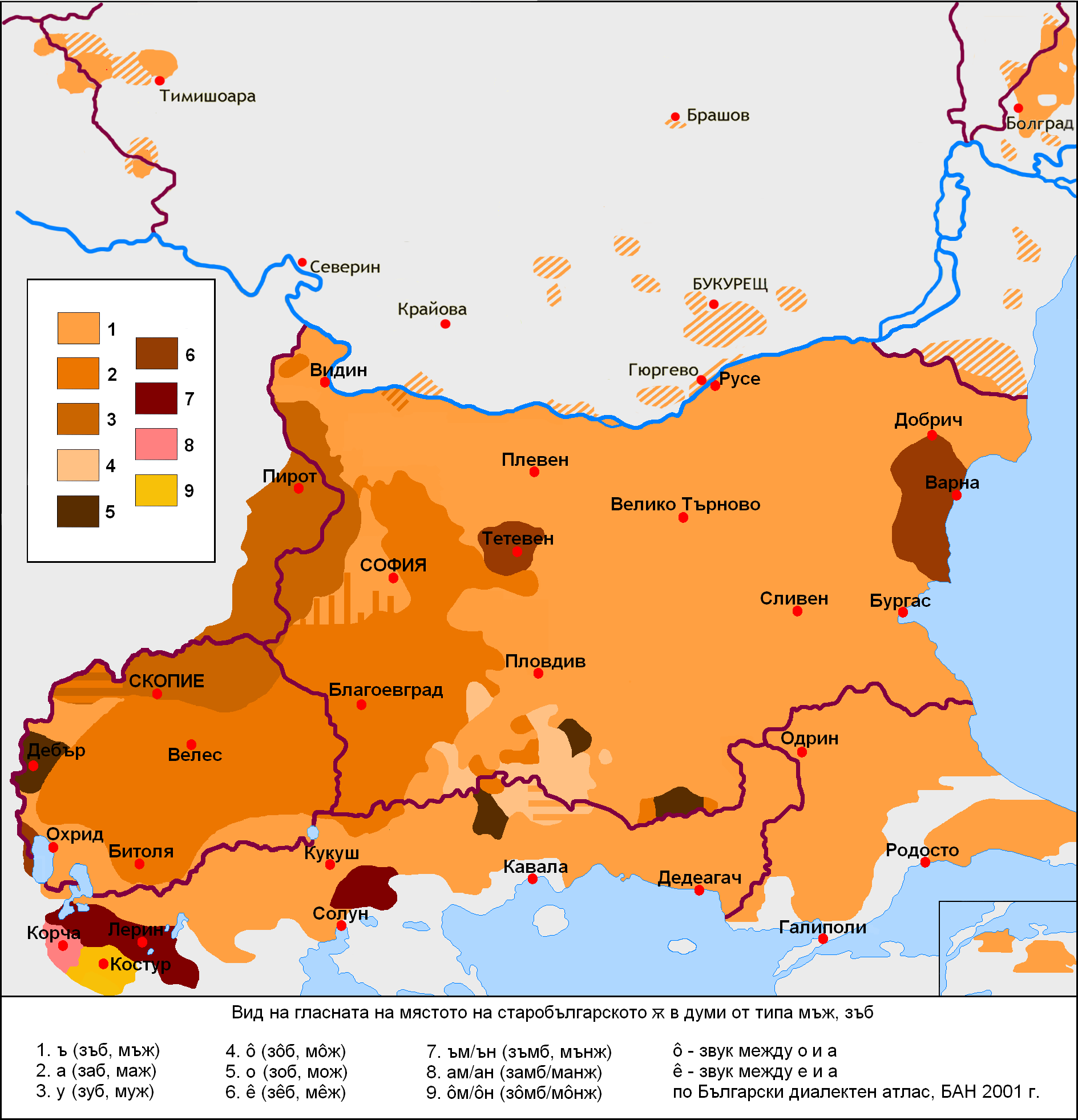
Map of the big yus (*ǫ) isoglosses in Eastern South Slavic and eastern Torlakian according to the Bulgarian Academy of Sciences' atlas from 2001. Pronunciation of man and tooth, derived from Proto-Slavic words *mǫžь and *zǫbъ on the map: 1. [mɤʃ], [zɤp] (see зъб); 2. [maʃ], [zap] (see заб); 3. [muʃ], [zup]; 4. [mɒʃ], [zɒp]; 5. [mɔʃ], [zɔp]; 6. [mæʃ], [zæp]; 7. [mɤnʃ], [zɤmp]; 8. [manʃ], [zamp]; 9. [mɒnʃ], [zɒmp]

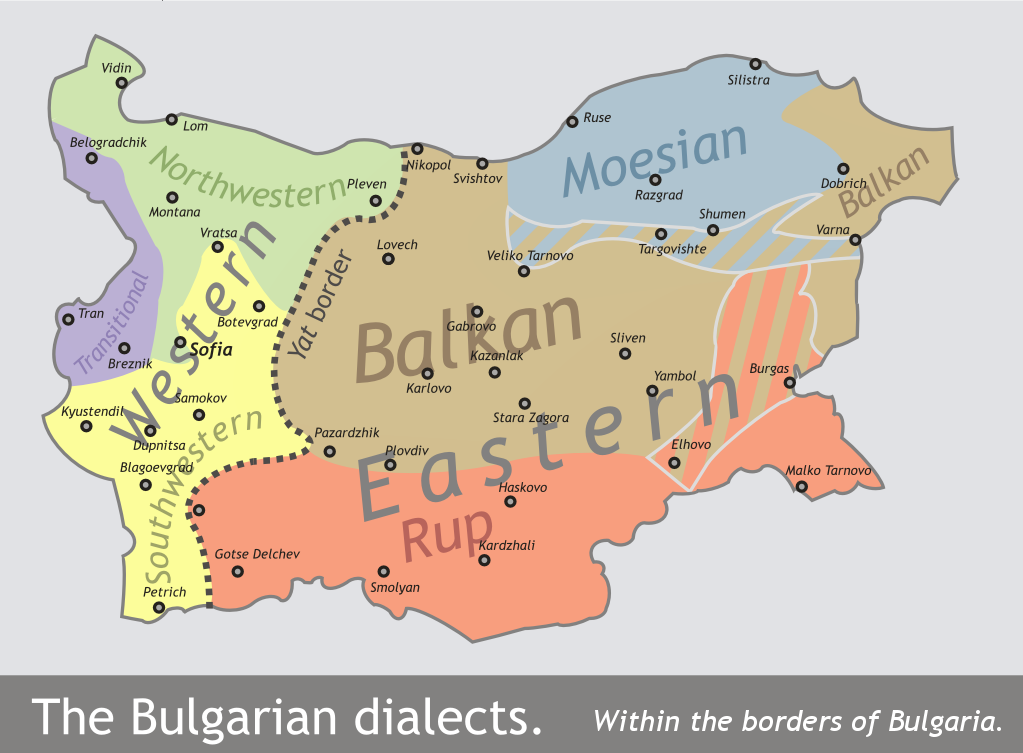
Map of the Bulgarian dialects within Bulgaria

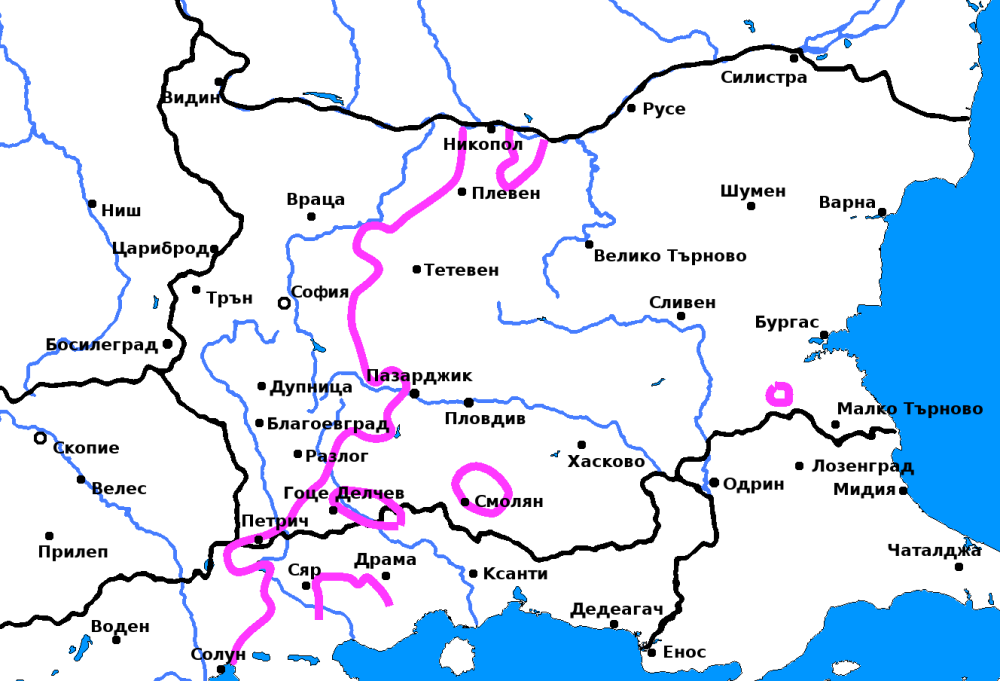
The yat (*ě) split in the Bulgarian language.

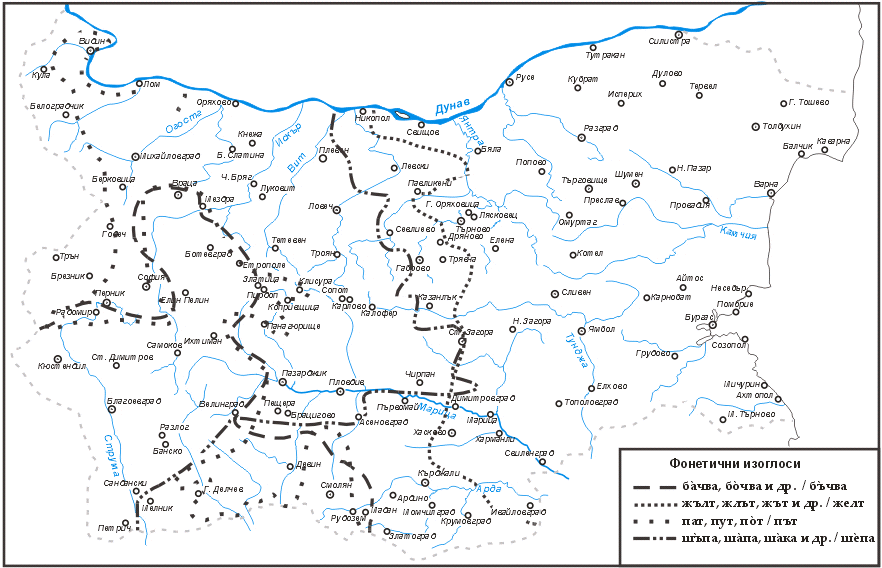
isogloss clockwise (right or down/left or up of the line): 1. vat- bachva, bochva, etc./bąchva; 2.yellow- zhąlt, zhląt, zhąt, etc./zhelt: 3. road- pat, put, pot/pąt; 4.paw- shąpa, shapa, shaka, etc./shepa

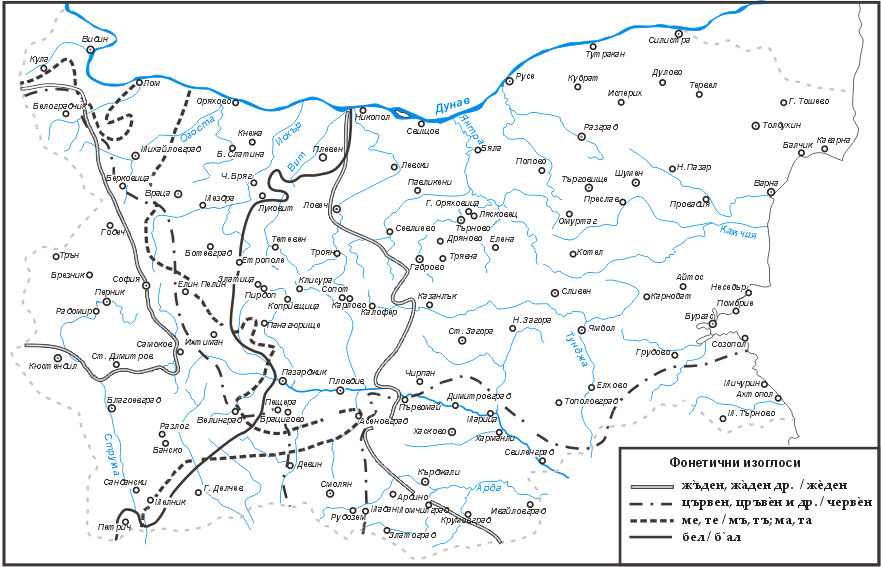
isogloss (clockwise): 1. thirsty- zhąden, zhaden, etc./zheden; 2. red- tsraven, tsąrven/cherven, chirven; 3. me, you- me, te/mą, tą, etc.; 4. white- bel/byal (Yat border)

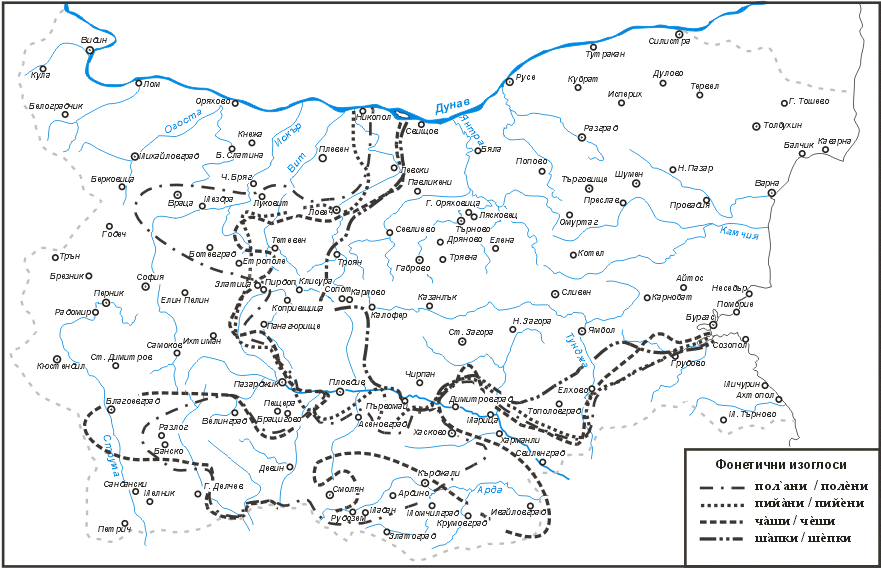
isogloss (clockwise): 1. meadows- polani/poleni; 2. drunk- piyani/piyeni; 3. cups- chashi/cheshi; 4. caps- shapki/shepki

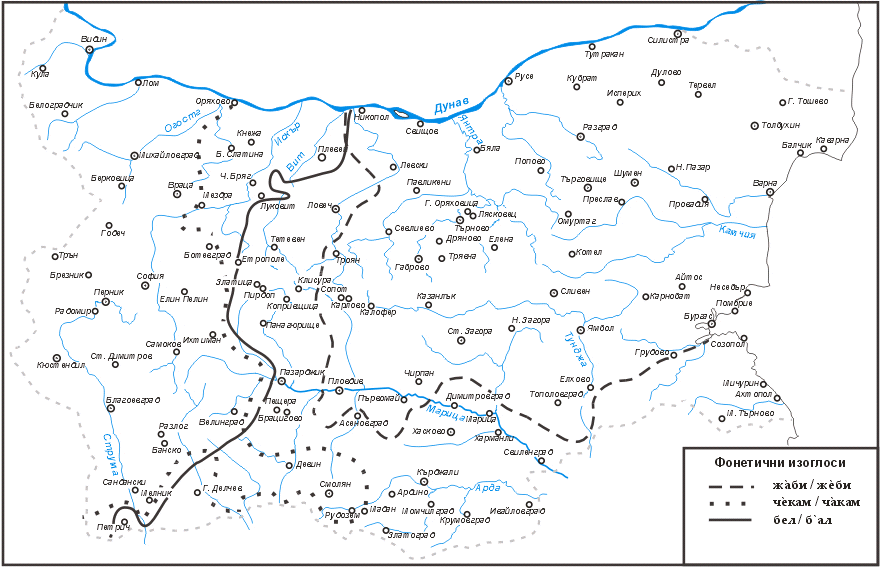
isogloss (clockwise): 1. frogs- zhabi/zhebi; 2. I wait-chekam/chakam, 3.Yat border

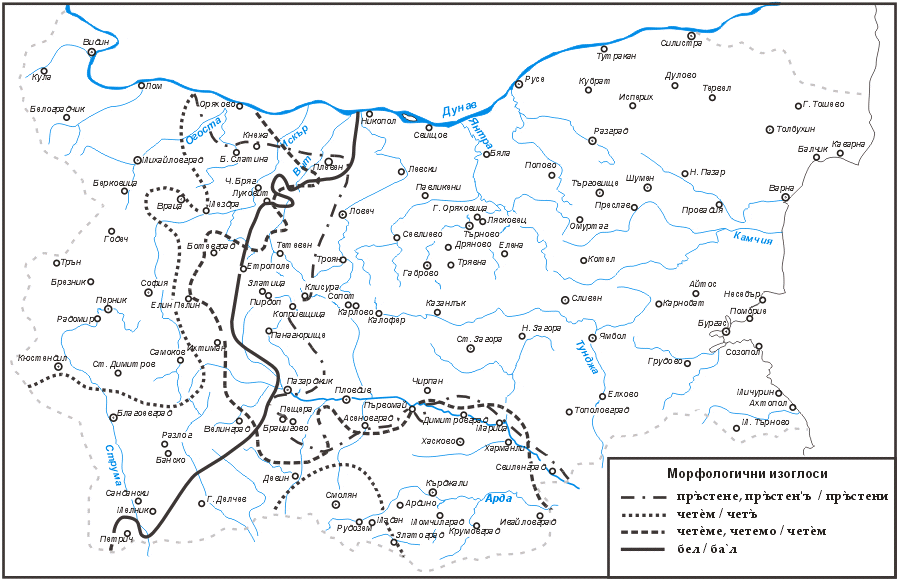
isogloss (clockwise): 1. rings- prąstene, prąsteną/prasteni; 2. I read- chetem/chetą; 3. we read- cheteme, chitami, chetemo, etc./chetem, chitem, etc.; 4. Yat border

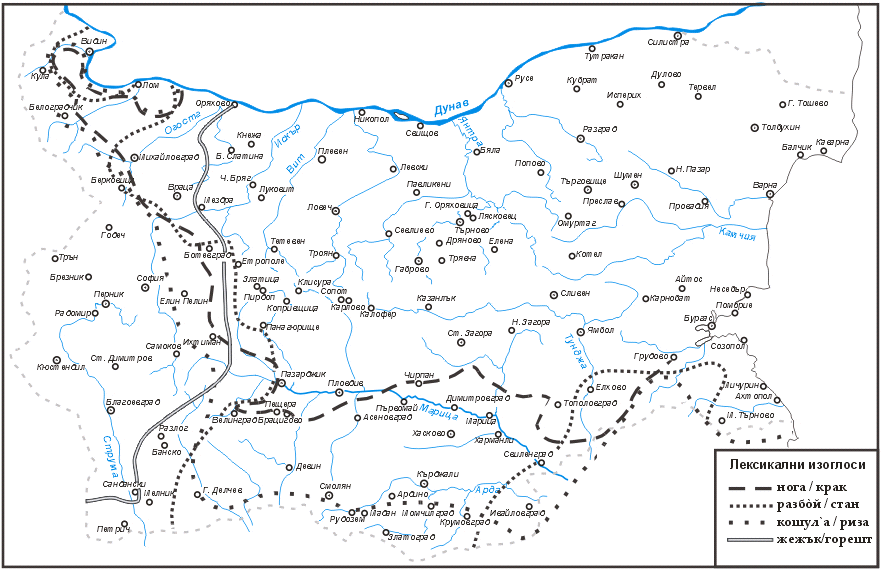
isogloss (clockwise): 1. leg- noga/krak; 2. loom- razboy/stan; 3. shirt- koshula/riza; 4. hot- zhezhko/goreshto

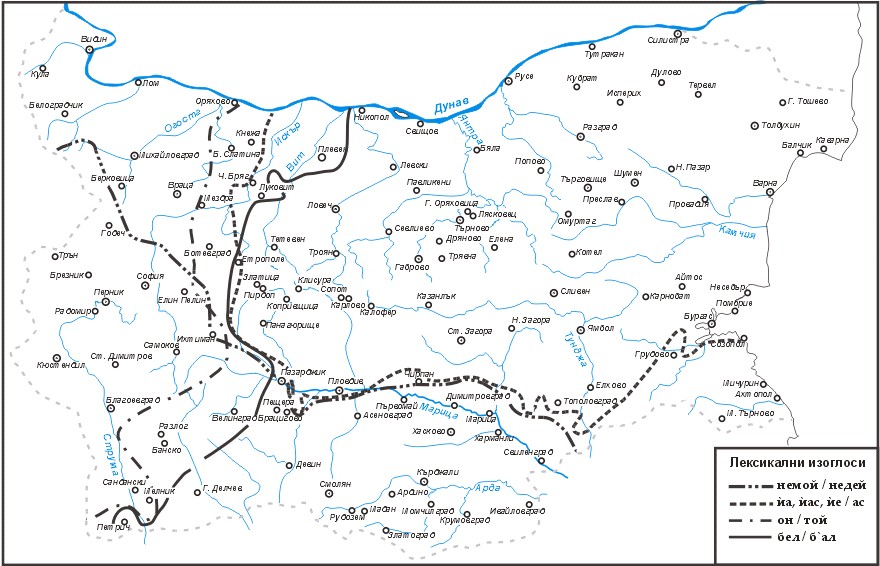
isogloss (clockwise): 1. don't- nemoy/nedey; 2. I- ya, yaz, ye/az; 3.he- on/toy: 4. Yat border

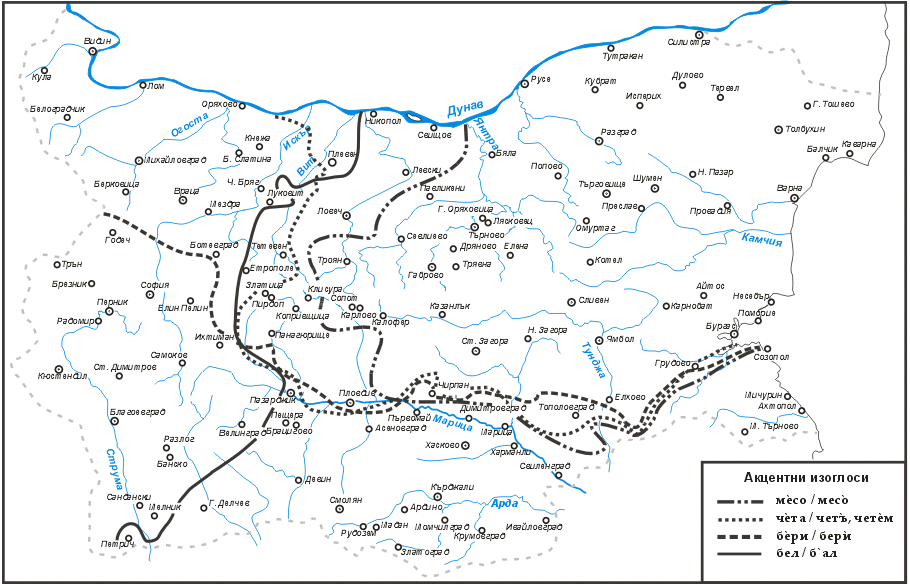
isogloss (clockwise): 1. meat- méso/mesó; 2. I read- chéta, chetem/chetá; 3. pick- béri/berí; 4. Yat border

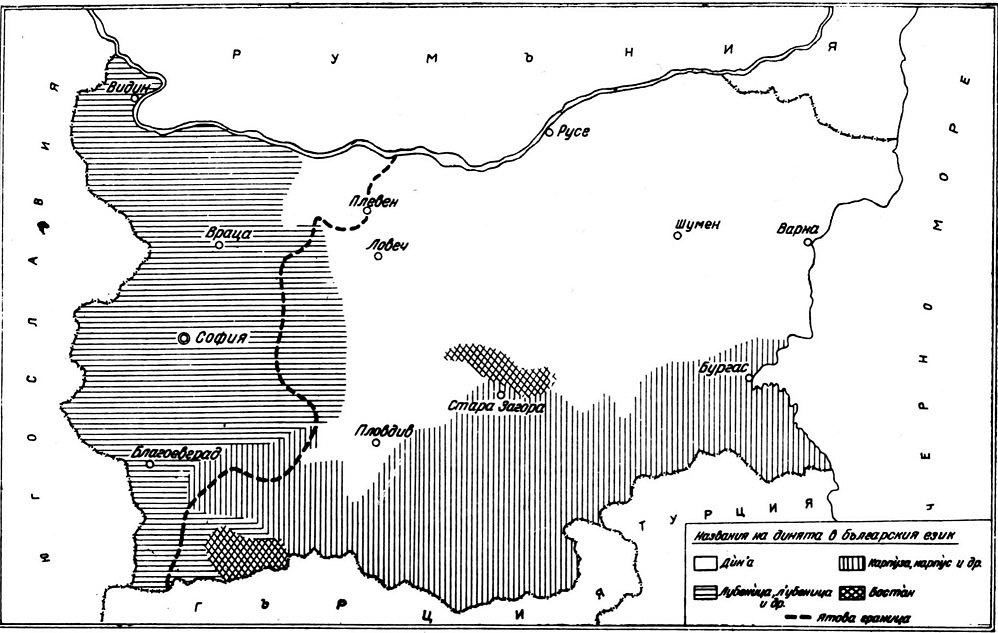
Names of Watermelon- dinya, lubenica, karpuza, boston

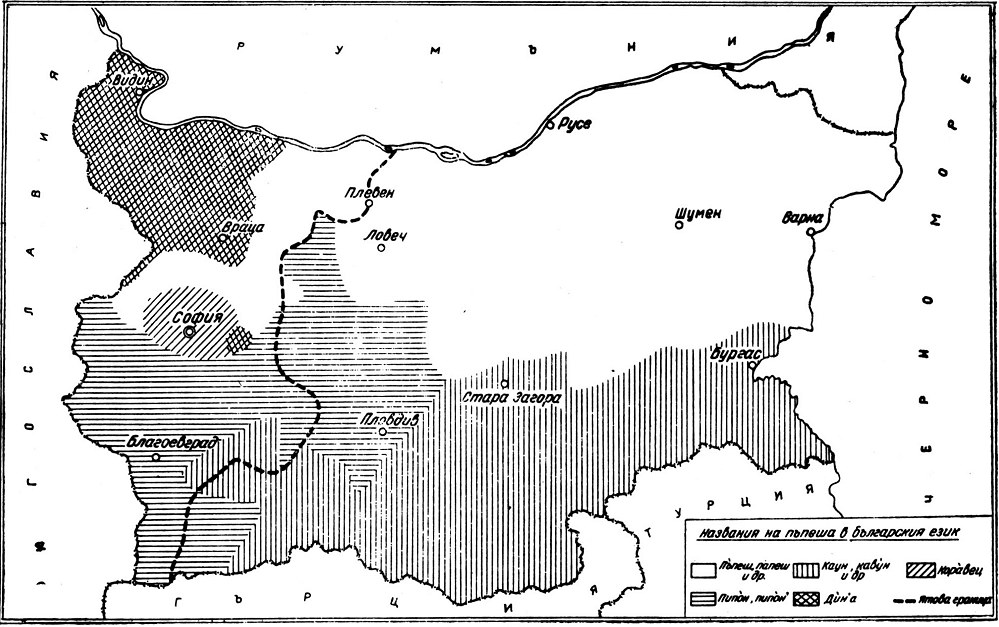
Names of Melon- papesh, pipon, kavun, koravec

Bulgarian dialects are the regional varieties of the Bulgarian language, a South Slavic language. Bulgarian dialectology dates to the 1830s and the pioneering work of Neofit Rilski, Bolgarska gramatika (published 1835 in Kragujevac, Principality of Serbia). Other notable researchers in this field include Marin Drinov, Konstantin Josef Jireček, Lyubomir Miletich, Aleksandar Teodorov-Balan, Stoyko Stoykov.

The dialects of Macedonian are classified as part of Bulgarian in the older literature. Presently, Bulgarian linguistics continue to treat it as such. Since the second half of the 20th century, foreign authors have mostly adopted the convention of treating these in terms of a separate Macedonian language, following the codification of Macedonian as the literary standard language of Yugoslav Macedonia. However, some contemporary linguists still consider Macedonian as a dialect of Bulgarian. Macedonian authors in turn tend to treat all dialects spoken in the geographical region of Macedonia as Macedonian, including those spoken in Bulgarian Macedonia. Together with their closest lexical and grammatical relative they comprise the Eastern South Slavic branch. The present article treats all these dialects together, because of their close structural similarity and the fact that many important dialect boundaries intersect both territories.

The Bulgarian ethnos absorbed diverse Slavic tribes and not a particular language. The main isogloss separating the Bulgarian dialects into Eastern and Western is the yat border, marking the different mutations of the Old Church Slavonic yat form (ѣ, *ě), pronounced as either /ʲa/ or /ɛ/ to the east (byal, but plural beli in Balkan dialects, "white") and strictly as /ɛ/ to the west of it (bel, plural beli) throughout former Yugoslavia. Isoglosses shape three groups. Besides the Eastern and Western dialects, the Rup group of dialects is distinct, which comprises the Rhodopes and everything southwards from Thessaloniki to Istanbul, although it is an Eastern dialect. The official language derives most often from the northeastern group of dialects nominally based on Veliko Tarnovo dialect. Many Western South Slavic lexical, morphological and phonological isoglosses are present in all Western Bulgarian dialects and rarer in Rup dialects, which peak in Torlakian. Bulgarian, Macedonian and Serbian dialects share characteristics far beyond the Torlakian area and beyond the contested territories of the medieval Bulgarian and Serbian states, which are west of Sofia. So, these political entities are not responsible for the transitional features, but they are basically rooted in other type of evolution, likely in a makeup in the contact area of the two sources of Eastern and Western South Slavic tribes. The makeup of the transitional area shows a mix of Eastern and Western South Slavic characteristics found in western Bulgaria, which contact happened in the Balkans assuming the exact location of this area. All isoglosses commonly share gradual borders deep inside the country, but the northeast always do not, which likely means that the contact zone mixed after the settling of the Slavs in the Balkans. In one instance both a and ъ for nasal yus are part of Elin Pelin dialect. Probably one of the words that remain the same on one of the largest areas in Bulgaria is that for night nosht, which is at best rare in other Slavic languages, in which along with the Torlaks in Bulgaria noch means night.

In eastern Bulgarian dialects in contrast with the other South Slavic languages, standard Ukrainian and Czech, the unstressed vowel e by palatalization turns into i or ie. The Bulgarian pronouns in third person toy, te are documented in some Ukrainian dialects.

== Dialectal groups ==
Bulgarian dialects can be divided into the following dialectal groups and individual dialects:

Eastern Bulgarian dialects: Moesian dialects; Shumen dialect; Balkan dialects; Central Balkan dialect; Kotel-Elena-Dryanovo dialect; Panagyurishte dialect; Pirdop dialect; Teteven dialect; Erkech dialect; Subbalkan dialect; Transitional Balkan dialects; Rup dialects; Strandzha dialect; Thracian dialect; Hvoyna dialect; Chepino dialect; Paulician dialect; Zlatograd dialect; Smolyan dialect; Pomak dialect (Greece); Babyak dialect; Razlog dialect; Serres-Nevrokop dialect; Solun dialect	Western Bulgarian dialects: Northwestern Bulgarian dialects; Byala Slatina-Pleven dialect; Vidin-Lom dialect; Southwestern Bulgarian dialects; Botevgrad dialect; Vratsa dialect; Ihtiman dialect; Elin Pelin dialect; Sofia dialect; Samokov dialect; Dupnitsa dialect; Kyustendil dialect; Pirin-Malashevo dialects; Blagoevgrad dialect; Petrich dialect; Pianec-Kamenitsa-Kraishte dialect; Malashevo dialect; Transitional Bulgarian dialects; Tran dialect; Breznik dialect; Belogradchik dialect; Bosilegrad dialect; Tsaribrod dialect	Dialects from North Macedonia (traditionally treated as part of Bulgarian in Bulgarian sources.); Northern dialects; Tetovo dialect; Veles dialect; Prilep-Mariovo dialect; Bitola dialect; Debar dialect; Ohrid-Struga dialect; Prespa dialect; Korca dialect; Dialects from Aegean Macedonia (traditionally treated as part of Bulgarian in Bulgarian sources.); Kostur dialect; Doyran dialect; Lerin dialect; Kukush-Voden dialect; Among the traditional diaspora: Banat Bulgarian dialect; Wallachian Bulgarian dialects; Transylvanian Bulgarian dialects; Bulgarian dialects in the former Soviet Union; Anatolian dialect

== See also ==
- History of the Bulgarian language
- Bulgarian lexis
- Bulgarian grammar
- Torlakian dialect
- Macedonian language
- Slavic dialects of Greece
