= Belogradchik dialect =

Dialect of Bulgarian

The Belogradchik dialect is a Bulgarian dialect, member of the Transitional dialects, which is spoken on the westernmost northern slopes of the Balkan Mountains in northwestern Bulgaria. It borders on the Northwestern Byala Slatina-Pleven and Vidin-Lom dialect and north, the Sofia dialect to the southeast and the Serbian Torlak dialect to the southwest.

== Phonological and morphological characteristics ==
- Vocalic r and l for Old Church Slavonic ръ/рь and лъ/ль instead of the combinations ръ/ър (rə~ər) and лъ/ъл (lə~əl) in Standard Bulgarian (as in the Northwestern dialects): дрво, слза instead of дърво, сълза (tree, tear)
- Definite articles -ът, -та, -то, -те as in Standard Bulgarian
- The pronoun for 3rd person, sing. feminine agglomerative is г҄у, н҄у instead of я and the pronoun for 3rd person plural dative is г҄им, г҄ум instead of им

For other phonological and morphological characteristics typical for all Transitional dialects, cf. Transitional Bulgarian dialects.

== Sources ==
Стойков, Стойко: Българска диалектология, Акад. изд. "Проф. Марин Дринов", 2006
