= Vratsa dialect =

Dialect of Bulgarian

The Vratsa dialect is a Bulgarian dialect, member of the Northwestern Bulgarian dialects, which is spoken in the region of Vratsa in northwestern Bulgaria. The Vratsa dialect borders on the transitional Belogradchik dialect to the west, the Northwestern Byala Slatina-Pleven dialect to the north and east, the Botevgrad dialect to the southeast and the Sofia dialect to the south.

== Phonological and morphological characteristics ==
- Vowel a and у for Old Church Slavonic ѫ (yus), ь and ъ: маж vs. formal Bulgarian мъж (man), сан vs. formal Bulgarian сън (sleep), рука vs formal Bulgarian ръка (arm)
- Plural dative personal pronoun мг҄и vs. formal Bulgarian им (them)": дайте мг҄и (Give them)

For other phonological and morphological characteristics typical for all Southwestern dialects, cf. Northwestern Bulgarian dialects.

== Sources ==
Стойков, Стойко: Българска диалектология, Акад. изд. "Проф. Марин Дринов", 2006
