= Elin Pelin dialect =

Dialect of Bulgarian

The Elin Pelin dialect is a Bulgarian dialect, member of the Southwestern Bulgarian dialects, which is spoken in the eastern part of the Sofia valley in central western Bulgaria. Its immediate neighbours are the Vratsa dialect to the north, the Botevgrad dialect to the east, the Sofia dialect to the west and the Samokov dialect to the south.

== Phonological and morphological characteristics ==
- Vowel a for Old Church Slavonic ѫ (yus), ь and ъ: маж vs. formal Bulgarian мъж (man), сан vs. formal Bulgarian сън (sleep)
- щ/жд (ʃt~ʒd) for Proto-Slavic *tʲ~*dʲ (as in Standard Bulgarian) - леща, между (lentils, between). The future tense particle, however, is ше, к҄е, к҄у
- Vocalic r and l for Old Church Slavonic ръ/рь and лъ/ль instead of the combinations ръ/ър (rə~ər) and лъ/ъл (lə~əl) in Standard Bulgarian - дрво, слза instead of дърво, сълза (tree, tear).
- Verb ending -a instead of formal Bulgarian -ъ in verbs of the first and second conjugation: чет'а vs. formal Bulgarian чет'ъ (I read)

For other phonological and morphological characteristics typical for all Southwestern dialects, cf. Southwestern Bulgarian dialects.

== Sources ==
Стойков, Стойко: Българска диалектология, Акад. изд. "Проф. Марин Дринов", 2006
