= Vidin-Lom dialect =

Dialect of Bulgarian

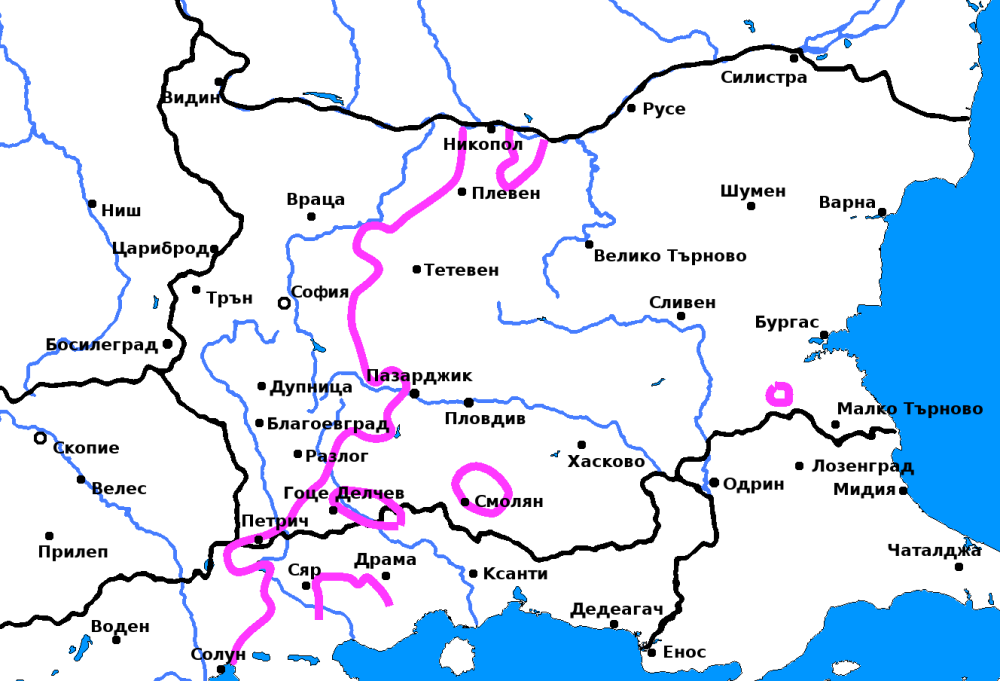
Yat border in the Bulgarian language

The Vidin-Lom dialect is a Bulgarian dialect spoken in the regions of Vidin and Lom and partially in the regions of Berkovitsa and Montana in northwestern Bulgaria. The dialect is part of the Northwestern Bulgarian dialects. The most significant feature of the dialect, as in all Western Bulgarian dialects, is the pronunciation of Old Church Slavonic ѣ (yat) only as ɛ instead of formal and Eastern Bulgarian я/е (ʲa/ɛ) – бел/бели instead of бял/бели.

== Phonological and morphological characteristics ==
- Ending -м for 1st person sing. present time in all verbs - четем, пишем instead of formal Bulgarian чета, пиша (I read, I write)
- Future tense particle че instead of ще - че идем, че направим instead of formal Bulgarian ще ида, ще направя (I will come, I will do). However, with the exception of the future tense particle, all other reflexes of Proto-Slavic *tʲ/*dʲ are usually щ/жд (ʃt/ʒd), as in Standard Bulgarian
- Personal pronoun йа for 1st person sing. and он for 3rd person sing. (instead of аз and той in Standard Bulgarian)

Most other phonological and morphological characteristics of the dialect are the same as the general features typical for all Northwestern Bulgarian dialects (cf. article for details).

== Sources ==
Стойков, Стойко: Българска диалектология, Акад. изд. "Проф. Марин Дринов", 2006
