= Sökmen =

Sökmen is a Turkish surname. Notable persons with that name include:

== Given name ==
- Sökmen (Artuqid) (died 1104), Turkish bey
- Sökmen el-Kutbî (died 1111), Turkish bey
- Sökmen II (died 1185), Turkish ruler

== Surname ==
- Ayhan Sökmen (1929–2013), Turkish physician
- İhsan Sökmen (1873–1955), Turkish soldier and politician
- Tayfur Sökmen (1892–1980), Turkish politician

== Places ==
- Sökmen, Çivril
- Sökmen, Kütahya, a village in the Merkez (Central) district of Kütahya Province, Turkey
