= Pirdop dialect =

Dialect of Bulgarian

The Pirdop dialect is a Bulgarian dialect, which is part of the Northwestern group of the Northwestern Bulgarian dialects. Its range includes the towns of Pirdop, Zlatitsa and Koprivshtitsa, as well as several neighbouring villages. The most significant feature of the dialect, as in all Northwestern Bulgarian , is the pronunciation of Old Church Slavonic ѣ (yat) as ʲa or ɛ, depending on the character of the following syllable. However, the Pirdop dialect also features a number of characteristics which bring it closer to the neighbouring Western Bulgarian dialects, and especially to the Botevgrad dialect and which, in turn, separate it from the rest of the Northwestern dialects.

== Phonological and morphological characteristics ==
- Vowel a and у for Old Church Slavonic ѫ (yus) and ъ (back yer) in a stressed syllable and ъ (ə) in an unstressed syllable: маж~муж vs. formal Bulgarian мъж (man), сан vs. formal Bulgarian сън (sleep), but му'жа~маʼжа vs. formal Bulgarian мъ'жът (the man)
- Verb ending -a instead of formal Bulgarian -ъ in a stressed syllable and a half-reduced -a in an unstressed syllable in verbs of the first and second conjugation: чет'а vs. formal Bulgarian чет'ъ (I read)
- Ръ/Рь (rə~ər) and лъ(lə) for Old Church Slavonic groups ръ/рь and лъ/ль versus formal Bulgarian ръ/ър (rə/ər) and лъ/ъл (lə/əl): дрво, слза instead of formal Bulgarian дърво, сълза (tree, tear).
- Ending e instead of formal Bulgarian i for multi-syllable masculine nouns (българе instead of българи)
- The masculine definite article is -a in a stressed syllable and a half-reduced -a in an unstressed syllable - кра'ка (the leg)

Most of the other phonological and morphological characteristics of the Pirdop dialect are similar to the general features typical for all Northwestern dialects, cf. article.
