= Sofia dialect =

Dialect of Bulgarian

The Sofia dialect is a Bulgarian dialect, member of the Northwestern Bulgarian dialects, which is spoken in western part of the Sofia valley by part of the Shopi. Its immediate neighbours are the Vratsa dialect to the north, the Elin Pelin dialect to the east, the Transitional dialects to the west and the Samokov dialect to the south.

== Phonological and morphological characteristics ==
- Vowel ə for Old Church Slavonic ѫ (yus), ь and ъ, as in Standard Bulgarian: мъж [ˈmɤʒ] (man), сън [ˈsɤn] (sleep).
- Limited number of o [ɔ] reflexes of Old Church Slavonic ъ (back yer): in the suffix -ък [ɤk], the prefixes въз [vɤz] and съ [sɤ] and the prepositions във, въз and със: сос него [sɔs ˈnegɔ] vs. Standard Bulgarian със него [sɤs ˈnego] (with him), напредок [naˈpredɔk] vs. Standard Bulgarian напредък [nɐˈpredɐk] (progress)
- щ/жд (ʃt~ʒd) for Proto-Slavic *tʲ~*dʲ (as in Standard Bulgarian) - леща, между [ˈlɛʃta], [mɛʒˈdu] (lentils, between). The future tense particle, however, is че: че че'теме [t͡ʃɛ ˈt͡ʃɛtɛme] vs. Standard Bulgarian ще четем [ʃtɛ t͡ʃɛˈtɛm] (we will read)
- ръ (rə) and лъ (lə) for Old Church Slavonic groups ръ~рь and лъ~ль versus formal Bulgarian ръ~ър (rə~ər) and лъ~ъл (lə~əl): дръво, слъза [drɤˈvɔ], [slɤˈza] instead of formal Bulgarian дърво, сълза [dɐrˈvɔ], [sɐlˈza] (tree, tear).
- Ending -м [m] in 1st person sg. present tense for verbs of all conjugations: четем [ˈt͡ʃɛtɛm] vs. formal Bulgarian чет'ъ [t͡ʃɛˈtɤ] (I read)
- Lack of ending -т in the forms for 3rd person pl. present tense: яда [ˈjada] vs. formal Bulgarian ядът [jɐˈdɤt] (they eat)
- Personal pronouns for 3rd person он [ɔn], она [ɔˈna], оно [ɔˈnɔ], они [ɔˈni], as in Old Bulgarian (той [tɔj], тя [tʲa], то [tɔ], те [tɛ] in Standard Bulgarian)

For other phonological and morphological characteristics typical for all Southwestern dialects, cf. the Northwestern Bulgarian dialects.

== Sources ==
Стойков, Стойко: Българска диалектология, Акад. изд. "Проф. Марин Дринов", 2006
