= Botevgrad dialect =

Dialect of Bulgarian

The Botevgrad dialect is a Bulgarian dialect, member of the Northwestern Bulgarian dialects, which is spoken in the region of Botevgrad and Etropole in northwestern Bulgaria. It is located on the yat boundary and is closely related to the Pirdop dialect, Vratsa dialect and Torlak dialects

== Phonological and morphological characteristics ==
- Vowel a and у for Old Church Slavonic ѫ (yus), ь and ъ: муж vs. formal Bulgarian мъж (man), сан vs. formal Bulgarian сън (sleep), Рука vs formal Bulgarian ръка (arm). However, Old Church Slavonic ъ has resulted in o in the prepositions and prefixes въз: во̀да vs. formal Bulgarian вода ( water). The schwa is usually pronounced only in Turkish words, e.g. бакър (copper)
- Vocalic r and l for Old Church Slavonic ръ/рь and лъ/ль instead of the combinations ръ/ър (rə~ər) and лъ/ъл (lə~əl) in Standard Bulgarian - дрво, слза instead of дърво, сълза (tree, tear).
- Lack of iotation between two vowels: копаа (also копам) vs. formal Bulgarian копая (to dig)
- The masculine definite article is -a, as in the Pirdop dialect: кра'ка (the leg)
- Verb ending -a instead of formal Bulgarian -ъ in verbs of the first and second conjugation: чет'а vs. formal Bulgarian чет'ъ (I read)
- Future tense particle is че (ще in all cases in Standard Bulgarian)
- Personal pronouns for 3rd person он, она, оно, они (той, тя, то, те in Standard Bulgarian)
- Special sounds that can be hear in the dialect are ć (soft ch) [t͡ɕ] and Đ (Soft dzh) [d͡ʑ]

For other phonological and morphological characteristics typical for all Northwestern dialects, cf. Northwestern Bulgarian dialects.

== Sources ==
Стойков, Стойко: Българска диалектология, Акад. изд. "Проф. Марин Дринов", 2006
