= Byala Slatina-Pleven dialect =

Dialect of Bulgarian

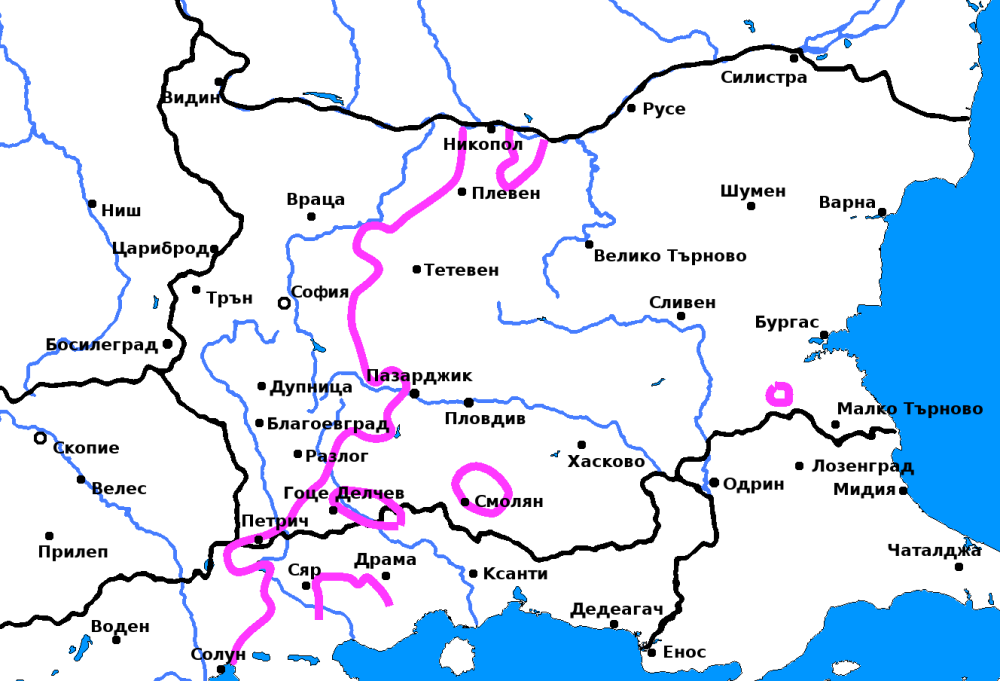
Yat border in the Bulgarian language

The Byala Slatina-Pleven dialect is a Bulgarian dialect spoken in the regions of Pleven, Byala Slatina and Kula in northwestern Bulgaria. The dialect is part of the Northwestern Bulgarian dialects. The most significant feature of the dialect, as in all Western Bulgarian dialects, is the pronunciation of Old Church Slavonic ѣ (yat) only as ɛ instead of formal and Eastern Bulgarian я/е (ʲa~ɛ) – бел/бели instead of бял/бели. Otherwise, the Byala Slatina-Pleven dialect bears strong resemblance to its neighbouring Eastern Bulgarian dialects and with some exceptions, mainly the pronunciation of yat, has the same phonological and morphological features as the neighbouring subdialects of the Eastern Bulgarian Central Balkan dialect.

== Phonological and morphological characteristics ==
- Ending (ə) (in a stressed syllable) and slightly reduced a (in an unstressed syllable) in the verbs of 1st and 2nd conjugation (as in Standard Bulgarian) - мръ, пиша
- Future tense particle ще/ше as in Standard Bulgarian and the Central Balkan dialect - ще/ше ида (I will come)
- Ending schwa (ə) in stressed syllables of female nouns (as in the Central Balkan dialect) - женˈъ, горˈъ (woman, forest)
- Pronunciation of the little yus (ѧ) as (ə) - шъпа, жътва (palm, harvest)
- Participles ньега and гьа for 3rd person singular feminine agglomerative case instead of Standard Bulgarian нея/я

Most other phonological and morphological characteristics of the dialect are the same as the general features typical for all Northwestern Bulgarian dialects (cf. article for details).
