= Northwestern Bulgarian dialects =

Group of dialects of Bulgarian

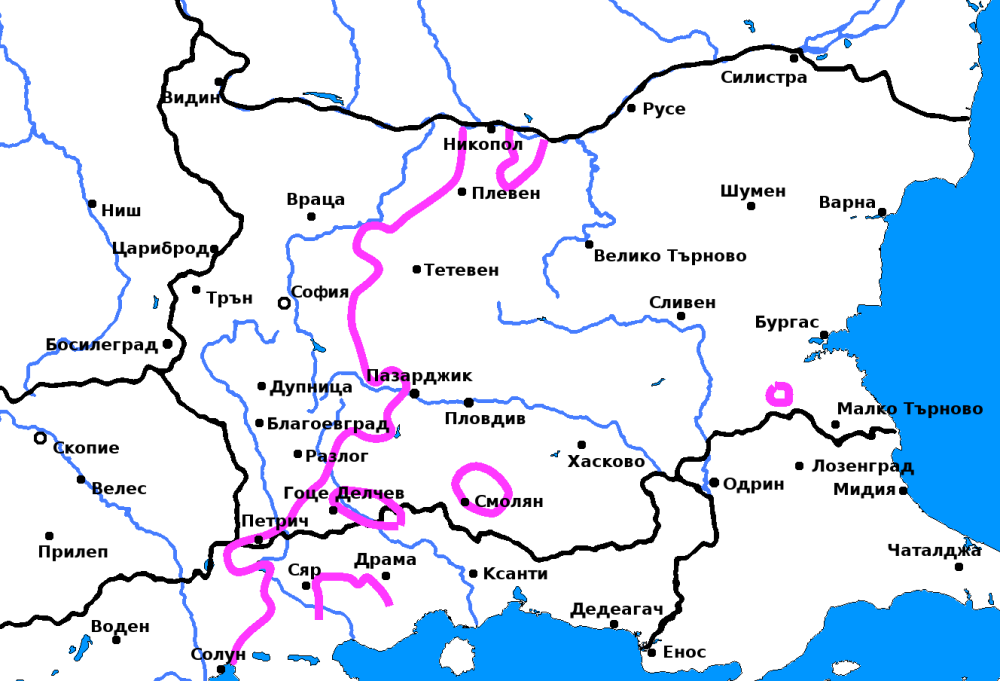
Yat border in the Bulgarian language

The Northwestern Bulgarian dialects are closely related dialects of the Bulgarian language, which are located west of the yat boundary and thus are part of the Western Bulgarian dialects. The range of the dialects includes most of northwestern Bulgaria, to the west of the line between Nikopol, Pleven, Botevgrad, Svoge, Vratsa and Mezdra and to the north of the line between Belogradchik. They bear strong resemblance to their neighbouring Eastern Bulgarian dialects and with some exceptions, mainly the pronunciation of yat, have the same phonological and morphological features as the neighbouring subdialects of the Eastern Bulgarian Central Balkan dialect.

== Phonological and morphological characteristics ==
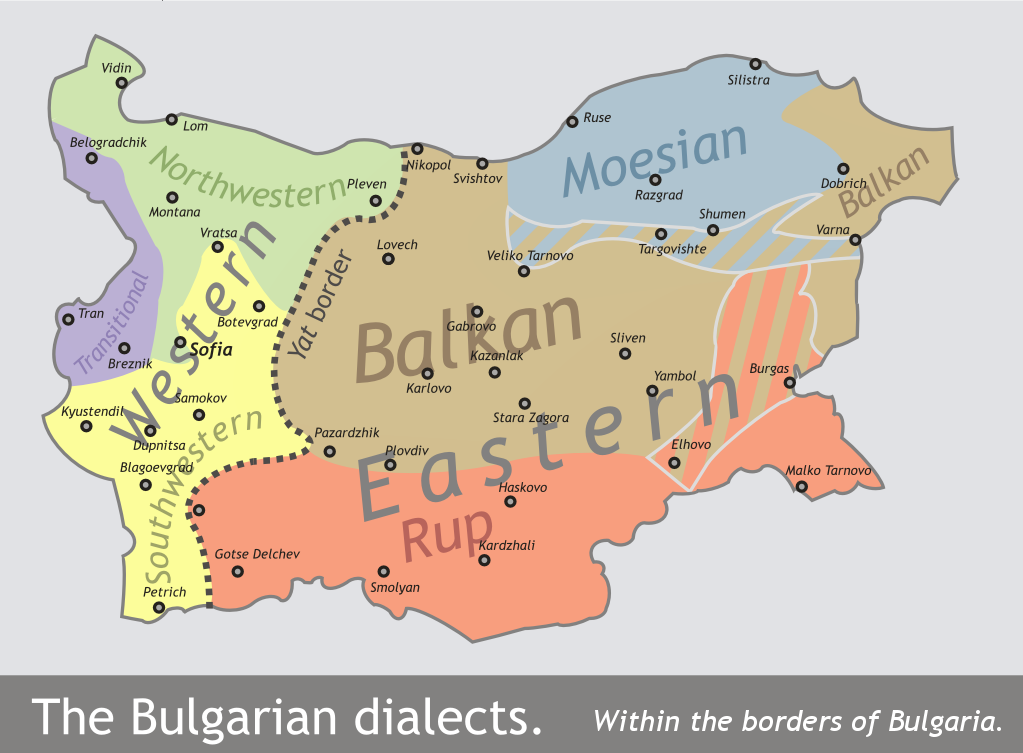
Map of the Bulgarian dialects within Bulgaria

- Old Church Slavonic ѣ (yat) is always pronounced as ɛ instead of formal Bulgarian я/е (ʲa~ɛ) – бел/бели
- Vocalic r and l for Old Church Slavonic ръ/рь and лъ/ль instead of the combinations ръ/ър (rə~ər) and лъ/ъл (lə~əl) in Standard Bulgarian - дрво, слза instead of дърво, сълза (tree, tear). However, there are words where the schwa (ə) is pronounced as in Standard Bulgarian - връх, слънце (summit, sun)
- ending e instead of formal Bulgarian i for plural past active aorist participles (биле instead of били)
- The masculine definite article is (ə) (in a stressed syllable) and slightly reduced a (in an unstressed syllable) - гърбъ́, сто́ла (the back, the chair)

Most other phonological and morphological features of the Northwestern Bulgarian dialects are similar to the characteristics of the Eastern Bulgarian dialects and the formal language: щ~жд (ʃt~ʒd) for Proto-Slavic *tʲ~*dʲ and Old Church Slavonic щ~жд (ʃt~ʒd), ъ (ə) for both Old Church Slavonic ѫ (yus) and ъ (ə), vowel reduction, etc.
