= Northern Front (Soviet Union) =

WW2 Soviet Red Army formation

The Northern Front (Russian: Северный фронт) was a front of the Red Army during the Second World War.

The Northern Front was created on June 24, 1941 from the Leningrad Military District. Its primary goal was the defense of the Kola Peninsula and the northern shores of the Gulf of Finland. On August 23, 1941, the Front's forces were divided into the Karelian Front and the Leningrad Front. Lieutenant General Markian M. Popov commanded the Front for the three months of its existence.

The Front's major force structure was based on the 7th Army, 14th Army, 23rd Armies and the Leningrad People's Opolcheniye Army. Other forces included four Rifle Corps, two Mechanized Corps, seventeen Rifle Divisions, four Tank Divisions, two Motor Rifle Divisions, eight artillery regiments of the Reserve of Highest Command, eight Aviation Divisions (including one objective air division), seven Fortified Regions, one Fortified Position, and thirteen machinegun battalions.

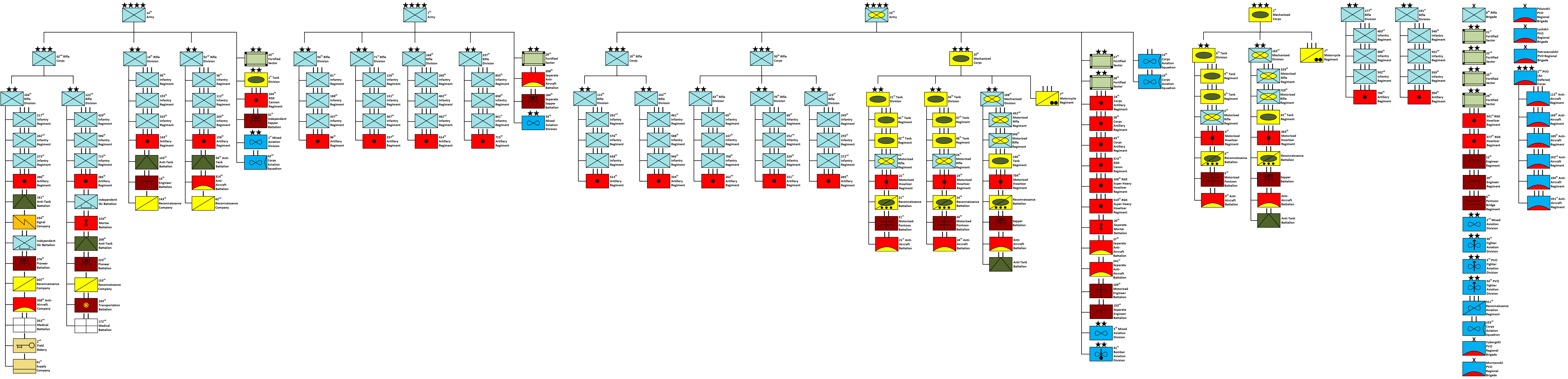
Northern Front Organization as of 22 June 1941

The formations of the Northern Front included the following subunits:

== 14th Army ==
- 14th Army (HQ in Murmansk) with its commander, General Lieutenant Valerian Frolov, responsible for the Defence Sector No.1 which extended from the coast of the Barents Sea to include the entire Kola Peninsula and in particular the Murmansk to Kandalaksha railway.

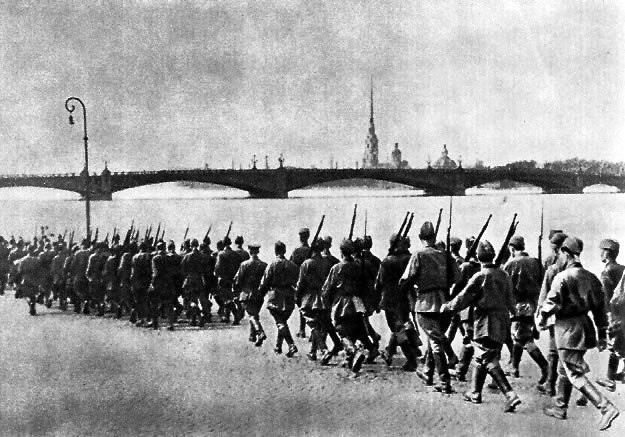
Mobilisation of troops of the Leningrad Military District in the summer of 1941

14th Rifle Division defending the Petsamo sector
42nd Rifle Corps

104th Rifle Division
122nd Rifle Division

52nd Rifle Division
1st Tank Division
104 Gun Artillery Regiment of the Reserve of Highest Command
23rd Murmansk Fortified Region (Russian: Мурманский укрепленный район)
35th, 100th, 82nd, 72nd and 101st Border Guard Detachments
1st Mixed Air Division

- Northern Fleet commanded by Admiral Arseniy Golovko (based at Polyarny) and its coast defence and naval aviation units.

== 7th Army ==
- Separate 7th Army (HQ in Suoyarvi) with its commander Lieutenant General Filip D. Gorelenko responsible for the Defence Sector No.2 covering the longest sector of the Front between the Kola Peninsula and Lake Ladoga, and in particular having the responsibility at once for the gap between the Ladoga and Onega lakes, and the possible land assault to cut off Arkhangelsk. In fact the Stavka had determined the Army had four sectors in its responsibility.

54th Rifle Division
71st Rifle Division
168th Rifle Division
237th Rifle Division
541 Howitzer Artillery Regiment of the Reserve of Highest Command
26th Sortavala Fortified Region
1st, 73rd, 80th and 3rd Border Guard Detachments
55th Mixed Air Division (Petrozadovsk)

153rd Fighter Aviation Regiment
72nd Bomber Aviation Regiment

== 23rd Army ==
- 23rd Army (HQ in (Kuusa or Kusa (village)) with its commander General Lieutenant P.S. Pshennikov responsible for the Defence Sector No.3 that included immediate approaches to Leningrad, including two major population centres of particular interest to Finland, Sortavala and Vyborg. Given the importance of the defended objectives, and previous experience in the Winter War, the Army was allocated two Rifle Corps, one Mechanised Corps, four rifle divisions, two tank and one Motor Rifle Divisions, three howitzer and one gun Regiment of the Reserve of Highest Command, two Fortified Regions, three border guard detachments, and one aviation division

19th Rifle Corps

142nd Rifle Division
115th Rifle Division

50th Rifle Corps

43rd Rifle Division
123rd Rifle Division

10th Mechanised Corps (removed from the Army in early July)

21st Tank Division
24th Tank Division
198th Motor Rifle Division

101, 108, 519 Howitzer Artillery Regiments of the Reserve of Highest Command
573 Gun Artillery Regiment of the Reserve of Highest Command
102nd, 5th, 33rd Border Guard Detachments
27th Vyborg Fortified Region (Russian: Выборгский укр.район)
28th Keksgolm Fortified Region (Russian: Кексгольмский укр.район)
5th Mixed Air Division which was particularly tasked with preventing repulsing either amphibious or airborne landings in and around the Gulf of Finland coast.

== Leningrad People's Opolcheniye Army ==
- 1st (Kirov) Division of People's Opolcheniye (Russian: 1-я (Кировская) дивизия народного ополчения)) named for the Kirovsky District (Кировский район) (commander Kombrig V.A. Malinnikov)
  - 76th Latvian Separate Rifle regiment on the 14 September.
- 2nd (Moscow) Division of People's Opolcheniye named for the Moskovsky District (Московский район) (Russian: 2-я (Московская) дивизия народного ополчения) (commander to July, Colonel N.S. Ugrumov)
  - battalion of the Military-Political Border Guard School named for Voroshilov (Russian: Военно-политического пограничного училища имени Ворошилова)
  - 519th Corps (Howitzer) Artillery Regiment of Reserve of Highest Command
  - Tank battalion of the Armoured Course for Enhancement of Command Staff (Russian: танковый батальон бронетанковых курсов усовершенствования командного состава)
- 3rd (Frunze) Division of People's Opolcheniye named for the Frunzensky District (Фрунзенский район) (Russian: 3-я (Фрунзенская) дивизия народного ополчения) (commander (Colonel А.P. Netreba, from 16 August Z.N. Alekseyev)
- 1st Guards Division of People's Opolcheniye (Russian: 1-я гвардейская дивизия народного ополчения) (18 July 1941) (commander Colonel I.M. Frolov) (deployed next to the 237th Rifle Division) formed in the Kuybishev District
- 2nd Guards Division of People's Opolcheniye (Russian: 2-я гвардейская дивизия народного ополчения) (18 July 1941) (commander Colonel Sholev, later Colonel V.A. Trubachev) formed in the Sverdlovsk District
  - tank battalion of the Leningrad garrison
- 4th (Dzerzhinsky) Light Division of People's Opolcheniye (Russian: 4-я (Дзержинская) дивизия народного ополчения) (19 July 1941) named for the Dzerzhinsky District (Дзержинский район) (commander Colonel P.I Radigin)
  - Separate battalion of Special Purpose (Russian: Отдельный батальон особого назначения) (commander Almazov)
- 3rd Guards Division of People's Opolcheniye (Russian: 3-я гвардейская дивизия народного ополчения) (24 July 1941) (commander Colonel V.P. Kotelnikov) formed in the Petrograd District
- 4th Guards Division of People's Opolcheniye (Russian: 4-я гвардейская дивизия народного ополчения) (27 July 1941) formed in the Kalinin District (cadre)
- 264th, 265th and 266th separate machinegun-artillery battalions (Russian: отдельный пулеметно-артиллерийский батальон) (264th – 277th and 282nd, 283rd and 289th battalions were created)
- 274th separate machinegun-artillery battalion was allocated to the 177th Rifle Division
- Four Izhorsk “Admiralty” battalions (later 72nd, 73rd, 74th, 75th Combat Red Banner separate machinegun-artillery battalion of the 55th Army)
- Several Destroyer regiments of special purpose were also formed that were eventually integrated into the regular units and partisan detachments.
- Deployed in Gatchina was the 60th destroyer battalion (Russian: истребительный батальон)
- 104th (Terioksky) destroyer battalion (104-й (Териокский) истребительный батальон) deployed in the area of Terioki (now Zelenogorsk)
- Deployed around Kolpino was the 120th destroyer battalion (120-й истребительный батальон) (commander A.I. Osovsky)
- 2nd Latvian workers regiment (commander) (Russian: 2-й Латышский рабочий полк)
- 5th (Kuybishevskaya) Division of People's Opolcheniye (Russian: 5-я дивизия народного ополчения) (1 September 1941) (commander Colonel F.P. Utkin) formed early September 1941 from the former 4th People's Opolcheniye division and on the 10 September dislocated to Pulkovo.
  - 291st separate machinegun-artillery battalion (commander Captain Kaverznev)
- 6th Division of People's Opolcheniye (Russian: 4-я () дивизия народного ополчения) (1 September 1941)
- 7th Division of People's Opolcheniye (Russian: 7-я дивизия народного ополчения) (commander Colonel I.S. Kuznetsov) raised on the 17 September it was formed on the 30 September as the 56th Rifle Division.
- 277th separate machinegun-artillery battalion around Ropsha
- 83rd separate machinegun-artillery battalion (commander Lieutenant E.G. Grigoryev) around Ropsha and Kolpino

== 65th Rifle Corps ==
- 65th Rifle Corps (less its Corps artillery regiments) was a separate Corps which covered the No.4 Defence Sector of the Front which covered the southern coast of the Gulf of Finland with its HQ in Nimma 9 km south of Tallinn and included two divisions

11th Rifle Division
16th Rifle Division (1st formation; 22 June 1941 - 27 December 1941)

4th Air Division (from the Leningrad Military District)

== Hanko Peninsula naval base ==
- The Hanko Peninsula naval base (commander General S.I. Kobanov) on the Hanko Peninsula was responsible for the No.5 Defence Sector and included

29th Hanko Peninsula naval base Fortified Region (Russian: Укреплённый район военно-морской базы Ханко) (General Major Shore Duty Aleksei Borisovish Yeliseyev)

8th Separate Rifle Brigade (Colonel Nikolai Pavlovich Simonyak)

Hanko Peninsula Border Guard detachment
13th Fighter Aviation Regiment Separate Reconnaissance Air Squadron
Submarine Divizion
Torpedo Boat Brigade

== 8th Army ==
- 8th Army (from North Western Front after 19 August 1941)

== 48th Army ==
- 48th Army (from North Western Front after 19 August 1941)

== Military aviation of the Leningrad Military District ==
7th PVO Fighter Aviation Corps (later the 2nd PVO Guards Fighter Aviation Corps) commanded by Colonel Stepan Pavlovich Danilov was responsible for air cover over Leningrad, using basing on 10 primary and 15 reserve air fields, and included

- 3rd Air Division equipped with I-16 fighters
- 54th Air Division equipped with Yak-1 fighters
  - 191st, 192nd, 193rd, 194th and 195th Fighter Regiments (IAPs)

== Leningrad Military District forces ==
- The Leningrad Military District also included forces directly subordinated to its commander (Popov).

1st Mechanised Corps less 1st Tank Division which was concentrated around Sluttsk and Pushkino
70th Rifle Division in the Karelian Isthmus half way between Leningrad and Vyborg (Muola).
191st and 177th Rifle Divisions that remained at cadre strength awaiting mobilisation.
4th, 41st and 39th Air Divisions

- The Baltic Fleet (from 28 June 1941)

Vessels of the Baltic Fleet were severely restricted by the geography and lack of air superiority in conducting offensive operations, however their ships batteries included guns in the 305mm, 180mm and 130mm calibres, and the Scientific-research naval artillery range also located in Leningrad possessed 406mm pieces that were being developed for future Soviet battleship designs, and these were without opposition until Germans were able to move the heavy railway guns to the area.

== NKVD troops ==
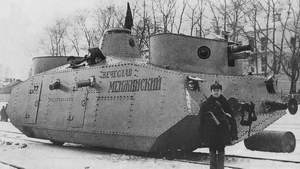
Soviet light armoured drezine (armoured car on rails) MBV D-1 as used by the NKVD security detachments

- The 2nd Division of the NKVD troops (Russian: 2-я дивизия войск НКВД) was responsible for security of specific high-value objectives throughout the Leningrad Military District territory, particularly the railways, and its 11,200 troops were equipped with armoured trains and motorised armoured rail-cars.

== Sources ==
- Glantz, Stumbling Colossus, 1998, Appendix A
