= Bulgarian phonology =

Sound systems of the Bulgarian language

This article discusses the phonological system of the Bulgarian language.

The phonemic inventory of Contemporary Standard Bulgarian (CSB) has been a contested and controversial matter for decades, with two major currents, or schools of thought, forming at national and international level:

One school of thought assumes palatalization as a phonemic distinction in Contemporary Standard Bulgarian and consequently states that it has 17 palatalized phonemes, rounding its phonemic inventory to 45 phonemes. This view, originally suggested in a sketch made by Russian linguist Nikolai Trubetzkoy in his 1939 book Principles of Phonology, was subsequently elaborated by Bulgarian linguists Stoyko Stoykov and Lyubomir Andreychin. It is the traditional and prevalent view in Bulgaria and is endorsed by the Bulgarian Academy of Sciences; some international linguists also favour it.

The other view considers that there are only 28 phonemes in Contemporary Standard Bulgarian: 21 consonants, 1 semivowel and 6 vowels and that only one of them, the semivowel /j/, is palatal. This view is held by a minority of Bulgarian linguists and a substantial number of international ones.

== Vowels ==
Standard Bulgarian vowels (stressed, except for [o], which is an unstressed allophone of /ɔ/, and [ɐ], which is an unstressed allophone of /a/).

Stressed vowels in Bulgarian
	Front	Central	Back
Close	и /i/		у /u/
Mid	е /ɛ/	ъ /ɤ/^{1}	о /ɔ/
Open		а /a/	

^1 /ɤ/ is actually a mid-back and somewhat centralized vowel, usually pronounced midway between [ɤ̞] and [ə]. Thus, it is sometimes transcribed as ⟨ə⟩, or even ⟨ɜ⟩, but its usual notation is ⟨ɤ⟩.

According to their place of articulation, Bulgarian vowels can be grouped in three pairs—front vowels: ⟨е⟩ (/ɛ/) and ⟨и⟩ (/i/); central vowels: ⟨а⟩ (/a/) and ⟨ъ⟩ (/ɤ/); and back vowels: ⟨о⟩ (/ɔ/) and ⟨у⟩ (/u/).

Here /ɛ/, /a/ and /ɔ/ are "low", and /i/, /ɤ/ and /u/ are "high".

The dominant theory of Bulgarian vowel reduction posits that Bulgarian vowels have a phonemic value only in stressed position, while when unstressed, they neutralize in an intermediate centralized position, where lower vowels are raised and higher vowels are lowered. This concerns only the central vowels /a/ and /ɤ/, which neutralize into [ɐ], and the back vowels /ɔ/ and /u/, which neutralize into [o].

The merger of /ɛ/ and /i/ in a similar manner (roughly approaching the lines of [e]) is not allowed in formal speech and is regarded as a provincial (East Bulgarian) dialectal feature; instead, unstressed /ɛ/ is both raised and centralized, approaching the schwa ([ə]).

The theory further posits that such neutralization may nevertheless not always happen: vowels may be distinguished in emphatic or deliberately distinct pronunciation, while reduction is strongest in colloquial speech.

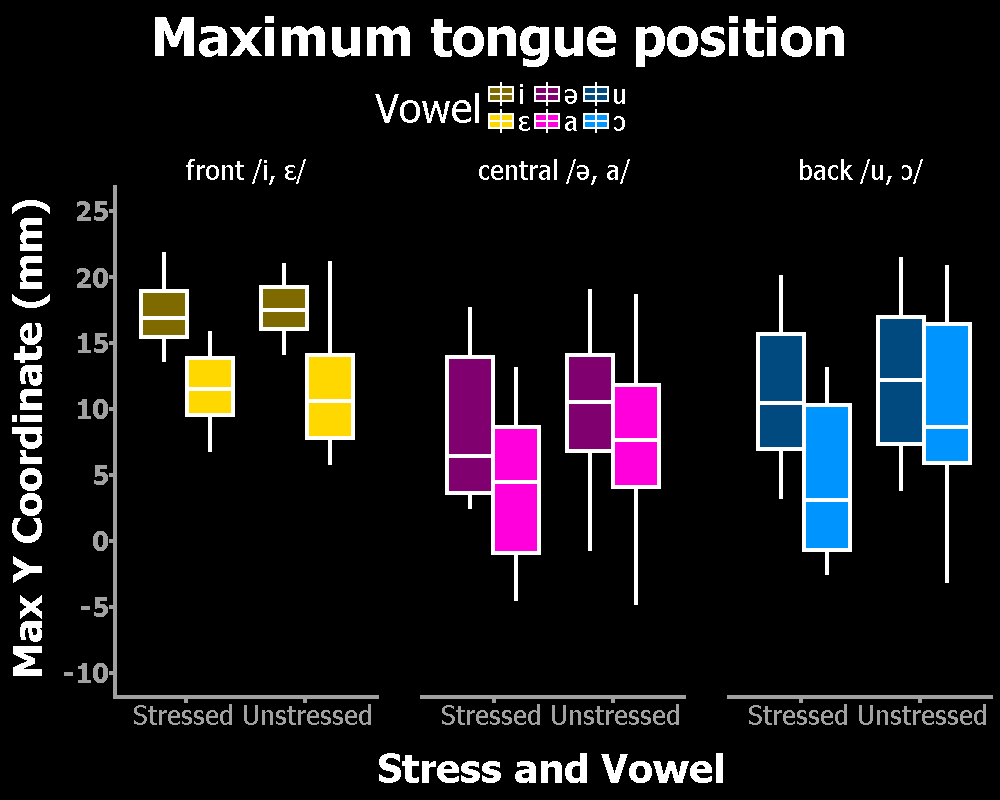
Maximum tongue positions when pronouncing stressed and unstressed Bulgarian vowels

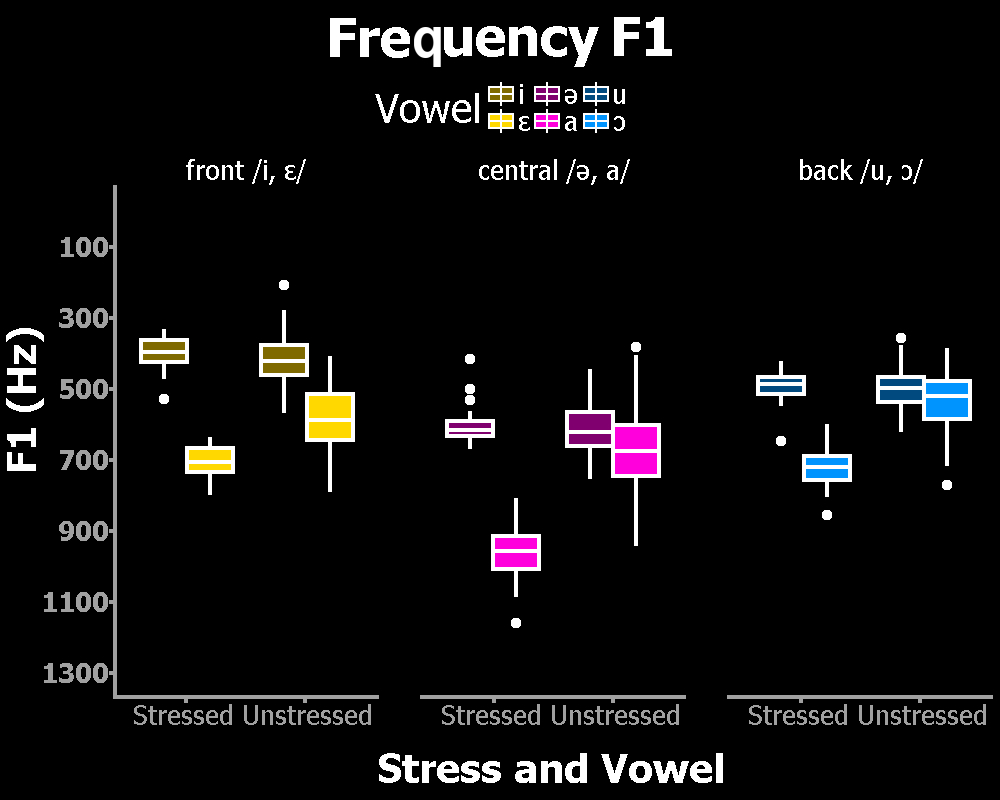
Frequency (F1) distinctions between Bulgarian vowels in stressed and unstressed position

Nevertheless, the hypothesis that high and low vowels neutralize into common vowels of intermediate height has never been properly studied or proven in a practical setting. Several recent studies by both Bulgarian and foreign researchers, involving volunteers speaking Contemporary Standard Bulgarian, have established—on the contrary—that while unstressed low vowels /ɛ/, /a/ and /ɔ/ are indeed raised as expected, unstressed high /ɤ/ and /u/ are also raised somewhat, rather than lowered, while /i/ remains in the same position.

All three studies indicate that a clear distinction is kept between unstressed /ɛ/ and both stressed and unstressed /i/. The situation with unstressed /a/ and /ɔ/ is more complex, but all studies indicate that they both approach unstressed /ɤ/ and /u/ very closely and overlap with them to a great extent, but their average realisations remain slightly more open. One of the studies finds unstressed /a/ to be practically undistinguishable from stressed /ɤ/, while another finds a lack of statistically significant difference between /ɔ/ and /u/, and a third one finds coalescence only in formants for one of the pairs and only in tongue position for the other.

While the difference between all stressed vowels and between unstressed /i/ and /ɛ/ can be heard in almost all cases, the unstressed central and back vowels are perceptually neutralised in minimal pairs, with only 62% identifying unstressed /u/, 59% unstressed /a/ and /ɔ/ and a mere 57% unstressed /ɤ/.

== Semivowels ==
The Bulgarian language officially has only one semivowel: /j/. It is traditionally regarded as a semivowel, but in recent years, it has largely been treated as a "glide" or approximant, thus making it part of the consonant system. Orthographically, it is represented by the Cyrillic letter ⟨й⟩ (⟨и⟩ with a breve) as in най- [naj] (prefix 'most') and (тролей [troˈlɛj] ('trolleybus'), except when it precedes /a/ or /u/ (and their reduced counterparts [ɐ] and [o]), in which case both phonemes are represented by a single letter, ⟨я⟩ or ⟨ю⟩, respectively: e.g., ютия [juˈtijɐ] ('flat iron'), but Йордан [jorˈdan] ('Jordan').

As a result of lenition of velarized /l/ ([ɫ]), ongoing since the 1970s, [w] appears to be an emerging allophone of velarized [ɫ] among younger speakers, especially in preconsonantal position: вълк [vɤwk] ('wolf') instead of [vɤɫk]. While certain Western Bulgarian dialects (in particular, those around Pernik), have had a long-standing tradition of pronouncing [ɫ] as [w], the use of the glide in the literary language was first noted by a radio operator in 1974. A Ukrainian researcher found in 2012 that Bulgarians split into three age-specific groups in terms of [ɫ] pronunciation: 1) people in their 40s or older who have standard pronunciation; 2) people in their 30s, who can articulate [ɫ] but unconsciously say [w]; and 3) younger people who are unable to differentiate between the two sounds and generally say [w].

A study of 30 graduate students was therefore conducted in 2014 to quantify the trend. The study testified to an extremely wide proliferation of the phenomenon, with 9 out of 30 participants unable to produce [ɫ] in any given word, and only 2 participants able to produce [ɫ] correctly, but in no more than half the words in the study. Remarkably, not a single participant was able to enunciate [ɫ] between a bilabial consonant and a rounded vowel, e.g., in аплодирани [ɐpwoˈdirɐni] ('applauded'), or between a rounded vowel and a velar consonant, e.g. in толкова [ˈtɔwkovɐ] ('so'). Another discovery of the study was that in particular positions, certain participants enunciated neither [ɫ] nor [w], but the high back unrounded vowel [ɯ] (or its corresponding glide [ɰ]).

The glide [w] can also be found in English loan words such as уиски [ˈwiski] ('whiskey') or Уикипедия [ˈwikiˈpɛdiɐ] ('Wikipedia'). The semivowel /j/ forms a number of diphthongs, which are summarized below:

Falling /j/ diphthongs
Word initially
[aj]	ай	айрян	'buttermilk'
-
-
-
-
[uj]	уй	уйдисвам	'indulge', 'be suitable for'
Word medially
[aj]	ай	кайма	'minced meat'
-
[ɛj]	ей	вейка	'twig'
[ij]	ий	партийна	'of a party'
[ɔj]	ой	война	'war'
[uj]	уй	вуйчо	'uncle'
Word finally
[aj]	ай	случай	'case'
[ɤj]	ъй	тъй	'thus, so'
[ɛj]	ей	гвоздей	'nail'
[ij]	ий	калий	'potassium'
[ɔj]	ой	завой	'road bend'
[uj]	уй	туй	'this'

Rising /j/ diphthongs
Word initially
[ja]	я	ям	'I eat'
-
[jɛ]	йе	йерархия	'hierarchy'
-
[jɔ]	йо	йод	'iodine'
[ju]	ю	юг	'south'
Word medially
[ja]	я	приятел	'friend'
-
[jɛ]	йе	фойерверк	'fireworks'
-
[jɔ]	йо	район	'area'
[ju]	ю	съюз	'union'
Word finally
[ja]	я	статуя	'statue'
[jɤ]	я	пия	'I drink'
-
-
[jɔ]	йо	Марийо	'You, Maria!' (vocative case)
-

== Consonants ==
According to current scholarly consensus, Bulgarian has a total of 35 consonant phonemes (see table below). Three additional phonemes can also be found ([xʲ], [d͡z], and [d͡zʲ]), but only in foreign proper names such as Хюстън /xʲustɤn/ ('Houston'), Дзержински /d͡zɛrʒinski/ ('Dzerzhinsky'), and Ядзя /jad͡zʲa/, ('Jadzia'). They are, however, normally not considered part of the phonetic inventory of the Bulgarian language. The Bulgarian obstruent consonants are divided into 12 pairs of voiced and voiceless consonants. The only obstruent without a counterpart is the voiceless velar fricative /x/. The voicing contrast is neutralized in word-final position, where all obstruents are voiceless, at least with regard to the official orthoepy of the contemporary Bulgarian spoken language (word-final devoicing is a common feature in Slavic languages); this neutralization is, however, not reflected in spelling.

	Labial		Dental/ Alveolar^{1}		Postalveolar		Palatal	Velar	
	hard	soft	hard	soft	hard	soft	soft	hard	soft
Nasal	m	mʲ	n				ɲ		
Stop	p b	pʲ bʲ	t d	tʲ dʲ			c ɟ	k ɡ	
Affricate			t͡s (d͡z)	t͡sʲ (d͡zʲ)	t͡ʃ d͡ʒ				
Fricative	f v	fʲ vʲ	s z	sʲ zʲ	ʃ ʒ			x^{2}	(xʲ)
Trill			r			rʲ			
Approximant	(w)^{3}						j		
Lateral			ɫ (l)^{4}				ʎ		

An alternative analysis, however, treats palatal consonants merely as palatalized allophones of their respective "hard" counterparts, which are realised as sequences of consonant + /j/ (for example, някой /nʲakoj/ is analysed as /njakoj/). This effectively reduces the consonant inventory to 22 phonemes. No ambiguity arises from such a reanalysis since palatalized consonants only occur before vowels and never before other consonants or in the syllable coda as they do in some other languages with palatal consonants (for example, in fellow Slavic language Russian).

This was the prevailing opinion among Bulgarian linguists prior to 1945, shared, among other things, by Stefan Mladenov, Lyubomir Andreychin, Aleksandar Teodorov-Balan, etc. According to French linguist Léon Beaulieux, Bulgarian is characterised by the tendency to eliminate all palatal consonants. Czech linguist Horalek claimed as early as 1950 that palatalisation in standard Bulgarian has practically disappeared through the decomposition and development of a specific /j/ glide and that words such as бял (white) and дядо (grandfather) are not pronounced as /bʲa̟ɫ/ and /ˈdʲa̟do/, but rather as [bja̟ɫ] and [ˈdja̟do].

Among modern Bulgarian phoneticians, this view is held by Blagoy Shklifov and by Dimitrina Tsoneva, who argues that palatal consonants, though present in a number of dialects and in earlier stages of the development of the Bulgarian language, have been eliminated from the modern literary language.

A phonological table based on this reanalysis is shown below:

	Labial	Dental/ Alveolar	Postalveolar	Dorsal
Nasal	m	n		
Stop	p b	t d		k ɡ
Affricate		t͡s (d͡z)	t͡ʃ d͡ʒ	
Fricative	f v	s z	ʃ ʒ	x^{2}
Approximant	(w)^{3}			j
Trill		r		
Lateral		ɫ (l)^{4}		

^1 According to Klagstad Jr. (1958:46–48), /t tʲ d dʲ s sʲ z zʲ n/ are dental. He also analyzes /ɲ/ as palatalized dental nasal, and provides no information about the place of articulation of /t͡s t͡sʲ r rʲ l ɫ/.

^2 /x/ is voiced [ɣ] with "slight friction" at word boundaries before voiced obstruents. Example: видях го [viˈdʲaɣɡo] ('I saw him').

^3 Not a native phoneme, but appears in borrowings from English, where it is often vocalised as /u/ or pronounced as a fricative /v/ in older borrowings which have come through German or Russian. It is always written as the Cyrillic letter ⟨у⟩ /u/ in Bulgarian orthography. Allophone of /ɫ/ among some younger speakers, possible ongoing sound change (see section below).

^4 /l/ as a phoneme in Bulgarian has three allophones in complementary distribution; "clear" [l], occurring before front vowels, "dark" or velarized [ɫ] occurring before central and back vowels, in between vowels and before consonants, and palatalized [ʎ], occurring before /j/ and a central or back vowel.

=== Hard and palatalized consonants ===
Some linguists believe that, similar to a number of Eastern Slavic languages, most consonant phonemes come in "hard" and "soft" pairs. The latter tend to feature palatalization, or the raising of the tongue toward the hard palate. Thus, for example, /b/ contrasts with /bʲ/ by the latter being palatalized. The consonants /ʒ/, /ʃ/, /t͡ʃ/, and /d͡ʒ/ are considered hard and do not have palatalized variants, though they may have palatalization in some speakers' pronunciation.

The distinction between hard and soft consonants is clear in Bulgarian orthography, where hard consonants are considered normal and precede either ⟨а⟩, ⟨у⟩, ⟨о⟩, ⟨и⟩, ⟨е⟩ or ⟨ъ⟩. Soft consonants appear before ⟨я⟩, ⟨ю⟩, or ⟨ьо⟩. In certain contexts, the contrast hard/soft contrast is neutralized. For example, in Eastern dialects, only soft consonants appear before /i/ and /ɛ/. /l/ varies: one of its allophones, involving a raising of the back of the tongue and a lowering of its middle part (thus similar or, according to some scholars, identical to a velarized lateral), occurs in all positions, except before the vowels /i/ and /ɛ/, where a more "clear" version with a slight raising of the middle part of the tongue occurs. The latter pre-front realization is traditionally called "soft l" (though it is not phonetically palatalized). In some Western Bulgarian dialects, this allophonic variation does not exist.

Furthermore, in the speech of many young people the more common and arguably velarized allophone of /l/ is often realized as a labiovelar approximant [w]. This phenomenon, sometimes colloquially referred to as мързеливо л ('lazy l') in Bulgaria, was first registered in the 1970s and is not connected to original dialects. Similar developments, termed L-vocalization, have occurred in many languages, including Polish, Slovene, Serbo-Croatian, Brazilian Portuguese, French, and English.

=== Palatalization ===
Palatalization refers to a type of consonant articulation, where a secondary palatal movement similar to that for /i/ is superimposed on the primary movement associated with the consonant's plain counterpart. During the palatalization of most hard consonants (bilabial, labiodental and denti-alveolar consonants), the middle part of the tongue is raised toward the hard palate and the alveolar ridge, which leads to the formation of a second articulatory centre whereby the specific palatal "clang" of the soft consonants is achieved. The articulation of palatalised alveolars /l/, /n/ and /r/ normally does not follow that rule. The palatal clang is instead achieved by moving the place of articulation further back towards the palate so that /ʎ/, /ɲ/ and /rʲ/ actually become alveopalatal (postalveolar) consonants. In turn, the articulation of soft /ɡ/ and /k/ (transcribed as /ɡʲ/ and /kʲ/ or /ɟ/ and /c/) moves from the velum towards the palate, and they are therefore considered palatal consonants.

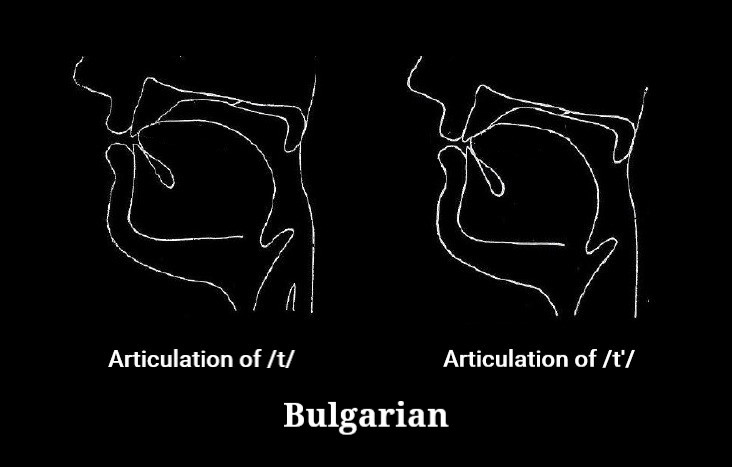
Articulation of /t/ and /tʲ/ in Contemporary Standard Bulgarian

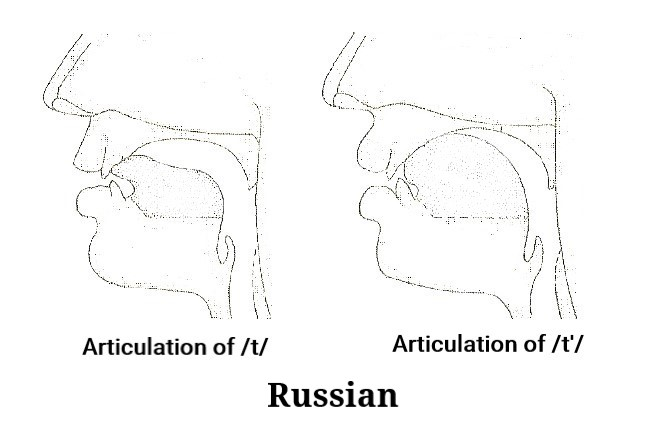
Articulation of /t/ and /tʲ/ in Russian

However, the only articulatory study of palatalized consonants in Bulgarian, conducted by Stoyko Stoykov via X-ray tracings of vocal tract configurations of hard/palatalised consonant pairs, indicates that the secondary palatal movement is missing (or severely weakened) during the articulation of a number of palatalized consonants. Only the articulation of bilabial and labiodental consonants (/pʲ/, /bʲ/, /mʲ/, /fʲ/, /vʲ/) is accompanied by a noticeable raising of the body of the tongue towards the palate, but only to a moderate extent. The articulation of soft /k/, /ɡ/ and /x/ (/c/, /ɟ/ and /ç/) also shows distinctive palatalization, as the place of articulation moves onto the palate.

However, in denti-alveolars (/tʲ/, /dʲ/, /tsʲ/, /dzʲ/, /sʲ/, /zʲ/), the place of articulation neither shifts towards the palate, nor is the tongue raised. Instead, they are articulated with the blade of the tongue (laminally) rather than the tip (apically), which results in greater surface contact of the tongue front and a modification of the primary articulatory gesture. Stoykov defines them as "weakly palatalized", while Scatton notes that the position of the mid-tongue in palatalized stops is not much higher than that in their plain counterparts. A comparison with the articulation of the same consonants in a language where palatal consonants indisputably exist, such as Russian, reveals drastically different articulation, with Bulgarian being completely non-conformant with the definition of palatalization. A comparison of the articulation of bilabials and labiodentals (/pʲ/, /bʲ/, /mʲ/, /fʲ/, /vʲ/) in Bulgarian also reveals a much less pronounced secondary palatal gesture than in Russian.

The articulation of /ʎ/, /ɲ/ and /rʲ/ is very similar to that of the denti-alveolars, but with a slight shift of the place of articulation towards the palate and some raising of the mid-tongue towards the palate. According to Stoykov, /ʎ/ and /ɲ/ are harder than their counterparts in the other Slavic languages, while /rʲ/ is just as palatal. Based on Stoykov's study, several foreign and Bulgarian phonologists have noted that distinctive palatalization in Bulgarian can be only claimed in the cases of /c/, /ɟ/, /ʎ/ and /ɲ/, or /c/, /ɟ/, /ç/ and /ʎ/.

Moreover, a study of the perception of hard and palatalized consonants conducted by Tilkov in 1983 indicated that with the exception of palatalized velars (/c/, /ɟ/, /ç/), Bulgarian listeners needed to hear the transition to the vowel to correctly identify a consonant as soft. All this has raised the question whether Bulgarian palatals have indeed lost their secondary articulatory gesture and have decomposed into CjV sequences, as claimed by Danchev, Ignatova-Tzoneva, Choi, etc.

A 2012 perception study of palatalized consonants in Bulgarian compared with a language where palatalization is indisputed (Russian) and a language where such consonants are undoubtedly articulated as CjV clusters (English) concluded that unlike English listeners, Russian and Bulgarian listeners could identify a palatal(ized) consonant without waiting for the transition to the following vowel. The study also found similarities in the phonetic shape of palatal(ized) consonants in Bulgarian and Russian and marked differences between those in the two languages and English, disproving the hypothesis for the decomposition of palatalization put forward by Horalek, Ignatova-Tzoneva, Choi, etc. Nevertheless, based on the phonological distribution of Bulgarian palatals, which was similar to that in English and completely different from that in Russian, the author argued in favour of CjV notation.

==== Palatalization of *tj/*gt/*kt and *dj in Bulgarian ====
While the results of the three Slavic palatalizations are generally the same across all or most Slavic languages, the palatalization of *tj (and the related *gti and *kti) and *dj in Late Common Slavic led to vastly divergent result in each individual Slavic language.

Reflexes of Proto-Slavic *dj and *tj/*gti/*kti in Old Church Slavonic (OCS) and modern Slavic languages
Proto-Slavic	Old Church Slavonic	Bulgarian	Macedonian	Serbo-Croatian	Slovenian	Slovak	Czech	Polish	Russian
*dʲ medja ('boundary')	жд ([ʒd])	жд ([ʒd])	ѓ (/ɟ/)	ђ (/d͡ʑ/)	j (/j/)	dz (/d͡z/)	z (/z/)	dz (/d͡z/)	ж (/ʐ/)
*dʲ medja ('boundary')	межда	межда	меѓа	међа	meja	medza	mez	miedza	межа
*tʲ světja ('candle')	щ ([ʃt])	щ ([ʃt])	ќ (/c/)	ћ (/t͡ɕ/)	č (/t͡ʃ/)	c (/t͡s/)	c (/t͡s/)	c (/t͡s/)	ч (/t͡ɕ/)
*tʲ světja ('candle')	свѣща	свещ	свеќа	свећа	sveča	svieca	svíce	świeca	свеча
*ɡti mogti ('might')	щ ([ʃt])	щ ([ʃt])	ќ (/c/)	ћ (/t͡ɕ/)	č (/t͡ʃ/)	c (/t͡s/)	c (/t͡s/)	c (/t͡s/)	ч (/t͡ɕ/)
*ɡti mogti ('might')	мощь	мощ	моќ	моћ	moč	moc	moc	moc	мочь
*kti nokti ('night')	щ ([ʃt])	щ ([ʃt])	ќ (/c/)	ћ (/t͡ɕ/)	č (/t͡ʃ/)	c (/t͡s/)	c (/t͡s/)	c (/t͡s/)	ч (/t͡ɕ/)
*kti nokti ('night')	нощь	нощ	ноќ	ноћ	noč	noc	noc	noc	ночь

Bulgarian *tj/*kti/*gti and *dj reflexes ⟨щ⟩ ([ʃt]) and ⟨жд⟩ ([ʒd]), which are exactly the same as in Old Church Slavonic, and the near-open articulation [æ] of the Yat vowel (ě), which is still widely preserved in a number of Bulgarian dialects in the Rhodopes, Pirin Macedonia (Razlog dialect) and northeastern Bulgaria (Shumen dialect), etc., are the strongest evidence that Old Church Slavonic was codified on the basis of a Bulgarian dialect and that Bulgarian is its closest direct descendant. Though the ⟨ʃt⟩/⟨ʒd⟩ speaking area currently covers only the territory of the Republic of Bulgaria and the eastern half of the wider region of geographical Macedonia, toponomy containing ⟨ʃt⟩ and ⟨ʒd⟩ that goes back to the Early Middle Ages is widely preserved across Northern and Central Greece, Southern Albania, the Republic of Macedonia, Kosovo and the Torlak-speaking regions in Serbia.

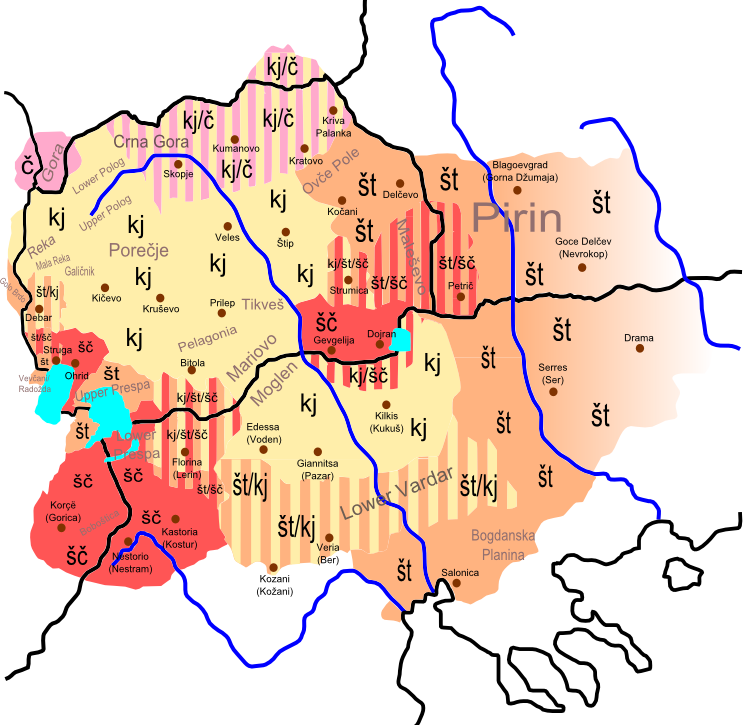
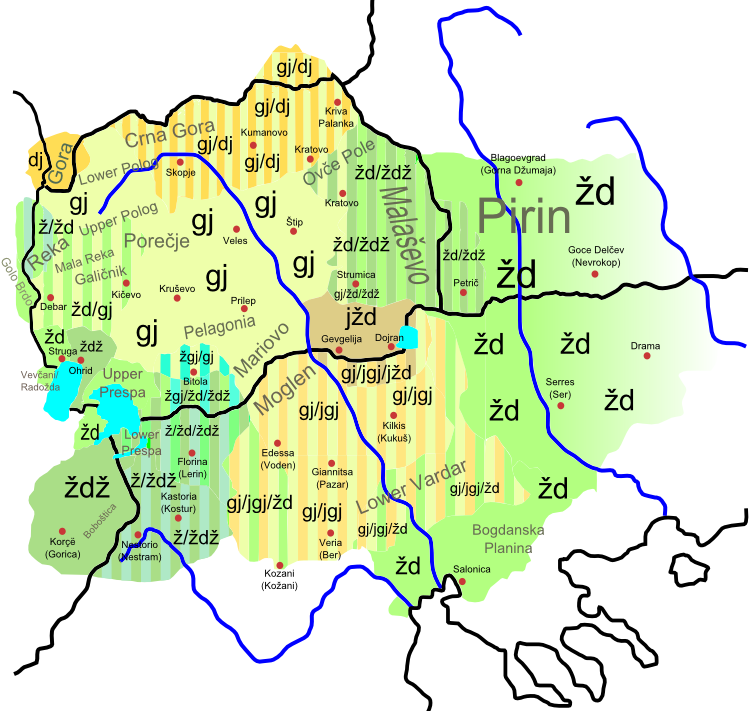
Reflexes of Proto-Slavic *tʲ/kt and *dʲ in the wider Macedonian region

For example, in the Struga municipality, the names of 13 out of 43 villages contain either ⟨ʃt⟩ (Kališta, Korošišta, Labuništa, Moroišta, Piskupština, Radolišta, Tašmaruništa, Velešta and Vraništa) or ⟨ʒd⟩ (Delogoždi, Mislodežda, Radožda and Zbaždi). The same applies to Kosovo, where Russian Slavist Afanasiy Selishchev found a number of place names around the city of Prizren featuring the Bulgarian clusters ⟨ʃt⟩/⟨ʒd⟩ in a Serbian official document from the 1300s (Nebrěgošta, Dobroušta, Sěnožeštani, Graždenikī, Obražda, Ljubižda, etc.). At present, a total of 8 villages out of 76 villages in the Prizren municipality still feature the Bulgarian consonant clusters ⟨ʃt⟩/⟨ʒd⟩, even though the region has not been ruled by Bulgaria in eight centuries: Lubizhdë, Lubizhdë e Hasit, Poslishtë, Skorobishtë, Grazhdanik, Nebregoshtë, Dobrushtë, Kushtendil. There are also numerous toponyms with the two clusters in the districts of Vranje, Pirot, Knjaževac, etc. in Serbia proper.

The development of ⟨ʃt⟩ > /c/ and ⟨ʒd⟩ > /ɟ/ in certain dialects in the geographic region of Macedonia is a late and partial phenomenon dating back to the Late Middle Ages, probably caused by the influence of Serbian /t͡ɕ/ and /d͡ʑ/, and possibly aided by the Late Middle Bulgarian's trend to palatalise /t/ and /d/ and then transform them into soft k and g > /c/ and /ɟ/.

=== Phonation ===
Phonation is a primary distinctive feature for obstruents in Bulgarian, dividing them into voiced and voiceless consonants. Obstruents form 8 minimal pairs: /p/↔/b/, /f/↔/v/, /t/↔/d/, /t͡s/↔/d͡z/, /s/↔/z/, /ʃ/↔/ʒ/, /t͡ʃ/↔/d͡ʒ/, /k/↔/ɡ/. The only obstruent without a counterpart is the voiceless fricative /x/, whose voiced counterpart /ɣ/ does not exist as a separate phoneme in Bulgarian. The sonorants /m/, /n/, /l/ and /r/ and the approximant /j/ are always voiced.

If the existence of separate palatalised consonant phonemes (39-consonant model) is accepted, 6 more contrastive obstruent pairs are added: /pʲ/↔/bʲ/, /fʲ/↔/vʲ/, /tʲ/↔/dʲ/, /sʲ/↔/zʲ/, /tsʲ/↔/dzʲ/, /ɟ/↔/c/, for a total of 14.

==== Voicing, devoicing, assimilation, sandhi, ellision ====
Like all other Slavic languages apart from Serbo-Croatian and Ukrainian, Bulgarian features word-final devoicing of obstruents, unless the following word begins with a voiced consonant. Thus, град is pronounced [ˈɡrat] ('city'), жив is pronounced [ˈʒif] ('alive'). While obstruents devoice before enclitics (град ли [ˈɡratli] ('a city?')), they do not devoice at the end of prepositions followed by a voiced consonant (под липите [podliˈpitɛ] ('under the lindens')).

CSB also features regressive assimilation in consonant clusters. Thus, voiced obstruents devoice if they are followed by a voiceless obstruent (e.g., изток is pronounced [ˈistok]) ('East')), and voiceless obstruents voice if they are followed by a voiced obstruent (e.g., сграда is pronounced [ˈzɡradɐ] ('building')).

Assimilation also occurs across word boundaries (in the form of sandhi), for example, от гората is pronounced [odɡoˈratɐ] ('from the forest'), while над полето becomes [natpoˈlɛto] ('above the field').

The consonants /t/ and /d/ in consonant clusters such as стн [stn] and здн [zdn] are usually not pronounced, unless the articulation is very careful, i.e., вестник tends to pronounced as [ˈvɛsnik] ('newspaper'), while бездна tends to pronounced as [ˈbeznɐ]) ('abyss').

==== Distribution of voiced and voiceless consonants in Bulgarian ====
Distribution of Voiced & Voiceless Consonants in Standard Bulgarian
Position	Consonant																					
Position	b	p	v	f	d	t	z	s	d͡z^{a}	t͡s	ʒ	ʃ	d͡ʒ	t͡ʃ	ɡ	k	x	m	l	n	r	j
Position I: Before central and back vowels (/a/, /ɤ/, /ɔ/, /u/)	check	check	check	check	check	check	check	check	check	check	check	check	check	check	check	check	check	check	check	check	check	check
Position II: Before front vowels (/ɛ/, (/i/)	check	check	check	check	check	check	check	check	check	check	check	check	check	check	check	check	check	check	check	check	check	check
Position III: Before sonorants (/m/, /n/, /r/, /l/)	check	check	check	check	check	check	check	check	X mark	check	check	check	check	check	check	check	check	check	check	check	check	check
Position IV: Before /v/	check	check	check	check	check	check	check	check	X mark	check	check	check	check	check	check	check	check	check	check	check	check	check
Position V: Word finally	X mark	check	X mark	check	X mark	check	X mark	check	X mark	check	X mark	check	X mark	check	X mark	check	check	check	check	check	check	check
Position VI: Before voiceless consonants	X mark	check	X mark	check	X mark	check	X mark	check	X mark	check	X mark	check	X mark	check	X mark	check	check	check	check	check	check	check
Position VII: Before voiced consonants	check	X mark	check	X mark	check	X mark	check	X mark	X mark	X mark	check	X mark	check	X mark	check	X mark	X mark	check	check	check	check	check

^a The very limited distribution of /d͡z/ is yet another indicator that it is unable to function as a fully-fledged phoneme in CSB and should instead be regarded as an allophone of /z/, as suggested by Scatton.

=== Consonant classification based on place and manner of articulation ===
==== Place of articulation ====
The consonants:

- п (/p/), б (/b/), and м (/m/) are bilabial;
- ф (/f/), в (/v/) and the allophone of /m/ and /n/ before /f/ and /v/, [ɱ], are labiodental;
- т (/t/), д (/d/), ц (/t͡s/), дз (/d͡z/), с (/s/), з (/z/) and the velar allophone of л, [ɫ], are dento-alveolar and sometimes also even described as dental;
- р (/r/) and н (/n/), as well the "light" л (/l/) are alveolar;
- ш (/ʃ/), ж (/ʒ/), ч (/t͡ʃ/) and дж (/d͡ʒ/) are postalveolar;
- й (/j/) is palatal; and
- к (/k/), г (/ɡ/), х (/x/), along with the allophone of /n/ before velars, [ŋ], are velar.

The palatalized allophones of

- п (/p/), б (/b/), м (/m/), ф (/f/) and в (/v/) are pronounced by many Bulgarians as sequences of C+j.;
- т (/t/), д (/d/), ц (/t͡s/), дз (/d͡z/), с (/s/) and з (/z/) remain dento-alveolar but are articulated with the back of the tip of the tongue (laminally) rather than with the tip (apically);
- р (/r/), н (/n/) and л (l) shift towards the palatum and become alveo-palatal; and
- к (/k/), г (/ɡ/) and х (/x/) are articulated at the back of the palatum instead of the velum.

==== Manner of articulation ====
- Plosives (7): п (/p/), б (/b/), т (/t/), д (/d/), к (/k/), г (/ɡ/);
- Fricatives (7): ф (/f/), в (/v/), с (/s/), з (/z/), ш (/ʃ/), ж (/ʒ/), х (/x/);
- Affricates (4): ц (/t͡s/), дз (/d͡z/), ч (/t͡ʃ/) and дж (/d͡ʒ/);
- Nasals (2): м (/m/) and н (/n/)
- Trills (1): р (/r/)
- Laterals (1): л (/l/)
- Approximants (1): й (/j/)

=== Two schools of thought on Bulgarian consonantism ===
The main point of contention between the two schools of thought on Bulgarian consonantism has been whether palatalized consonants should be defined as separate phonemes or simply as allophones of their respective hard counterparts.

The first or the "traditionalist" school of thought developed gradually by consensus over the course of many decades, crystallized in the late 1930s and early 1940s and was reinvigorated after the fall of the totalitarian regime. It posits that Bulgarian has no palatal or palatalized consonants other than /j/, that Trubetzkoy's 17 palatalized consonants are merely (positional) allophones of hard consonants and that the Bulgarian language therefore has only 28 phonemes. It has proposed alternative notation of palatalized consonants in the form of C-j-V (consonant-glide-vowel) clusters and has made a tentative hypothesis about the decomposition of Bulgarian palatals into consonants + glide using the following arguments:

- Unlike the palatal consonants in other Slavic languages, which can usually be found in all positions, palatalized consonants in Bulgarian have very limited distribution: only before central or back vowels, and then only if there is a /j/ before the vowel, noted graphically with the letters ⟨я⟩ [ja]/[jɤ], ⟨ю⟩ [ju] or ⟨ьо⟩ [jɔ].
- The enormous number of palatal or palatalized consonants claimed contradicts the historical development of Bulgarian and the South Slavic languages in general towards depalatalization, especially considering that there were only 9 or 10 palatal consonants in Old and Middle Bulgarian and that four of them have since hardened or are no longer used.
- The reanalysis would make it possible to make sense of sequences like ям [ˈjam] ('(I) eat') ↔ изям [iˈzʲam] ('(I) eat till the last crumb') ↔ доям [doˈjam] ('(I) finish eating something') ↔ отям [oˈtʲam] ('(I) eat to my heart's content'), where a root is considered to be iotated in some cases and to palatalize the previous consonant in others.
- Stoykov, Andreychin and Tilkov have all provided eyewitness accounts that the pronunciation of so-called palatalized consonants as consonant + /j/ is common among Bulgarian speakers and predominates in Western Bulgaria.
- The swift adoption of an approach that looks tailored to Russian but has proven a remarkably poor fit for Bulgarian at a time when Bulgaria was governed by a totalitarian regime completely subservient to the Soviet Union is suspicious and is most likely the result of Soviet duress and/or influence.

The second school of thought came to being rather unexpectedly in the late 1940s, as a refinement of Trubetzkoy's rough draft a decade before. It quickly gained currency in the state apparatus as the only theory, most likely because it used the same approach as in Russian, which was vital for a government so tied to Moscow. It posits that apart from ⟨й⟩ (/j/), there are 17 separate palatal phonemes that are in minimal pairs with their hard counterparts, including дз' (/d͡zʲ/) and х' (/ç/), which are not found in any native Bulgarian words and were excluded from Trubetzkoy's draft. Thus, only 5 consonants are not in minimal pairs, ⟨ч⟩ (/t͡ʃ/), ⟨дж⟩ (/d͡ʒ/), ⟨ш⟩ (/ʃ/) and ⟨ж⟩ (/ʒ/), which are only hard, and the glide ⟨й⟩ (/j/), which is only soft. They argue that Bulgarian phonemic inventory consists of a total of 45 phonemes, whereof 6 vowels, 1 semivowel and 38 consonants, and present the following arguments:

- Even though the distribution of palatalized consonants is limited, there is still a large number of Bulgarian words can be distinguished only by the difference in palatalization, e.g. гол [gɔɫ] ('nude/naked') vs. гьол [gʲɔɫ] ('puddle'); лук [ɫuk] ('onion') vs. люк [ʎuk] ('hatch'); дал [daɫ] ('to have given') vs/ дял [dʲaɫ] ('share');
- Palatal consonants cannot be considered to be formed by their hard counterparts by adding (/j/), as there is a clear auditory difference between pronouncing a soft consonant (as in Russian) and pronouncing a consonant and a glide (as in English). A 2012 comparative study of palatal phonemes in Russian, palatalized phonemes in Bulgarian and CjV clusters in English has deduced that the phonetic and auditory properties of Bulgarian palatals are similar to those in Russian and deviate substantially from the English consonant + glide sequences and that Bulgarian and Russian listeners did not need to wait for formant transitions to identify a consonant as palatal/palatalized unlike English listeners.

=== Historical development of Bulgarian consonantism ===
Proto-Slavic underwent three separate rounds of palatalization and one of iotation, forming nine soft (palatal or palatalized) consonants in addition to the original palatal consonant /j/.

By the Old Bulgarian period, there were only four consonants forming contrastive pairs: р (/r/) and р' (/rʲ/), н (/n/) and н' (/ɲ/), л (/l/) and л' (/ʎ/), с (/s/) and с' (/sʲ/). Three consonants were only hard: к (/k/), г (/g/) and х (/x/), six were only soft: /ʃ/, /ʒ/, /t͡ʃ/, /t͡sʲ/, /d͡zʲ/ and /j/, while the remaining eight consonants were generally hard, but could be semi-palatalized: б (/b/), в (/β/), д (/d/), ꙁ (/z/), м (/m/), п (/p/), т (/t/) and ф (/f/).

Historical phonetician Anna-Maria Totomanova has expressed a slightly divergent opinion: the four hard/palatal contrastive pairs were again /r/ and /rʲ/, /n/ and /ɲ/, /l/ and /ʎ/, /s/ and /sʲ/, 11 consonants, /p/, /b/, /m/, (/f/, /β/), /d/, /t/, /z/, /k/, /g/ and /x/, were only hard, and six consonants, /ʃ/, /ʒ/, /t͡ʃ/, /t͡sʲ/, /d͡zʲ/ and /j/, along with the typically Bulgarian consonant combinations ⟨щ⟩ [ʃt] and ⟨жд⟩ [ʒd], were only soft. Finally, Huntley mentions 9 palatal consonants: /ʃ/, /ʒ/, /t͡ʃ/, /t͡sʲ/, /d͡zʲ/ and /j/, which were only soft, and /ɲ/, /ʎ/ and /rʲ/, which could also be hard. Both Haralampiev and Totomanova have noted a marked trend towards consonant hardening.

Eventually, /ʃ/, /ʒ/ and /t͡ʃ/ hardened permanently (/t͡sʲ/ also hardened, although it later acquired a soft variant), /d͡zʲ/>/d͡z/ disappeared from the phonemic inventory, and ⟨дж⟩ (/d͡ʒ/) was borrowed from Ottoman Turkish as only hard. But before that, two phenomena led to the palatalization of more consonants: a second iotation and the dissolution of the yat vowel. As a result of the contraction and closure of the syllable in the Middle Bulgarian period, unstressed /i/ in many cases turned into the semivowel /j/ or attached to a consonant, palatalising it. Thus, Old Bulgarian свиниꙗ [sviˈnija] ('swine') contracted into свиня [sviˈɲa] and братиꙗ [ˈbratija] ('brothers') into братя [ˈbratʲɐ].

In many dialects, the resulting palatalised т' (/tʲ/) and д' (/dʲ/) turned into palatalised к' (/c/) and г' (/ɟ/). These were subsequently eliminated from CSB as dialecticisms, e.g., цвет'e [ˈt͡svɛtʲɛ] ('flower')→ цвек'е [ˈt͡svɛkʲɛ] → Ø. The form accepted in the literary language was instead the unpalatalised цвете [ˈt͡svɛtɛ] based on the Old Bulgarian form.

The dissolution of the yat happened somewhat later, towards the end of the Middle Bulgarian period and had different effects on the various dialects. In most of the East, yat in a stressed syllable softened the preceding consonant and turned into /a/. In the West, however, it led to /ɛ/ in both stressed and unstressed syllables producing no palatalisation anywhere. This was one of the main factors that led to the markedly different patterns of palatalisation in Western and Eastern Bulgarian dialects, i.e., strong palatalisation of only 5 consonants in the West vs. moderate palatalisation of almost all consonants in the East.

=== Development of phonological theory before 1945 ===
The first Bulgarian grammar to mention phonetics is Ivan Bogorov's First Bulgarian Grammar, where he identified 22 consonants, however, including among them ⟨щ⟩ (ʃt), ⟨ъ⟩ and ⟨ь⟩ (no phonemic status at word end). The first Bulgarian man of letters to correctly identify the 21 consonants in Bulgarian was Ivan Momchilov, in 1868. According to Momchilov, Bulgarian consonants could sound hard or soft, entirely depending on the vowel accompanying them.

Phonetics only started developing seriously after World War I, and towards the 1930s, all major Bulgarian linguists had reached consensus that Bulgarian phonemic inventory consisted of 28 phonemes. Out of the six major Bulgarian grammars published in the Interwar period, five explicitly mention the existence of 22 consonants (including the semivowel /j/) and 6 vowels: Petar Kalkandzhiev, Aleksandar Teodorov-Balan, who suggested 26 certain phonemes + 2 conditional ones (for the non-native and infrequent ⟨дж⟩ (/d͡ʒ/) and ⟨дз⟩ (/d͡z/)), Dimitar Popov, who posited that the only soft or palatal phoneme in Bulgarian was ⟨й⟩ (/j/), as well as Lyubomir Andreychin, who considered that even though palatalised consonants had distinctive articulation, they did not deserve phonemic status. All phoneticians referenced palatalisation extensively, but without ascribing phonemic value to the resulting sounds. Moreover, according to Stefan Mladenov,

"If we disregard individual cases of old, stronger palatalization, which may be found in Eastern and Western dialects alike, Contemporary Standard Bulgarian has developed a very distinctive "semi-palatalization", which is often neglected."

This was a result of the attempts to unify the extremely divergent patterns of Eastern and Western palatalization into a common standard in the 1800s and early 1900s, which eventually led to its general elimination from the standard language. Examples include the complete elimination of end-word palatals in a number of words ending in ⟨р'⟩ (/rʲ/), ⟨н'⟩ (/ɲ/), ⟨л'⟩ (/ʎ/) and ⟨т'⟩ (/tʲ/), e.g., writing and saying кон [kɔn] ('horse') instead of ~~конь~~ [kɔɲ], път [pɤt] ('road') instead of ~~пъть~~ [pɤtʲ]), etc.; the adoption of the hard suffix -не instead of -нье for verbal nouns, i.e., писане [ˈpisɐnɛ] instead of ~~писанье~~ [ˈpisɐɲɛ] ('writing'); labelling palatalization before front vowels as dialectal: (поле [poˈlɛ] instead of ~~полье~~ [poˈʎɛ] ('field'), тиква [ˈtikvɐ] instead of ~~тьиква~~ [ˈtʲikvɐ] ('pumpkin')), etc. Thus, the only sanctioned palatalisation in CSB is in syllable-initial position before central and back vowels, i.e., in front of /a/, /ɤ/, /ɔ/ and /u/.

The opinions of Bulgarian linguistics were also shared by a number of foreign Slavicists. French linguist Léon Beaulieux has stated that Bulgarian is characterised by its tendency to eliminate all palatal consonants. Czech linguist Horalek claimed as early as the 1940s that palatalisation in standard Bulgarian was on its way to disappear through decomposition and the development of a specific /j/ glide and that words such as бял (white) and дядо (grandfather) were pronounced [bjaɫ] and [ˈdjado] (i.e., CjV) or even [biaɫ] and [ˈdiado] just as often as they were pronounced [bʲaɫ] and [ˈdʲado].

== Word stress ==
Stress is not usually marked in written text. In cases where the stress must be indicated, a grave accent is placed on the vowel of the stressed syllable.^{13}

Bulgarian word stress is dynamic. Stressed syllables are louder and longer than unstressed ones. As in Russian and other East Slavic languages, as well as English, Bulgarian stress is also lexical rather than fixed as in French, Latin or the West Slavic languages. It may fall on any syllable of a polysyllabic word, and its position may vary depending on the inflection and derivation, for example:

- nouns – мъ̀ж /mɤʃ/ ('man'), мъжъ̀т /mɐˈʒɤt/ ('the man'), мъжѐ /mɐˈʒɛ/ ('men'), мъжѐте /mɐˈʒɛtɛ/ ('the men')
- verbs – отѝвам /oˈtivɐm/ ('I am going'), отидѝ /otiˈdi/ ('go!')

Bulgarian stress is also distinctive: the following examples are only differentiated by stress (see the different vowels):

- nouns
  - въ̀лна /ˈvɤɫnɐ/ ('wool'), вълна̀ /vɐɫˈna/ ('wave')
  - па̀ра /ˈparɐ/ ('steam'), пара̀ /pɐˈra/ ('coin')
- verbs
  - когато до̀йде /koˈɡato ˈdɔjdɛ/ ('when he comes'), когато дойдѐ /koˈɡato dojˈdɛ/ (when he came')
  - взрѝвен /ˈvzrivɛn/ ('explosive'), взривѐн /vzriˈvɛn/ ('exploded')^{14}

Stress usually isn't signified in written text, even in the above examples, if the context makes the meaning clear. However, the grave accent may be written if confusion is likely.^{15}

The stress is often written in order to signify a dialectal deviation from the standard pronunciation:

- каза̀ ми /kɐˈza mi/ ('he told me'), instead of каза ми /ˈkazɐ mi/
- иска̀ да дойде /iˈska dɐ dɔjdɛ/ ('he wanted to come'), instead of искаше да дойде /ˈiskɐʃɛ dɐ dɔjdɛ/)^{16}
^13 For practical purposes, the grave accent can be combined with letters by pasting the symbol "̀" directly after the designated letter. An alternative is to use the keyboard shortcut Alt + 0300 (if working under a Windows operating system), or to add the decimal HTML code "&#768;" after the targeted stressed vowel if editing HTML source code. See "Accute accent" diacritic character in Unicode, Unicode character "Cyrillic small letter i with grave" and Unicode character "Cyrillic capital letter i with grave" for the exact Unicode characters that utilize the grave accent. Retrieved 2010-06-21.
^14 Note that the last example is only spelled the same in the masculine. In the feminine, neuter and the plural, it is spelled differently—e.g. vzrìvna ('explosive' fem.), vzrivèna ('exploded' fem.), etc.
^15 However, the grave accent is obligatorily used to disambiguate between the two non-stressed words—* и ('and'), ѝ ('to her'). Since many computer programs do not allow for accents on Cyrillic letters, "й" is sometimes seen instead of "ѝ".
^16 Note that in this case the accent would be written in order to differentiate it from the present tense иска да дойде /ˈiskɐ dɐ dojdɛ/ ('he wants to come').

== Bibliography ==
- Andreeva, Bistra; Barry, William; Koreman, Jacques (2013). "The bulgarian stressed and unstressed vowel system. A corpus study". Interspeech 2013. Lyon. pp. 2720–2724. doi:10.21437/Interspeech.2013-97. S2CID 34957292.
- Andreychin, Lyubomir (1950). За меките съгласни в българския език [On the Palatal Consonants in Bulgarian]. Език и литература (in Bulgarian). 4.
- Bogorov, Ivan (1848). Първичка българска словница [First Bulgarian Grammar]. Bucharest.
- Choi, Kwon-Jin (1994). Глайдовата система на българския и корейския език [The Glide System in Bulgarian and Korean]. Съпоставително езикознание/Contrastive Linguistics. 19 (2). Sofia: Sofia University.
- Choi, Kwon-Jin (1999). Фонологичността на признака мекост в съвременния български език [The Phonological Value of the Palatalisation Feature in Contemporary Bulgarian]. Български език и литература (електронна версия) (2–3).
- Danchev, Andrey (2001). Съпоставително езикознание. Теория и методология [Comparative Linguistics. Theory and Methodology]. Sofia: St. Clement of Ohrid University Publishing House.
- Dokovova, Marie; Sabev, Mitko; Scobbie, James; Lickley, Robin; Cowen, Steve (2019). "Bulgarian Vowel Reduction in Unstressed Position : an Ultrasound and Acoustic Investigation" (PDF). Proceedings of the 19th International Congress of Phonetic Sciences. Australasian Speech Science and Technology Association Inc. Canberra: 2720–2724. ISBN 9780646800691.
- Duridanov, Ivan (1991). Граматика на старобългарския език [Grammar of Old Bulgarian] (in Bulgarian). Sofia: Bulgarian Language Institute, Bulgarian Academy of Sciences. ISBN 954-430-159-3.
- Haralampiev, Ivan (2001). Историческа граматика на българския език [Historical Grammar of the Bulgarian Language] (in Bulgarian). Sofia: Faber. ISBN 954775064X.
- Ignatova-Tzoneva, Dimitrina (2008). Отново за палаталността на българските съгласни [Another Look at the Palatalisation of Bulgarian Consonants] (PDF). Научни трудове на Русенския университет. 5.3 (in Bulgarian). 47: 7–12.
- Ignatova-Tzoneva, Dimitrina; Baeva, Desislava (2009). Палатални или смекчени са българските съгласни [Are Bulgarian Consonants Palatal or Palatalised?] (PDF). Научни трудове на Русенския университет. 6.3 (in Bulgarian). 48: 17–24.
- Ignatova-Tzoneva, Dimitrina (2018). За ревизия на становището за състава на българската фонемна система [On a Revision of the Stance on the Make-Up of Bulgarian Phonemic Inventory]. Proceedings of the International Scientific Conference on Truths and Lies About Facts, News and Events (in Bulgarian). 1: 1–12. ISBN 978-619-7404-03-6.
- Ignatova-Tzoneva, Dimitrina (2010). Сравнительная характеристика мягкости консонантов в современных славянских языках [Comparison of the Degree of Consonant Palatalisation in Contemporary Slavic Languages]. Славянские языки: единицы, категории, ценностные константы: - Сб. науч. статей. 6.3 (in Russian). Volgograd: 108–120. ISBN 978-5-9669-0790-7.
- Ignatova-Tzoneva, Dimitrina (2019). Моделиране на фонемната система на съвременния български книжовен език [Modelling the Phonemic Inventory of Contemporary Standard Bulgarian] (in Bulgarian). Ruse University. ISBN 978-619-90981-1-0.
- Joshi, R. Malatesha; Aaron, P. G. (2006). Handbook of Orthography and Literacy. Taylor & Francis. ISBN 9780805846522.
- Klagstad Jr., Harold L. (1958). The Phonemic System of Colloquial Standard Bulgarian. American Association of Teachers of Slavic and East European Languages. pp. 42–54.
- Ladefoged, Peter; Maddieson, Ian (1996). The Sounds of the World's Languages. Oxford: Blackwell. ISBN 0-631-19814-8.
- Mangold, Max (1988). Увод в езикознанието с оглед и на българския език [Introduction into Linguistics Also Taking Account of the Bulgarian language]. Sofia: Sofia University.
- Mirchev, Kiril (1963). Историческа граматика на българския език [Historical Grammar of the Bulgarian Language]. Sofia: Наука и изкуство.
- Merlingen, Weriand (1957). "Zur Phonologie der sog. palatalisierten Konsonanten". Studia linguistica in honorem acad. S. Mladenov. Sofia: Bulgarian Academy of Sciences: 493–501.
- Momchilov, Ivan (1868). Грамматика на новоболгарскыя езыкъ [Grammar of New Bulgarian] (PDF) (in Bulgarian).
- Nikolov, Vasil (2020). On the Official Language of the Republic of Macedonia (PDF). Sofia: Prof. Marin Drinov Publishing House of the Bulgarian Academy of Sciences. ISBN 978-619-245-081-6.
- Padareva-Ilieva, Gergana; Mitsova, Sofiya (2014). "Is Bulgarian Language Losing Its Alveo-Dental Consonant [l]?" (PDF). International Journal of Linguistics and Communication. 2 (1). New York: 45–65. ISSN 2372-4803.
- Pritchard, Sonia (2012). A Cross-Language Study of the production and Perception of Palatalized Consonants (PDF) (Thesis). Ottawa. doi:10.20381/ruor-5807.
- Sabev, Mitko (2013). The Sound System of Standard Bulgarian.
- Scatton, Ernest A. (1984). A reference grammar of modern Bulgarian. Slavica Publishers. ISBN 9780893571238.
- Scatton, Ernest A.; Huntley, David (1993). The Slavonic Languages. London: Routledge. ISBN 0-415-04755-2.
- Selishchev, Afanasii. "The Slavonic Languages" Диалектологическое значение македонской топоними [Dialectological Meaning of Macedonian Toponyms]. Collection in Honour of the 70th Anniversary of Prof. Lyubomir Miletich. Sofia: Macedonian Scientific Institute. ISBN 0-415-04755-2.
- Shklifov, Blagoy (1995). Проблеми на българската диалектна и историческа фонетика с оглед на македонските говори [Issues in Bulgarian Dialectal and Historical Phonetics with an Eye to the Macedonian Dialects]. Sofia: Качармазов. ISBN 954603004X.
- Stoykov, Stoyko (1966). Увод във фонетиката на българския език [Introduction into Bulgarian Phonetics] (Third ed.). Sofia: Наука и изкуство.
- Teodorov-Balan, Aleksandar (1940). Нова българска граматика [New Bulgarian Grammar]. Sofia: T.F. Chipev.
- Ternes, Elmer; Vladimirova-Buhtz, Tatjana (1999). "Bulgarian". Handbook of the International Phonetic Association. Cambridge University Press. pp. 55–57. ISBN 0-521-63751-1.
- Tilkov, Dimitar (1982). Граматика на съвременния български книжовен език [Grammar of Contemporary Standard Bulgarian] (in Bulgarian). Vol. I Phonetics. Sofia: Bulgarian Academy of Sciences.
- Townsend, Charles E.; Janda, Laura A. (1996). COMMON and COMPARATIVE SLAVIC: Phonology and Inflection, with special attention to Russian, Polish, Czech, Serbo-Croatian, Bulgarian. Columbus, Ohio: Slavica Publishers, Inc. ISBN 0-89357-264-0.
- Totomanova, Ana-Maria (2014). Из българската историческа фонетика [On Bulgarian Historical Phonetics] (III ed.). Sofia: University Printing House St. Clement of Ohrid. ISBN 978-954-07-3788-1.
- Trubetzkoy, Nikolai (1971) [1939]. Principles of Phonology. Berkeley and Los Angeles: University of California Press. ISBN 0-520-01535-5.
- van Campen, Joseph; Ornstein, Jacob (1959). "Alternative Analyses of the Bulgarian Nonsyllabic Phonemes". Language. 35 (2, Part I). Linguistic Society of America: 264–270. doi:10.2307/410535. JSTOR 410535.
- Voegelin, C.F.; Voegelin, Florence (1965). "Languages of the World—Indo-European Fascicle One". Anthropological Linguistics. 7 (8). Bloomington: Indiana University.
- Zhobov, Vladimir (2004). Звуковете в българския език [Sounds in the Bulgarian Language] (in Bulgarian).
