= Leningrad People's Militia Army =

- Active: 1941
- Country: Soviet Union
- Branch: People's Militia
- Type: rifle troops
- Size: ten divisions, 17 machine-gun-artillery battalions, two tank battalions and other units
- Part of: Northern Front
- Garrison/HQ: Leningrad and environs
- Anniversaries: 27 June
- Engagements: Siege of Leningrad

Commanders
- Current commander: General Major A.I. Subbotin

The Leningrad People's Militia Army (Russian: Армия Ленинградского Народного Ополчения) (commander General Major A.I. Subbotin) was initially an all-volunteer formation of the Soviet Union raised during the Second World War for defense of Leningrad.

== Overview ==
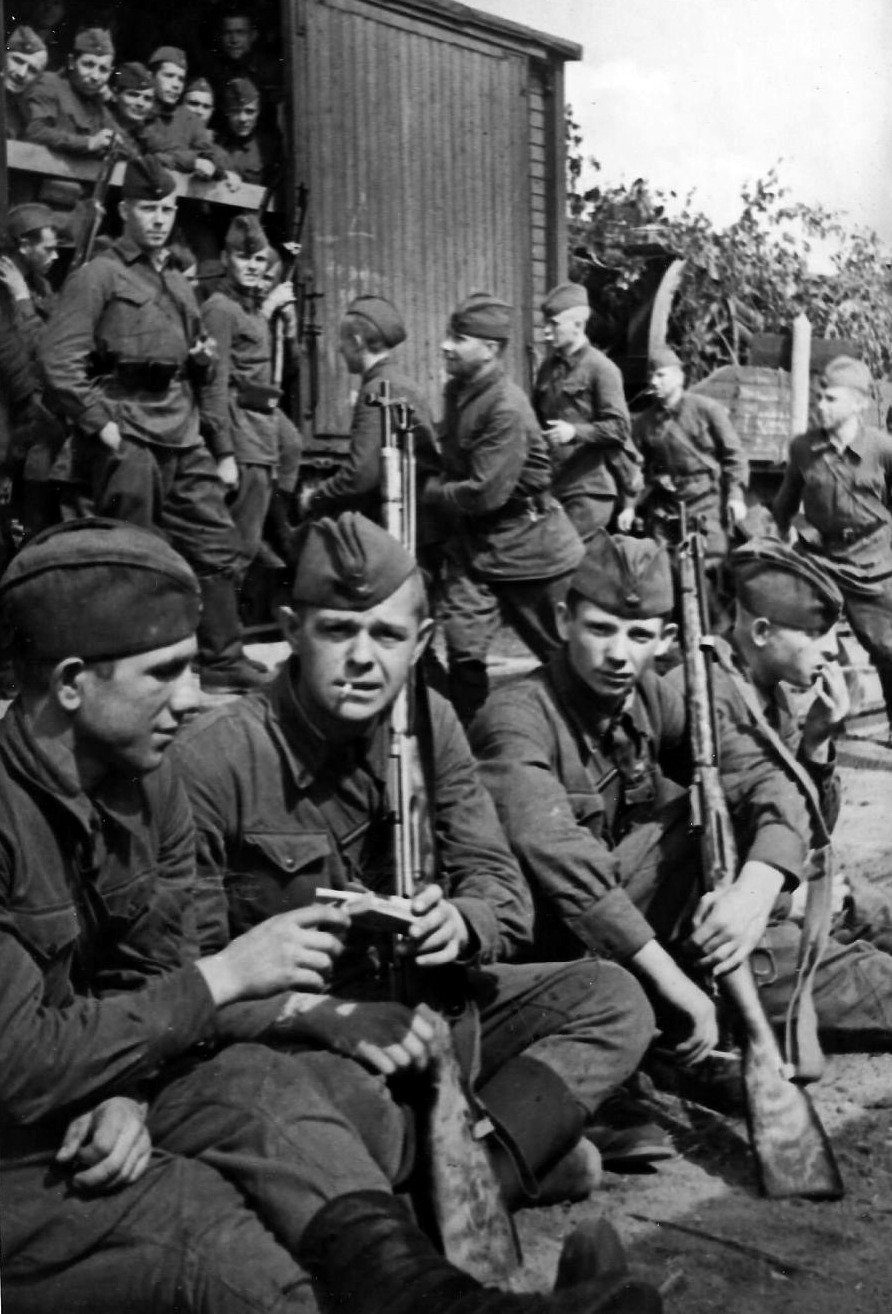
Soldiers of the Leningrad People's Militia Army on a railway platform, awaiting departure for the front, August 1941.

The Army began its creation on 27 June 1941 mostly from the previously raised 168 destroyer battalions intended to deal with expected enemy saboteurs and parachutists, reporting directly to the commander of Northern Front (Soviet Union). The personnel was drawn from the reserve officer cadres, retired officers, workers and students of Leningrad.

The initial intention was to create an army with seven divisions, but eventually 10 divisions were raised. The Army began formation on 29 June, and by 2 July, 45,183 people had been accepted as volunteers, with a proposal for a 200,000-strong Army being made by the city Communist Party Committee with a view of expansion to 15 divisions according to the number of rayons in the city. By 4 July, the number of volunteers had increased to 77,413б, and by 6 July reached 96,776.

Initially it consisted of four People's Militia divisions, but 10 were eventually raised.

== Division structure ==
The structure of eight of these was based on the field rifle divisions with three rifle regiments, one artillery regiment structure, and other units for a total of about 10–11,000 personnel.

- Divisional Headquarters
- 1st regiment (three battalions) the expected strength was 160 officers, 365 NCOs and 2162 enlisted
- 2nd regiment (three battalions)
- 3rd regiment (three battalions)
- Artillery regiment (three battalions) many equipped with tractor-towed pieces, including naval ordnance
- separate anti-aircraft divizion (replaced with machine-gun company; absent in most divisions)
- instead of the usual separate reconnaissance motor-rifle company divisions had the separate reconnaissance battalion (Russian: отдельный разведывательный батальон)(replaced with horse-mounted company in most divisions)
- Communications battalion (Russian: Батальон связи)
- Sapper battalion (Russian: Саперный батальон) (many tools were supplied by city factories)
- flamethrower platoon (Russian: Огнеметный взвод) (existence unknown)
- separate autotransport company or automobile battalion (in the 4th Light division only)
- Chemical company
- Medical and sanitary battalion
- field bakery
- livestock detachment (Russian: Гурт скота)
- military prosecutor's detachment
- separate rifle company of Special Department NKVD

== Army order of battle ==
The incomplete list of the Army units includes:

- 1st (Kirov) People's Militia Division named for the Kirovsky District (Кировский район) (commander Kombrig V.A. Malinnikov) with by 15 August had joined the retreating 70th and 237th Rifle Divisions and engaged in the fighting on approaches to Novgorod. On the 3 September its 3rd regiment was transferred to the command of the 291st Rifle Division, and replaced by the 76th Latvian Separate Rifle regiment on 14 September.
- 2nd (Moscow) People's Militia Division named for the Moskovsky District (Московский район) (Russian: 2-я (Московская) дивизия народного ополчения) (commander (to July, Colonel N.S. Ugrumov)
  - battalion of the Military-Political Border Guard School named for Voroshilov (Russian: Военно-политического пограничного училища имени Ворошилова)
  - 519th Corps (Howitzer) Artillery Regiment of Reserve of Highest Command
  - Tank battalion of the Armoured Course for Enhancement of Command Staff
- 3rd (Frunze) People's Militia Division named for the Frunzensky District (Фрунзенский район) (Russian: 3-я (Фрунзенская) дивизия народного ополчения) (commander (Colonel А.P. Netreba, from 16 August Z.N. Alekseyev) which from September was receiving volunteers from the Altai and Siberia.
- 1st Guards Division of Narodnoe Opolcheniye (Russian: 1-я гвардейская дивизия народного ополчения) (18 July 1941) (commander Colonel I.M. Frolov) (deployed next to the 237th Rifle Division) formed in the Kuybishev District. In July 1941 Vasily Margelov became the commander of the 3rd Regiment of the division.
- 2nd Guards People's Militia Division (Russian: 2-я гвардейская дивизия народного ополчения) (18 July 1941) (commander Colonel Sholev, later Colonel V.A. Trubachev) formed in the Sverdlovsk District
  - tank battalion of the Leningrad garrison
- 4th (Dzerzhinsky) Light Division of Narodnoe Opolcheniye (Russian: 4-я (Дзержинская) дивизия народного ополчения) (19 July 1941) named for the Dzerzhinsky District (Дзержинский район) (commander Colonel P.I Radigin) (1st regiment detached on 22 July to the 191st Rifle Division in Narva. This was a “light” division initially formed in the Krasnogvardeysky District (lit. Red-guards district), with only 4,257 personnel, but almost entirely motorised, and admitting only volunteers with prior combat experience. The division was allowed a period of extended combat training.
  - Separate battalion of Special Purpose (Russian: Отдельный батальон особого назначения) (commander Almazov)
- 3rd Guards Leningrad People's Militia Division (Russian: 3-я гвардейская дивизия народного ополчения) (24 July 1941) (commander Colonel V.P. Kotelnikov) which later fought with the 402nd Red Banner rifle regiment (commander Colonel Ya.S. Yermakov) of the 168th Rifle Division (commander Colonel A.L. Bondarev) formed in the Petrograd District
- 4th Guards Division of Narodnoe Opolcheniye (Russian: 4-я гвардейская дивизия народного ополчения) (27 July 1941) formed in the Kalinin District was never fully formed and on the 13 August transferred to Army reserve, its personnel used to complete units of other divisions. However, its three rifle regiments continued to participate in combat under command of other divisions, and the staff of the division was retained, and used to conduct induction training and formation, as well as command of replacement Opolcheniye battalions.
- 264th, 265th and 266th separate machinegun-artillery battalions (Russian: отдельный пулеметно-артиллерийский батальон) (264th – 277th and 282nd, 283rd and 289th battalions were created)
- 274th separate machinegun-artillery battalion was allocated to the 177th Rifle Division
- Four Izhorsk “Admiralty” battalions (later 72nd, 73rd, 74th, 75th Combat Red Banner separate machinegun-artillery battalion of the 55th Army; the battalions had a movie made about it) was created from naval ordnance manufacturing factory workers, fought in the Kolpino area.
- Several Destroyer regiments of special purpose were also formed that were eventually integrated into the regular units and partisan detachments.
- Deployed in Gatchina was the 60th destroyer battalion (Russian: истребительный батальон)
- 104th (Terioksky) destroyer battalion (104-й (Териокский) истребительный батальон) deployed in the area of Terioki (now Zelenogorsk)
- Deployed around Kolpino was the 120th destroyer battalion (120-й истребительный батальон) (commander A.I. Osovsky)
- 2nd Latvian workers regiment (commander) (Russian: 2-й Латышский рабочий полк)
- 5th (Kuybishevskaya) Division of Narodnoe Opolcheniye (Russian: 5-я дивизия народного ополчения) (1 September 1941) (commander Colonel F.P. Utkin) formed early September 1941 from the former 4th division and on the 10 September dislocated to Pulkovo.
  - 291st separate machinegun-artillery battalion (commander Captain Kaverznev)
- 6th Division of Narodnoe Opolcheniye (Russian: 4-я () дивизия народного ополчения) (1 September 1941)
- 7th Division of Narodnoe Opolcheniye (Russian: 7-я дивизия народного ополчения) (commander Colonel I.S. Kuznetsov) raised on the 17 September it was formed on the 30 September as the 56th Rifle Division.
- 277th separate machinegun-artillery battalion around Ropsha
- 83rd separate machinegun-artillery battalion (commander Lieutenant E.G. Grigoryev) around Ropsha and Kolpino

227 partisan detachments were also created, but only 67 were sent into combat with a total of 2,886 personnel to operate behind German lines.

== Combat history ==
The Army units, in cooperation with the regular Red Army formations, participated in fighting on the approaches to Leningrad and the entire Leningrad Strategic Defensive in the area of Narva - Pskov - Novgorod, primarily against the 18th Army of the Army Group North. The fighting was extremely vicious, and most divisions were reduced to 50% of their initial strength by the time they were amalgamated or integrated into the regular Red Army formations at the end of September.

On the 23 September 1941 all the divisions of the Leningrad Narodnoe Opolcheniye Army divisions were used to form Red Army units mostly within the Leningrad Front.

== Sources ==
- Narodnoe Opolcheniye in the Battle for Leningrad (A short chronology) compiled by candidate of historical sciences Yu.N. Yablochkin, taken from a reader "Opolchentsy", Lenizdat (Pub.), 1975 (НАРОДНОЕ ОПОЛЧЕНИЕ В БИТВЕ ЗА ЛЕНИНГРАД (Краткая хроника) Составлена канд. ист. наук Ю. Н. Яблочкиным. Из сборника "Ополченцы", (Лениздат, 1975)
