= Dzerzhinsky District =

Dzerzhinsky District may refer to:

- Dzerzhinsky District, Russia, name of several districts and city districts in Russia
- Dzerzhynskyi City District, the former name of the Shevchenkivskyi District, Kharkiv, Ukraine

== See also ==
- Dzerzhinsky (disambiguation)
- Dzerzhinsk (disambiguation)
