= Soviet ship Dzerzhinsky =

Dzerzhinsky is the name of the following ships of the Soviet Navy:

- Soviet battlecruiser Dzerzhinsky, a Kirov-class battlecruiser cancelled in 1990
- Soviet cruiser Dzerzhinsky, a Sverdlov-class cruiser in commission 1952–1980
- Soviet destroyer Dzerzhinsky, a Fidonisy-class destroyer, launched in 1916, sunk in 1942
- Soviet frigate Dzerzhinsky, a Krivak-class frigate, launched in 1984, decommissioned in 2023

== See also ==
- Dzerzhinsky (disambiguation)
- Feliks Dzerzhinskiy (ship)
