= Imeni Dzerzhinskogo =

Imeni Dzerzhinskogo may refer to:

- Imeni Dzerzhinskogo, Armenia, a town in Armenia
- Imeni Dzerzhinskogo, Russia, name of several rural localities in Russia
