= Dzerzhinsky =

Dzerzhinsky (masculine), Dzerzhinskaya (feminine), or Dzerzhinskoye (neuter) may refer to:

== People ==
- Felix Dzerzhinsky (1877–1926), Russian Bolshevik leader, founder of the Cheka secret police
- Ivan Dzerzhinsky (1909–1978), Russian composer
- Sofia Dzerzhinskaya (1882–1968), Polish politician

== Places ==
- Dzerzhinsky District (disambiguation), name of several districts in the countries of the former Soviet Union
- Dzerzhinsky (inhabited locality) (Dzerzhinskaya, Dzerzhinskoye), name of several inhabited localities in Russia
- Dzerzhinski, the former name of Aygevan, a village in Armenia
- Dzerzhinskoe, the former name of Besagash, a village in Kazakhstan

== Other uses ==
- Dzerzhinskaya Line, a line of the Novosibirsk Metro
- Soviet cruiser Dzerzhinsky, a Sverdlov-class cruiser
- Dzerzhinsky, a canceled Kirov-class battlecruiser
- Steam locomotive FD, also known as the Felix Dzerzhinsky-class of Soviet steam locomotives
- Dzerzhinskaya, the name of the Lubyanka station of the Moscow Metro in 1935–1990
- Dzerzhinskaya, until 1994, the name of the Universytet station of the Kharkiv Metro
- Dzerzhinskaya, former name of the Lybidska station of the Kyiv Metro
- Dzerzhynska, former name of the Mudryona station of the Kryvyi Rih Metrotram

== See also ==
- Dzerzhinsk (disambiguation)
- Imeni Dzerzhinskogo (disambiguation)
