= Dzerzhynsk =

Dzerzhynsk is name of several former toponyms in Ukraine that carried a name of a chekist of Polish descent Felix Dzerzhinsky.

It can refer to:

- Romaniv (urban-type settlement), formerly known as Dzerzhynsk
- Toretsk, formerly known as Dzerzhynsk

== See also ==
- Dzyarzhynsk, Belarus
- Dzerzhinsk (disambiguation)
