= Dzerzhinsky (inhabited locality) =

Dzerzhinsky (Russian: Дзержинский; masculine), Dzerzhinskaya (Дзержинская; feminine), or Dzerzhinskoye (Дзержинское; neuter) is the name of several inhabited localities in Russia.

Urban localities

- Dzerzhinsky, Moscow Oblast, a town under the administrative jurisdiction of Moscow Oblast

Rural localities

- Dzerzhinsky, Novosibirsk Oblast, a settlement in Iskitimsky District of Novosibirsk Oblast
- Dzerzhinsky, Voronezh Oblast, a settlement in Ertilsky District of Voronezh Oblast
- Dzerzhinskoye, Republic of Dagestan, a selo in Khasavyurtovsky District of the Republic of Dagestan
- Dzerzhinskoye, Krasnoyarsk Krai, a selo in Dzerzhinsky District of Krasnoyarsk Krai
- Dzerzhinskoye, name of several other rural localities

== See also ==
- imeni Dzerzhinskogo, Russia, name of several rural localities
