= Kirovsky City District, Murmansk =

Kirovsky City District (Russian: Ки́ровский райо́н) was a territorial division of the city of Murmansk in Murmansk Oblast, Russian SFSR, Soviet Union. It was established for the first time by the Decree of the Presidium of the Supreme Soviet of the Russian SFSR of April 20, 1939 and abolished together with the other two city districts on June 2, 1948. All three city districts, including Kirovsky, were restored on June 23, 1951, but were once again abolished on September 30, 1958.
