= Dzerzhinskoye, Republic of Dagestan =

Dzerzhinskoye Дзержинское
- Selo
- Location within Republic of Dagestan Location within Russia
- Coordinates: 43°31′N 46°28′E
- Country: Russia
- Region: Republic of Dagestan
- District: Khasavyurtovsky District
- Time zone: UTC+3:00

Dzerzhinskoye (Russian: Дзержинское) is a rural locality (a selo) in Khasavyurtovsky District, Republic of Dagestan, Russia. 2,357 (2021 census); 1,795 (2002 census); 1,302 (1989 Soviet census). There are 42 streets.

== Geography ==
Dzerzhinskoye is located 39 km north of Khasavyurt (the district's administrative centre) by road. Utsmiyurt is the nearest rural locality.
