= Lyubomir Andreychin =

Bulgarian linguist

Lyubomir Andreychin (Bulgarian: Любомир Андрейчин; 22 March 1910, in Gabrovo – 3 September 1975, in Sofia) was a Bulgarian linguist. Correspondent Member of the Bulgarian Academy of Sciences since 1951. His principal field of scientific research included the grammar and stylistics of modern Bulgarian.
