= Stoyko Stoykov =

Stoyko Ivanov Stoykov (Bulgarian: Стойко Иванов Стойков; 26 October 1912 – 9 December 1969) was a Bulgarian linguist.

== Biography ==
Graduated Slavic Philology at Sofia University "St. Kliment Ohridski", (1935). Specialized phonetics, dialectology and Slavic linguistics in Prague (1937–1939). Was granted PhD by the Univerzita Karlova (Charles University in Prague) (1939). Worked at the Institute for Bulgarian Language of the Bulgarian Academy of Sciences as an assistant (1942), as a head of the Section for Bulgarian Dialectology with Linguistic Atlas (1952–1969) and as a deputy director of the same institute (1958–1969). Also, worked in the Sofia University as an assistant (1943), associate professor (1947), and professor (1950–1969). Was Dean of the Phylological Faculty (1953/1954, 1962–1966) and Deputy Rector of the same university (1958–1960). Also, was Chairman of the Commission of Phonetics and Phonology at the International Committee of Slavists (1968/1969) and Secretary of the same Committee (1959–1964).

== Dialectology ==
Stoykov's scholarly activities were in the fields of Bulgarian Dialectology, Phonetics and Lexicology. He was author of the fundamental and still unique book "Bulgarian Dialectology", (1949, revised 1962 and 1968, posthumously 1993 and 2002). His valuable contributions are the monographies "The Banat Dialect" ("Банатският говор") (1967) and "The Lexics of the Banat Dialect" ("Лексиката на банатския говор") (1968) as well as the comparative study "The Dialect of Tvardica village (Bulgaria) and Tvardica village (Moldova)" ("Говорът на с. Твърдица (Сливенска околия в България) и на с. Твардица (Молдавска ССР)") (in Russian, 1958). Particular interest represents his study "The Sofia Student's Dialect. Contribution to Bulgarian Social Dialectology" ("Софийският ученически говор. Принос към българската социална диалектология") (1946). Stoykov was the leader and direct participant in the development of "Atlas of Bulgarian Dialects" ("Български диалектен атлас") (in 4 volumes, 1964–1981).

== Phonetics ==
Stoykov's main contributions to Bulgarian Phonetics are his studies "Bulgarian Literary Pronunciation" ("Български книжовен изговор") (1942), "Introduction in Bulgarian Phonetics" ("Увод в българската фонетика") (1955, 3rd revised edition entitled "Увод във фонетиката на българския език", 1966).

== Lexicology ==
Stoykov contributed to the development of Bulgarian Lexicography and Lexicology being co-author of "Orthographical and Orthoepy Manual" ("Правописен и правоговорен наръчник") (1945, 3rd revised edition entitled "Правописен речник на българския книжовен език", 1954) and "Bulgarian Language Dictionary" ("Български тълковен речник") (1955, 4th edition 1994), as well as one of the editors of "Dictionary of the Contemporary Bulgarian Literary Language" ("Речник на съвременния български книжовен език") (3 volumes, 1955–1959). He also published studies dedicated to the literary works of Bulgarian Renaissance writers and poets.

== Bibliography ==
Bibliography of prof. Stoykov's works as well as literature about him can be found at

- Bibliotheca Slavica – Sofia University,
- Die Deutsche Bibliotheksstatistik,
- Südwestdeutscher Bibliotheksverbund,
- The National Library of the Netherlands,
- University of California, USA
- Indiana University, USA,
- International Society of Phonetic Sciences^{[usurped]}
