= Russian frigate Dzerzhinskiy =

Krivak-class frigate

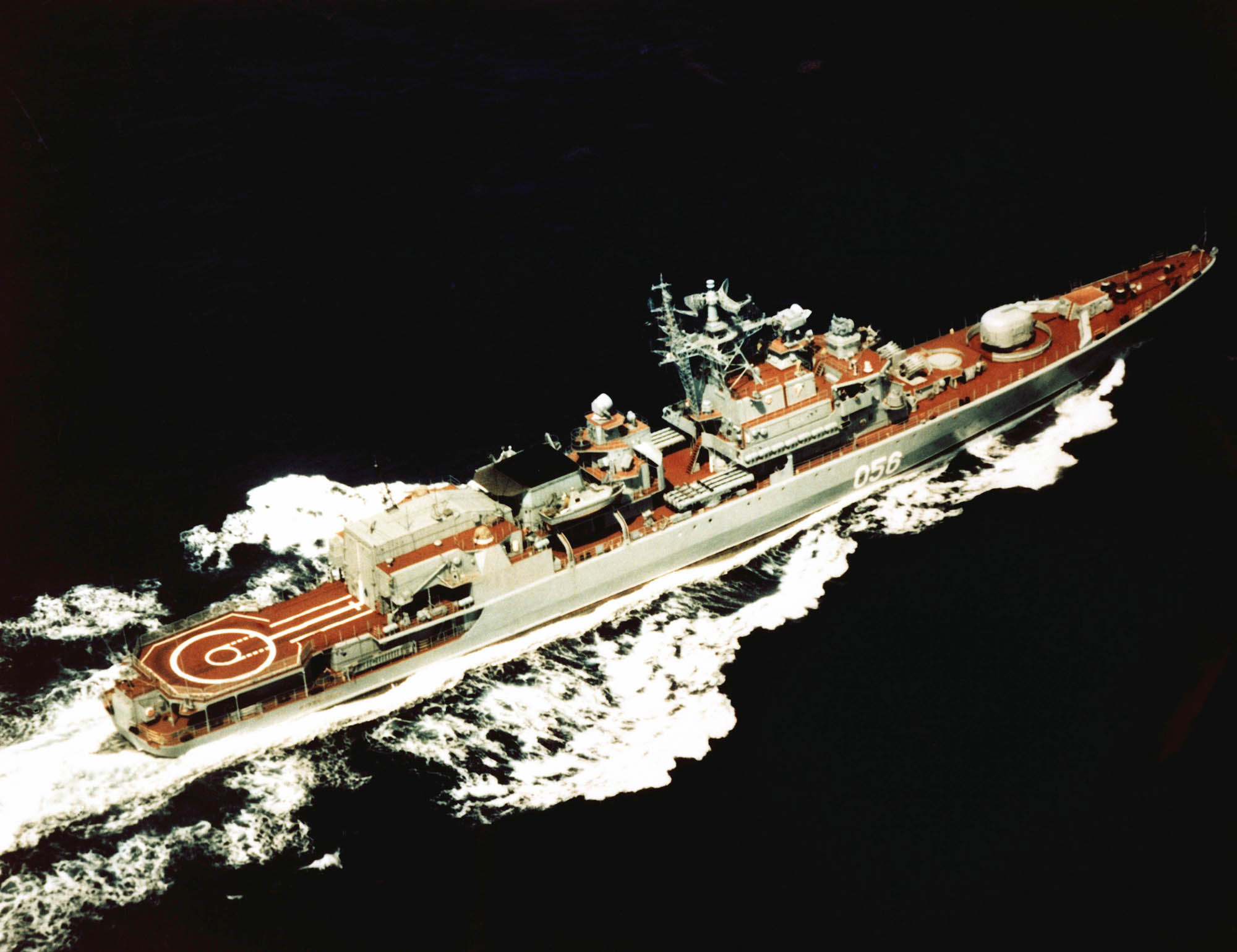
- Sister ship Menzhinskiy underway on 1 August 1985

History

→ Soviet Union → Russia
- Name: Dzerzhinskiy
- Namesake: Felix Dzerzhinsky
- Builder: Zaliv Shipyard, Kerch
- Yard number: 202
- Laid down: 20 January 1983
- Launched: 2 March 1984
- Commissioned: 29 December 1984
- Decommissioned: 14 April 2023
- Honours and awards: Order of the Red Banner
- Status: Retired

General characteristics
- Class & type: Project 11351 Nerey frigate
- Displacement: 3,070 t (3,020 long tons) (standard); 3,545 t (3,489 long tons) (full)
- Length: 123 m (403 ft 7 in)
- Beam: 14.2 m (46 ft 7 in)
- Draught: 4.72 m (15 ft 6 in)
- Installed power: 63,000 shp (47,000 kW)
- Propulsion: 4 gas turbines; COGAG; 2 shafts
- Speed: 32 kn (59 km/h)
- Range: 3,900 nmi (7,223 km) at 14 kn (26 km/h)
- Complement: 192
- Sensors & processing systems: MR-310A Angara-A air/surface search radar; Vaigach-Nayada navigational radar; MR-184 Lev fire control radar; Vympel-A fire control radar; MGK-335S Platina-S sonar; MG-345 Bronza towed sonar
- Electronic warfare & decoys: MP-401 Start ESM; PK-16 and PK-10 chaff launchers
- Armament: 2 × ZIF-122 4K33 launchers with 20 4K33 OSA-M (SA-N-4'Gecko') SAMs (1×2); 1 × 100 mm (4 in) AK-100 gun; 2 × 30 mm (1 in) AK-630M CIWS; 2 × RBU-6000 Smerch-2 anti-submarine rockets; 8 × 533 mm (21 in) torpedo tubes (2×4); 16 × naval mines
- Aircraft carried: 1 × Kamov Ka-27PS
- Aviation facilities: Helipad and hangar

Dzerzhinskiy (also transliterated Dzerzhinsky, Russian: Дзержинский) was a Project 11351 Nerey-class frigate (NATO reporting name Krivak III) of the Coast Guard of the Federal Security Service of Russia.

== Design and description ==
Dzerzhinskiy was one of nine Project 11351 ships launched between 1982 and 1992. Project 11351, the Nerey (Russian: Нерей, "Nereus") class, was the patrol version of the Project 1135 Burevestnik for the Soviet Maritime Border Troops. The ships were designated Border Patrol Ship (пограничный сторожевой корабль, PSKR) to reflect their role as patrol ships of the Border Troops. In comparison to other members of the class, Project 11351 ships has a helipad and hangar for a Kamov Ka-27PS search-and-rescue helicopter astern, in exchange to losing one 100 mm gun, one twin-arm surface-to-air missile launcher and the URPK-5 Rastrub (SS-N-14 'Silex') anti-ship missile launchers. NATO classified the vessels as 'Krivak III'-class frigates.

Dzerzhinskiy was 123 m (403 ft 7 in) long overall, with a beam of 14.2 m (46 ft 7 in) and a draught of 4.72 m (15 ft 6 in). Displacing 3,070 t (3,020 long tons) standard and 3,545 t (3,489 long tons) full load, the ship's power was provided by two 22,500 shp (16,800 kW) DT59 and two 9,000 shp (6,700 kW) DS71 gas turbines arranged in a COGAG installation, driving two fixed-pitch propellers. Design speed was 32 knots (59 km/h; 37 mph) and range 3,900 nautical miles (7,223 km; 4,488 mi) at 14 kn (26 km/h; 16 mph). The ship's complement was 192, including 31 officers.

=== Armament and sensors ===
Dzerzhinskiy was armed with one 100 mm (4 in) AK-100 gun mounted forward of the bridge and two AK-630M close-in weapon system autocannons mounted on each side of the helicopter hangar. Defence against aircraft was provided by twenty 4K33 OSA-M (SA-N-4 'Gecko') surface-to-air missiles which were launched from one set of twin-arm ZIF-122 launchers, mounted aft of the fore 100 mm gun. For anti-submarine warfare, the ship are equipped with a pair of RBU-6000 213 mm (8 in) Smerch-2 12-barrel anti-submarine rocket launchers and a pair of PTA-53-1135 quadruple launchers for 533 mm (21 in) torpedoes, consisted of either 53-65K wake homing torpedo or SET-65 anti-submarine homing torpedo. The ship can also carry 16 naval mines.

The ship sensor suites includes Sapfir-U7 combat management system, one Vaigach-Nayada navigation radar, and the MP-401 Start Electronic Support Measures (ESM) system. As with other Project 11351 ships, Dzerzhinskiy was supposed to be equipped with the more advanced MR-760 Fregat-MA air/surface radar, but due to delays the ship's radar was substituted with MR-310A Angara-A instead. Fire control for the guns consisted of MR-184 Lev radar for the 100 mm gun and Vympel-A radar for the 30 mm autocannons. An extensive sonar complex was fitted, including the bow-mounted MGK-335S Platina-S and the towed-array MG-345 Bronza. The vessel was also equipped with two PK-16 and two PK-10 decoy-dispenser system, which used chaff as a form of missile defense.

== Construction and career ==
The frigate was the second ship of the class. The keel was laid on 20 January 1983 with yard number 202 at the Zaliv Shipyard in Kerch. The ship was launched on 2 March 1984. Dzerzhinskiy was commissioned to KGB Border Troops Naval Service on 29 December 1984.

The ship was assigned to the 2nd Brigade of Border Patrol Ships, 1st Red Banner Division of Border Patrol Ships in Petropavlovsk-Kamchatsky, part of the Northeastern Border District. From 15 August to 24 September 1987, Dzerzhinskiy sailed from Sevastopol to its assigned homeport in Petropavlovsk-Kamchatsky via the Suez Canal. The ship officially entered service with the first ceremonial flag-hoisting ceremony on 19 May 1985.

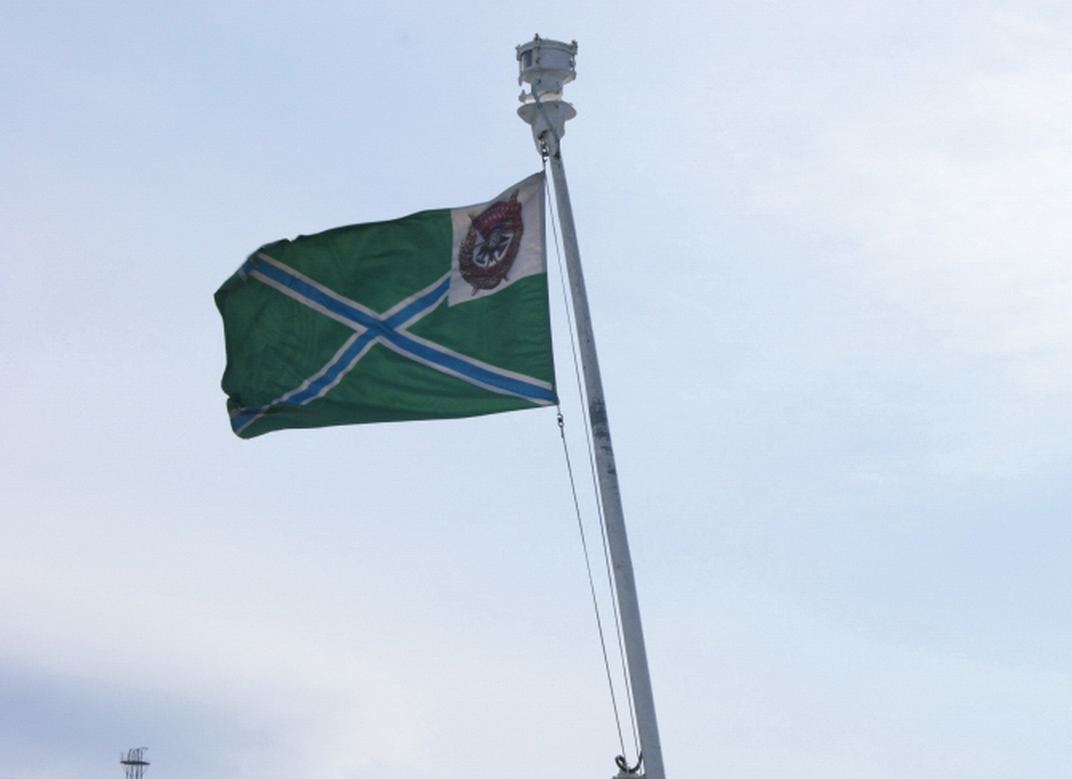
Dzerzhinskiy's coast guard ensign with the Order of the Red Banner

The Order of the Red Banner honour was first awarded to a Project 19 border patrol ship of the NKVD with the same name, which received the award on 19 September 1945 for excellent performance during the Soviet–Japanese War. The award was then passed down to the second border patrol ship named Dzerzhinskiy, a Project 264A minesweeper. The Project 11531 frigate Dzerzhinskiy inherited the award when she was launched, in conjunction with the decommissioning of the second ship on 2 March 1984.

Dzerzhinskiy was participating in an exercise with the United States Coast Guard around the waters of Northeastern Russia on 26 May 1998, when one of the American coast guard cutters radioed its Russian counterpart that there is an intruding unidentified vessel in the area, which is inside the exclusive economic zone of Russia. Dzerzhinskiy was the closest vessel to the intruder, so the ship chased and ordered the intruder to stop. The intruder, which turned out to be a Chinese seiner (a type of fishing vessel) Zong Long 37, did not yield and increased its speed. Dzerzhinskiy fired twelve warning shots at the course of Zong Long 37 and when the seiner did not responded, the frigate fired and scored a direct hit. Zong Long 37 suffered casualties of two dead and four wounded, with the other 22 crew not injured. The seiner was escorted to Petropavlovsk-Kamchatsky on 27 May, with the wounded treated at regional hospital. Around 50 tonnes of salmon and caviar along with 90 kilometers of drift nets were found on board Zong Long 37.

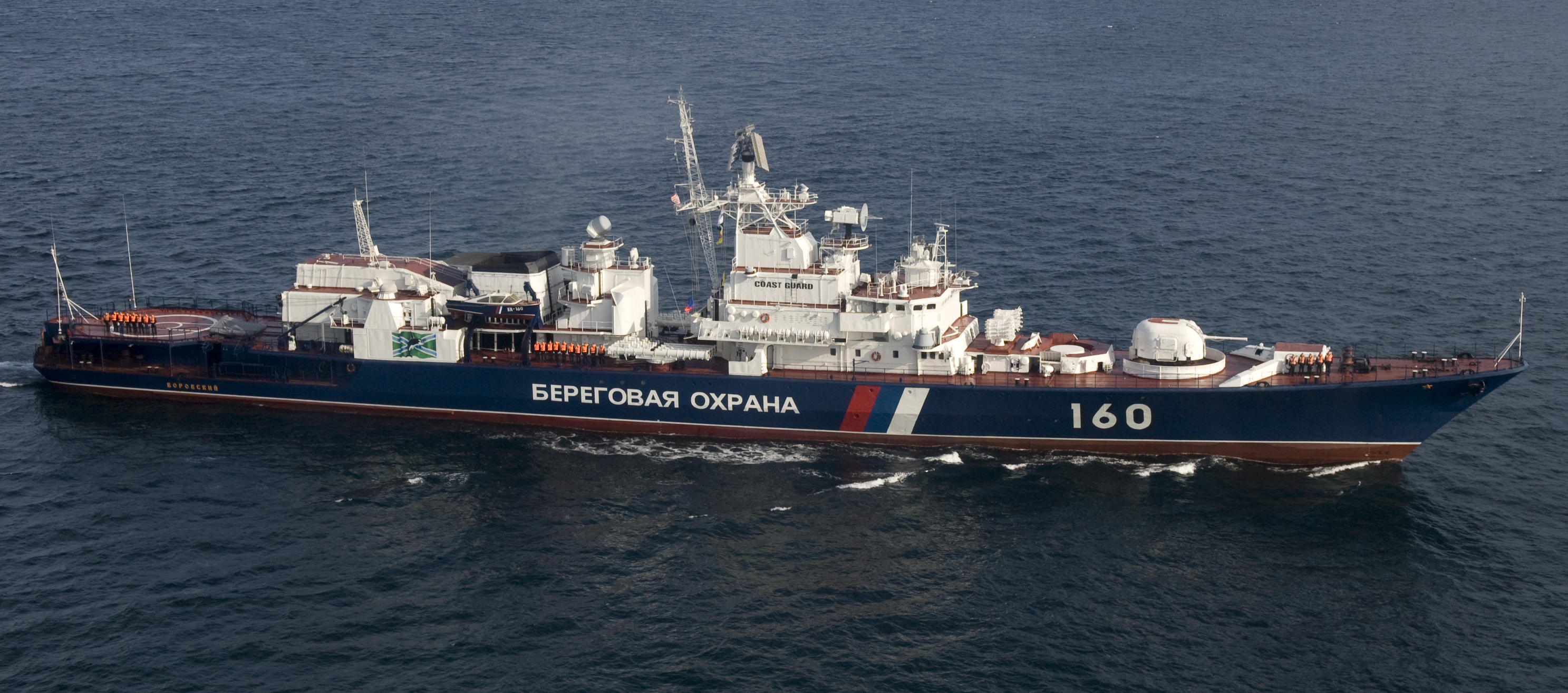
Sister ship Vorovskiy in Russian Coast Guard livery, 2009

The frigate discovered an unidentified fishing vessel around 2.3 nautical miles (4 km; 3 mi) from Medny Island, Komandorski Islands on 24 November 1999 at 07:00 local time. Dzerzhinskiy ordered the fishing vessel to stop, which was ignored and the chase ensued for 2 hours, which at that point the frigate fired a warning shot with its gun and ignored by the intruder. An hour later Dzerzhinskiy fired another warning shot. At around 13:00 the border guards were ordered to fire directly at the intruder using a Kalashnikov rifle with tracer rounds. The intruder, which was a 1,500 tonnes Japanese trawler Meise Maru 128, stopped and was boarded by personnel from Dzerzhinskiy. There were no casualties among the 27 crew members of the trawler. Meise Maru 128 was brought to Petropavlovsk-Kamchatsky on 27 November.

In June 2006, Dzerzhinskiy discovered an unidentified vessel in the Sea of Okhotsk. The frigate ordered the suspected poachers to stop to be inspected, but they evaded and started fleeing. After Dzerzhinskiy threatened to use its weapons and a Ka-27 helicopter was dispatched to search the area, the vessel stopped. The vessel's crew, turned out to be MTP Priozerny from Magadan, then started to scuttle Priozerny as the border guards approached it.

On the night of 26–27 September 2007, during the border operation "Krab-2007", a Russian border guard aircraft detected a fishing vessel in the Sea of Okhotsk with its transponder turned off, no identification marks and flag, and also did not respond to communication from the border guard. Dzerzhinskiy was sent to inspect the vessel. The fishing vessel tried to evade the border patrol ship and when Dzerzhinskiy ordered the vessel to stop, a chase ensued throughout the night. After warning shot has been fired, the unidentified vessel stopped and its crew were scuttling the fishing vessel. As Dzerzhinskiy closed in and noticed that the fishing vessel begun to list, the frigate lowered its rescue equipment. After further inspection, the fishing vessel was owned by a Sakhalin fishing company. All 17 crew members of the vessel were Russian citizen, and they were taken aboard the frigate.

As of 2022, Dzerzhinskiy was the only active vessel in the Coast Guard of Russia that was awarded with the Order of the Red Banner.

Dzerzhinskiy was decommissioned on 14 April 2023. The second ship of the Project 23550 patrol ship—its replacement—was also named Dzerzhinskiy.
