= Imeni Dzerzhinskogo, Russia =

Imeni Dzerzhinskogo (Russian: и́мени Дзержинского) or simply Dzerzhinskogo (Дзержи́нского) is the name of several rural localities in Russia:

- Dzerzhinskogo, a logging depot settlement in Luzhsky District of Leningrad Oblast
- Imeni Dzerzhinskogo, Moscow Oblast, a settlement in Mozhaysky District of Moscow Oblast
- Imeni Dzerzhinskogo, Nizhny Novgorod Oblast, a settlement in Perevozsky District of Nizhny Novgorod Oblast
- Imeni Dzerzhinskogo, Voronezh Oblast, a settlement in Kashirsky District of Voronezh Oblast

== See also ==
- Dzerzhinsky (inhabited locality)
- Yuzhnogo otdeleniya sovkhoza imeni Dzerzhinskogo, a settlement in Novousmansky District of Voronezh Oblast
