= Besagash =

Besagash Dzerzhinskoe
- Location in Kazakhstan
- Coordinates: 43°17′51″N 77°3′5″E
- Country: Kazakhstan
- Region: Almaty Region
- District: Talgar District
- Time zone: UTC+6 (Astana Time)

Besagash, previously in the Soviet era: Dzerzhinskoye is a village in Almaty Region in the south-east of Kazakhstan.
