= Dzerzhinsky District, Russia =

Dzerzhinsky District is the name of several administrative and municipal districts in Russia. The districts are generally named for Felix Dzerzhinsky, the founder of the Cheka.

== Districts of the federal subjects ==
Location of Kaluga Oblast

Location of Krasnoyarsk Krai

- Dzerzhinsky District, Kaluga Oblast, an administrative and municipal district of Kaluga Oblast
- Dzerzhinsky District, Krasnoyarsk Krai, an administrative and municipal district of Krasnoyarsk Krai

== City divisions ==
- Dzerzhinsky City District, Nizhny Tagil, a city district of Nizhny Tagil, a city in Sverdlovsk Oblast
- Dzerzhinsky City District, Novosibirsk, a city district of Novosibirsk, the administrative center of Novosibirsk Oblast
- Dzerzhinsky City District, Orenburg, a city district of Orenburg, the administrative center of Orenburg Oblast
- Dzerzhinsky City District, Perm, a city district of Perm, the administrative center of Perm Krai
- Dzerzhinsky City District, Volgograd, a city district of Volgograd, the administrative center of Volgograd Oblast
- Dzerzhinsky City District, Yaroslavl, a city district of Yaroslavl, the administrative center of Yaroslavl Oblast
Cities in Russia with a city division called "Dzerzhinsky"

== Historical districts ==
- Dzerzhinsky District, Saint Petersburg, a former district of the federal city of St. Petersburg merged into newly created Tsentralny District in March 1994

== See also ==
- Dzerzhinsky (disambiguation)
- Dzerzhinsk (disambiguation)
