= 52nd Rifle Division =

52nd Rifle Division may refer to:

- 52nd Rifle Division (RSFSR) of 1918–1921
- 52nd Rifle Division (Soviet Union, 1935–1941)
- 52nd Rifle Division (Soviet Union, 1942–1946)
- 52nd Rifle Division (Soviet Union, 1955–1957), later the 52nd Motor Rifle Division
- 52nd Motor Rifle Division, Soviet Union, 1957–1987
- 52nd Riga-Berlin Guards Rifle Division, Soviet Union, WWII

== See also ==
- 52nd Division (disambiguation)
