= Kirovsky District, Russia =

Kirovsky District is the name of several administrative and municipal divisions in Russia. The districts are generally named for Sergey Kirov, a Soviet statesman.

== Districts of the federal subjects ==
Federal subjects of Russia which have an entity called Kirovsky District

- Kirovsky District, Republic of Crimea, an administrative and municipal district in the Republic of Crimea
- Kirovsky District, Kaluga Oblast, an administrative and municipal district of Kaluga Oblast
- Kirovsky District, Leningrad Oblast, an administrative and municipal district of Leningrad Oblast
- Kirovsky District, Republic of North Ossetia-Alania, an administrative and municipal district of the Republic of North Ossetia–Alania
- Kirovsky District, Primorsky Krai, an administrative and municipal district of Primorsky Krai
- Kirovsky District, Saint Petersburg, an administrative district of the federal city of Saint Petersburg
- Kirovsky District, Stavropol Krai, an administrative and municipal district of Stavropol Krai

== City divisions ==
1. Kirovsky City District, Astrakhan, a city district of Astrakhan, the administrative center of Astrakhan Oblast
2. Kirovsky City District, Irkutsk, a city district of Irkutsk, the administrative center of Irkutsk Oblast
3. Kirovsky City District, Kazan, a city district of Kazan, the capital of the Republic of Tatarstan
4. Kirovsky City District, Kemerovo, a city district of Kemerovo, the administrative center of Kemerovo Oblast
5. Kirovsky City District, Khabarovsk, a city district of Khabarovsk, the administrative center of Khabarovsk Krai
6. Kirovsky City District, Krasnoyarsk, a city district of Krasnoyarsk, the administrative center of Krasnoyarsk Krai
7. Kirovsky City District, Makhachkala, an administrative and municipal city district of Makhachkala, the capital of the Republic of Dagestan
8. Kirovsky City District, Novosibirsk, a city district of Novosibirsk, the administrative center of Novosibirsk Oblast
9. Kirovsky Administrative Okrug, an administrative okrug of the city of Omsk, the administrative center of Omsk Oblast
10. Kirovsky City District, Perm, a city district of Perm, the administrative center of Perm Krai
11. Kirovsky City District, Rostov-on-Don, a city district of Rostov-on-Don, the administrative center of Rostov Oblast
12. Kirovsky City District, Samara, an administrative and municipal city district of Samara, the administrative center of Samara Oblast
13. Kirovsky City District, Saratov, a city district of Saratov, the administrative center of Saratov Oblast
14. Kirovsky City District, Tomsk, a city district of Tomsk, the administrative center of Tomsk Oblast
15. Kirovsky City District, Ufa, a city district of Ufa, the capital of the Republic of Bashkortostan
16. Kirovsky City District, Volgograd, a city district of Volgograd, the administrative center of Volgograd Oblast
17. Kirovsky City District, Yaroslavl, a city district of Yaroslavl, the administrative center of Yaroslavl Oblast
18. Kirovsky City District, Yekaterinburg, a city district of Yekaterinburg, the administrative center of Sverdlovsk Oblast
Cities in Russia with a city division called "Kirovsky"

== Historical districts ==
- Kirovsky District, Murmansk Oblast (1935–1954), a district of Murmansk Okrug of Leningrad Oblast (1935–1938) and then of Murmansk Oblast (1938–1954)
- Kirovsky District, Kalinin Oblast (1929–1963), a district of Rzhev Okrug of Western Oblast (1929–1935) and then of Kalinin Oblast (1938–1963). It was abolished in 1963 and re-established in 1965 as Selizharovsky District.

== Historical city districts ==
- Kirovsky City District, Murmansk, a city district of Murmansk, Murmansk Oblast, which existed in 1939–1948 and 1951–1958

== See also ==
- Kirovsky (disambiguation)
- Kirov (disambiguation)
