= Aygevan =

Village in Armavir, Armenia

Aygevan Այգևան
- Location within Armenia
- Coordinates: 40°10′N 43°58′E
- Country: Armenia
- Marz (Province): Armavir

Population (2011)
  - Total: 1,465
- Time zone: UTC+4 ( )
  - Summer (DST)

Aygevan (Armenian: Այգևան); formerly Sovkhoz Nomer Shest – (Russian for "Sovkhoz number six"), later Imeni Stalina, later Dzerzhinski and Imeni Dzerzhinskogo, is a village in the Armavir Province of Armenia. It was founded as a state farm in 1946 and named after Felix Dzerzhinski, head of the Soviet secret police.

== See also ==
- Armavir Province
