= Ropsha =

Human settlement in Leningrad Oblast, Russia

Coordinates: 59°43′25″N 29°51′38″E

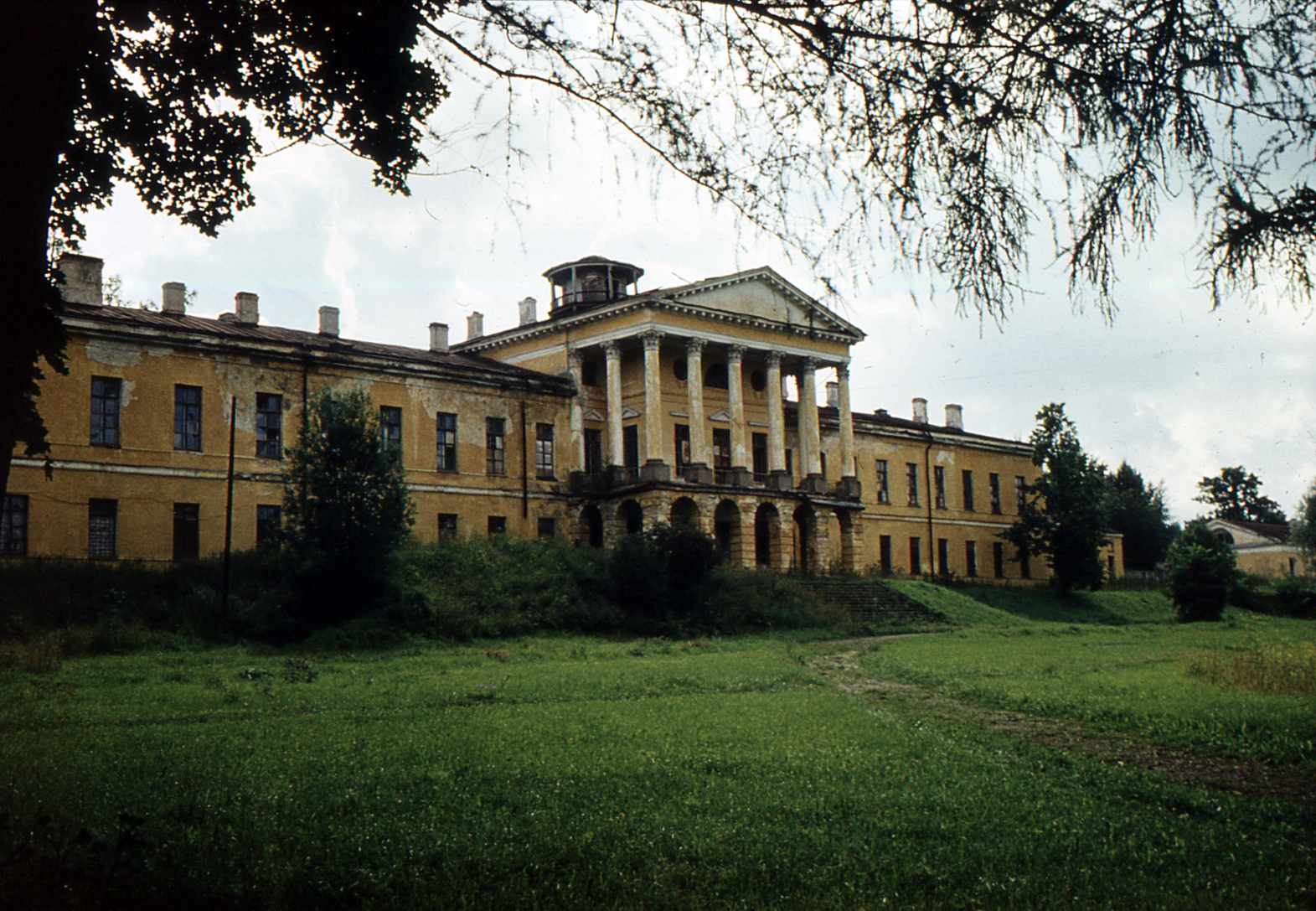
The Ropsha Palace around 1980

Ropsha (Russian: Ропша, IPA: [ˈropʂə]) is a settlement in Lomonosovsky District of Leningrad Oblast, Russia, situated about 20 kilometres (12 mi) south of Peterhof and 49 kilometres (30 mi) south-west of central Saint Petersburg, at an elevation of 80 metres (260 ft) to 130 metres (430 ft). The palace and park ensemble of Ropsha are included in the UNESCO World Heritage list as a constituent of Historic Centre of Saint Petersburg and Related Groups of Monuments.

== History ==
The settlement was first mentioned in the documents of the Novgorod Republic in the 15th century, when its name was spelled as "Khrapsha". It passed to Sweden following the Treaty of Stolbovo but was recaptured by Peter the Great during the Great Northern War. Upon hearing about the curative properties of Ropsha's mineral springs, the tsar planned to make it his summer retreat; a timber palace and small church were built there. Subsequently, when he discovered the more favourable location of Strelna and contrived a system of pipes to bring water from the Ropsha heights to the fountain cascades projected in Peterhof, he abandoned his previous plans for Ropsha and made a present of it to his senior associate, Prince Fyodor Romodanovsky, or the "Caesar-Pope" as he was wont to style him.

=== Nest of Gentry ===
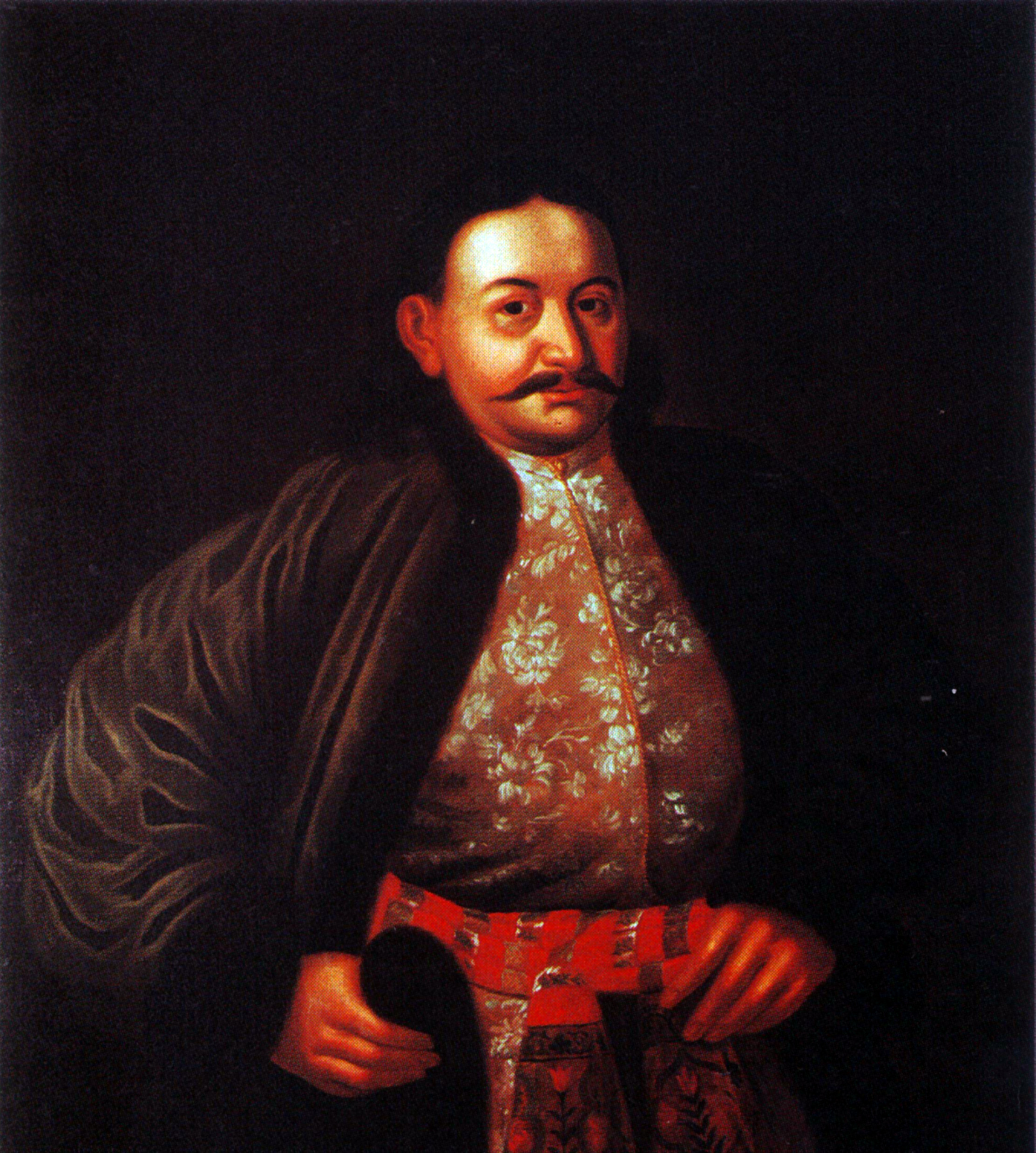
"His Caesarian Majesty" Prince Feodor Y. Romodanovsky (1640–1717)

Prince Romodanovsky was an old man of harsh disposition, who kept tame bears in his palace to scare infrequent visitors. Being in charge of Peter's secret police, he would bring political prisoners to a torture chamber arranged in Ropsha Palace and their screams would spook the neighbourhood. Despite macabre stories of his cruelty and misdeeds, a neighbour, Chancellor Golovkin, found it prudent to arrange the marriage of his son to Romodanovsky's daughter. After the 1722 wedding, Ropsha Palace was overhauled and expanded under the supervision of Golovkin's friend, Ivan Yeropkin. n In connection with the Lopukhina Conspiracy, the Golovkins fell into disgrace and their possessions were seized by Empress Elizabeth, who asked a court architect, Bartolomeo Rastrelli, to prepare plans for a new palace at Ropsha. As Rastrelli was busy with other projects, his designs for Ropsha were never executed. Towards the end of her reign, Elizabeth granted the estate to her nephew and heir, the future Peter III of Russia. It was there that he was brought under guard after the coup d'état of 1762, and it was there that Peter III was allegedly murdered under shady circumstances.

Later the same year, Catherine the Great resolved that "Ropsha is not to be mentioned again" and presented the ill-famed place to her lover, Count Grigory Orlov. The reputation of the manor was too sinister for any improvement on the grounds to be effected and Orlov soon ceded the palace to Admiral Ivan Chernyshev, who sold it for 12,000 rubles to Ivan Lazarev, a jeweller of Armenian origin. It is widely believed that Lazarev was just a cutout acting at the behest of Catherine's son Paul. The latter, unable to overtly acquire the grounds for fear of his mother's ire, was still drawn to the place where his father had been murdered.

=== Imperial estate ===
It was only after Catherine's death that Tsar Paul took over Ropsha from Lazarev. During Paul's reign, the Ropsha Palace was rebuilt in a Neoclassical style to a design by Georg von Veldten. A large paper factory was built nearby and the English gardener Thomas Gray laid out an English park with a mosaic of ponds full of fish. Paul apparently planned to rename Ropsha, in commemoration of the dramatic events of 1762, but was assassinated himself before this came to pass.

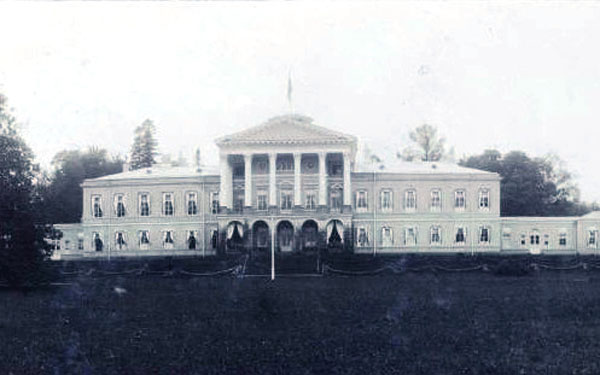
Palace of Ropsha in the early 20th century

Although the ponds of Ropsha remained an imperial fishing ground under his sons, Alexander I and Nicholas I, they rarely visited the place. It was more popular with noble anglers who even named a special breed of scaly carp after Ropsha.

Isaac Oldaker (1772 – c.1852), who was born in Marston Montgomery, Derbyshire, was 'Gardener to his Majesty the Emperor of all the Russias,' in charge of the gardens at Ropsha Palace from 1804 to 1812, when he retired on pension because of ill health, returned to England, and subsequently worked for the notable botanist Sir Joseph Banks at Spring Grove House at Isleworth in London.

When Alexandre Dumas, père visited the estate in 1858, the palace belonged to Empress Alexandra Feodorovna. In the ensuing decades, it was seldom inhabited, though Grand Duchess Xenia, sister of Nicholas II, chose to spend her wedding night there.

From the 1890s, the palace had started to deteriorate.

Nicholas II turned Ropsha Palace and parks into his favorite hunting and fishing retreat. The Tsar surrounded himself with aristocrats from all over Europe for hunting, fishing, and dining in Russian style. Ropsha also had a military garrison; a cavalry division was stationed there until 1918.

During the Russian Civil War Ropsha saw some heavy fighting, as General Yudenich wrested it from the Bolsheviks on two occasions.

=== Siege of Leningrad ===
From September 1941 to January 1944, during the siege of Leningrad, Ropsha was occupied by the troops of Nazi Germany. During World War II, from 1941 to 1944, Ropsha was mentioned in the Nazi military reports to Adolf Hitler's office as an important commanding hill with a strategic artillery post having unobstructed direct view on central Leningrad. From the artillery positions in Ropsha the Germans continued artillery bombardments of Leningrad and its southern suburbs for two years. During that time, the Germans robbed and vandalized the imperial estate; a special unit looted the palace and moved its valuable art collection to Nazi Germany. Then the palace was destroyed by the Nazis using explosive devices.

On January 19, 1944, Ropsha was retaken from the Nazi occupation as part of the Leningrad–Novgorod Offensive ending the siege. However, the palace remained in ruins and was in disrepair due to the magnitude of German damage in World War II.

Inscribed with other imperial estates into the World Heritage List, the edifice may still be viewed in its half-ruined state. Re-building the Ropsha Palace and park to its original grandeur remains a difficult task due to severe damages and losses that require a costly reconstruction, and also because of risks related to remaining land-mines and other explosives left after the Nazi siege of Leningrad.

== Today ==
As of 2012, Ropsha Estate was deserted and at the verge of collapse. In October 2016, the palace was leased to the state-owned Rosneft oil corporation for 99 years. The company promised to restore the palace and to create access for tourists to the estate after restoration.
