= Dzerzhinsk =

Dzerzhinsk, transliterated from Russian, may be the name of one of the following places.

- Dzerzhinsk, Russia
- Dzyarzhynsk, Belarus
- Dzerzhynsk, former name of Toretsk, Ukraine

== See also ==
- Dzerzhynsk (disambiguation)
- Dzerzhinsky (disambiguation)
