= Near-open front unrounded vowel =

Vowel sound represented by ⟨æ⟩ in IPA

æ
- IPA number: 325

Audio sample
- source · help

Encoding
- Entity (decimal): &#230;
- Unicode (hex): U+00E6
- X-SAMPA: {
- Braille: ⠩ (braille pattern dots-146)
Image

IPA: Vowels

	Front	Central	Back
Close	i y	ɨ ʉ	ɯ u
Near-close	ɪ ʏ		ʊ
Close-mid	e ø	ɘ ɵ	ɤ o
Mid	e̞ ø̞	ə	ɤ̞ o̞
Open-mid	ɛ œ	ɜ ɞ	ʌ ɔ
Near-open	æ	ɐ
Open	a ɶ	ä	ɑ ɒ

- IPA help
- audio
- full chart
- template

Legend: unrounded • rounded

The near-open front unrounded vowel, or near-low front unrounded vowel, is a type of vowel sound. The symbol in the International Phonetic Alphabet that represents this sound is ⟨æ⟩, a lowercase of the ⟨Æ⟩ ligature. Both the symbol and the sound are commonly referred to as "ash".

The rounded counterpart of [æ], the near-open front rounded vowel (for which the IPA provides no separate symbol) has been reported to occur allophonically in Danish; see open front rounded vowel for more information.

In practice, ⟨æ⟩ is sometimes used to represent the open front unrounded vowel; see the introduction to that page for more information.

In IPA transcriptions of Hungarian and Valencian, this vowel is typically written with ⟨ɛ⟩.

== Features ==
- Its vowel height is near-open, also known as near-low, which means the tongue is positioned similarly to an open vowel, but is slightly more constricted – that is, the tongue is positioned similarly to a low vowel, but slightly higher.
- Its vowel backness is front, which means the tongue is positioned forward in the mouth without creating a constriction that would be classified as a consonant.
- It is unrounded, which means that the lips are not rounded.

Sagittal section of a vocal tract pronouncing the IPA sound ⟨æ⟩. Note that a wavy glottis in this diagram indicates a voiced sound.

== Occurrence ==
Language		Word	IPA	Meaning	Notes
Afrikaans	Standard	perd	[pæːrt]	'horse'	Allophone of /ɛ/, in some dialects, before /k χ l r/. See Afrikaans phonology
Äiwoo		ikuwä	[ikuwæ]	'I go'	Distinguished from both [a] and [ɑ ~ ɒ].
Arabic	Standard	كتاب (kitāb)	[kiˈtæːb]	'book'	Allophone of /a/ in the environment of plain labial and coronal consonants as well as /j/ (depending on the speaker's accent). See Arabic phonology
Azerbaijani		Azərbaycan	[ɑːzæɾbɑjˈd͡ʒɑn]	'Azerbaijan'	
Bambam		bätä	[ˈbætæ]	'stem'	
Bashkir		йәй (yäy)	[jæj]	'summer'	
Bengali		ব্যাঙ/bêṅ	[bæŋ]	'frog'	Also pronounced as /ɛ/. See Bengali phonology
Bulgarian	Moesian dialects	млечен (mlechen)	[mlæt͡ʃɛn]	'made from milk'	Descendant of Proto-Slavic *ě in places where Standard Bulgarian would have /ɛ/. See Yat.
Bulgarian	Rup dialects	млечен (mlechen)	[mlæt͡ʃɛn]	'made from milk'	Descendant of Proto-Slavic *ě in all positions. See Yat.
Bulgarian	Teteven dialect	мъж (măzh)	[mæʃ]	'man'	In place of Standard Bulgarian [ɤ̞] (written as ъ).
Bulgarian	Erkech dialect	мъж (măzh)	[mæʃ]	'man'	In place of Standard Bulgarian [ɤ̞] (written as ъ).
Catalan	Many Balearic speakers	tesi	[ˈt̪ɛ̞z̺ɪ]	'thesis'	Main realization of /ɛ/. See Catalan phonology
Catalan	Valencian	tesi	[ˈt̪ɛ̞z̺ɪ]	'thesis'	Main realization of /ɛ/. Slightly more open and centralized (near-front) [æ̠] before liquids and in monosyllabics. See Catalan phonology
Catalan	Valencian	terra	[ˈt̪ær̺æ̈]	'Earth, land'	Final unstressed /a/ (usually involving vowel harmony). Can be realized as rounded and/or back. See Catalan phonology
Catalan	Valencian	raig	[ˈr̺æt͡ɕ]	'ray'	Palatal variant of /a/. It can be more open ([a]). See Catalan phonology
Catalan	Mallorcan (some speakers)	sac	[ˈs̺æc]	'bag'	Mallorcan /a/-fronting found in some speakers. It can be more open ([a]). See Catalan phonology
Chechen		аьрзу (ärzu)	[ærzu]	'eagle'	
Danish	Standard	dansk	[ˈtænˀsk]	'Danish'	Most often transcribed in IPA with ⟨a⟩ – the way it is realized by certain older or upper-class speakers. See Danish phonology
Dutch		pen	[pæn]	'pen'	Allophone of /ɛ/ before /n/ and coda /l/. In non-standard accents this allophone is generalized to other positions, where [ɛ] is used in Standard Dutch. See Dutch phonology
English	Cultivated New Zealand	cat	[kʰæt]	'cat'	Higher in other New Zealand varieties. See New Zealand English phonology
English	General American	cat	[kʰæt]	'cat'	See English phonology
English	Conservative Received Pronunciation	cat	[kʰæt]	'cat'	Fully open [a] in Standard Southern British. See English phonology
Estonian		väle	[ˈvæ̈le̞ˑ]	'agile'	Near-front. See Estonian phonology
Finnish		mäki	[ˈmæki]	'hill'	See Finnish phonology
French	Parisian	bain	[bæ̃]	'bath'	Nasalized; typically transcribed in IPA with ⟨ɛ̃⟩. See French phonology
French	Quebec	ver	[væːʁ]	'worm'	Allophone of /ɛ/ before /ʁ/ or in open syllables, and of /a/ in closed syllables. See Quebec French phonology
German	Standard Austrian	erlauben	[æˈlɑɔ̯bn̩]	'allow'	Variant of pretonic [ɛɐ̯]. See Standard German phonology
German	West Central German accents	oder	[ˈoːdæ]	'or'	Used instead of [ɐ]. See Standard German phonology
German	Northern accents	alles	[ˈæləs]	'everything'	Lower and often also more back in other accents. See Standard German phonology
German	Western Swiss accents	spät	[ʃpæːt]	'late'	Open-mid [ɛː] or close-mid [eː] in other accents; contrasts with the open-mid /ɛː/. See Standard German phonology
Greek	Macedonia	γάτα (gáta)	[ˈɣætæ]	'cat'	See Modern Greek phonology
Greek	Thessaly	γάτα (gáta)	[ˈɣætæ]	'cat'	See Modern Greek phonology
Greek	Thrace	γάτα (gáta)	[ˈɣætæ]	'cat'	See Modern Greek phonology
Greek	Pontic	καλάθια (kaláthia)	[kaˈlaθæ]	'baskets'	See Modern Greek phonology
Hindustani	Hindi	न्यूज़ीलैंड (Nyu Zilaind)	[njuːziːlænd]	'New Zealand'	An allophone of [ɛː] that appears in English loanwords. See Hindustani phonology.
Hindustani	Urdu	نیوزی لینڈ (Nyu Zilaind)	[njuːziːlænd]	'New Zealand'	An allophone of [ɛː] that appears in English loanwords. See Hindustani phonology.
Hungarian		nem	[næm]	'no'	Typically transcribed in IPA with ⟨ɛ⟩. See Hungarian phonology
Kanoê			[æː]	'tobacco'	
Kazakh		әйел (äiel)	[æ̝ˈje̘l̪ʲ]	'woman'	Varies between near-open and open-mid.
Kurdish	Sorani (Central)	گاڵته (galte)	[gäːɫtʲæ]	'joke'	Equal to Palewani (Southern) front [a]. See Kurdish phonology
Lakon		rävräv	[ræβræβ]	'evening'	
Limburgish		twelf	[ˈtβ̞æ̠ləf]	'twelve'	Front or near-front, depending on the dialect. The example word is from the Maastrichtian dialect, in which the vowel is near-front.
Lithuanian		jachtą	[ˈjæːxt̪aː]	'yacht' (accusative)	See Lithuanian phonology
Low Saxon	Including Sallandic	gläzen	[xɫæːzn̩]	'glasses'	
Luxembourgish		Käpp	[kʰæpʰ]	'heads'	See Luxembourgish phonology
Norwegian	Urban East	lær	[læːɾ]	'leather'	See Norwegian phonology
Persian		هشت (hašt)	[hæʃt]	'eight'	
Portuguese	Some dialects	pedra	[ˈpæðɾɐ]	'stone'	Stressed vowel. In other dialects closer /ɛ/. See Portuguese phonology
Portuguese	Some European speakers	também	[tɐˈmæ̃]	'also'	Stressed vowel, allophone of nasal vowel /ẽ̞/.
Romanian	Bukovinian dialect	piele	[ˈpæle]	'skin'	Corresponds to [je] in standard Romanian. Also identified in some Central Transylvanian sub-dialects. See Romanian phonology
Russian		пять (pyatʹ)	[pʲætʲ]	'five'	Allophone of /a/ between palatalized consonants. See Russian phonology
Serbo-Croatian	Zeta-Raška dialect	дан / dan	[d̪æn̪]	'day'	Regional reflex of Proto-Slavic *ь and *ъ. Sometimes nasalised.
Sinhala		ඇය (æya)	[æjə]	'she'	
Slovak		mäso	[mæso]	'meat, flesh'	In conversation sometimes pronounced as [e] or [a]. See Slovak phonology
Swedish	Central Standard	ära	[²æːɾä]	'hono(u)r'	Allophone of /ɛː, ɛ/ before /r/. See Swedish phonology
Swedish	Stockholm	läsa	[²læːsä]	'to read'	Realization of /ɛː, ɛ/ for younger speakers. Higher [ɛː, ɛ̝ ~ ɛ] for other speakers
Turkish		sen	[s̪æn̪]	'you'	Allophone of /e/ before syllable-final /m, n, l, r/. In a limited number of words (but not before /r/), it is in free variation with [e̞]. See Turkish phonology

== See also ==
- Index of phonetics articles

== Notes ==
Place →	Labial					Coronal										Dorsal					Laryngeal			
Manner ↓	Bilabial		Labiodental		Linguolabial		Dental		Alveolar		Postalveolar		Retroflex		(Alveolo-)palatal		Velar		Uvular		Pharyngeal/epiglottal		Glottal	
Nasal	m̥	m	ɱ̊	ɱ		n̼	n̪̊	n̪	n̥	n	n̠̊	n̠	ɳ̊	ɳ	ɲ̊	ɲ	ŋ̊	ŋ	ɴ̥	ɴ				
Plosive	p	b	p̪	b̪	t̼	d̼	t̪	d̪	t	d			ʈ	ɖ	c	ɟ	k	ɡ	q	ɢ	ʡ		ʔ	
Sibilant affricate							t̪s̪	d̪z̪	ts	dz	t̠ʃ	d̠ʒ	tʂ	dʐ	tɕ	dʑ								
Non-sibilant affricate	pɸ	bβ	p̪f	b̪v			t̪θ	d̪ð	tɹ̝̊	dɹ̝	t̠ɹ̠̊˔	d̠ɹ̠˔			cç	ɟʝ	kx	ɡɣ	qχ	ɢʁ	ʡʜ	ʡʢ	ʔh	
Sibilant fricative							s̪	z̪	s	z	ʃ	ʒ	ʂ	ʐ	ɕ	ʑ								
Non-sibilant fricative	ɸ	β	f	v	θ̼	ð̼	θ	ð	θ̠	ð̠	ɹ̠̊˔	ɹ̠˔	ɻ̊˔	ɻ˔	ç	ʝ	x	ɣ	χ	ʁ	ħ	ʕ	h	ɦ
Approximant		β̞		ʋ				ð̞		ɹ		ɹ̠		ɻ		j		ɰ						˷
Tap/flap		ⱱ̟		ⱱ					ɾ̥	ɾ			ɽ̊	ɽ						ɢ̆		ʡ̆		
Trill	ʙ̥	ʙ							r̥	r		r̠	ɽ̊r̥	ɽr					ʀ̥	ʀ	ʜ	ʢ		
Lateral affricate									tɬ	dɮ			tꞎ	d𝼅	c𝼆	ɟʎ̝	k𝼄	ɡʟ̝						
Lateral fricative							ɬ̪		ɬ	ɮ			ꞎ	𝼅	𝼆	ʎ̝	𝼄	ʟ̝						
Lateral approximant								l̪	l̥	l		l̠	ɭ̊	ɭ	ʎ̥	ʎ	ʟ̥	ʟ		ʟ̠				
Lateral tap/flap									ɺ̥	ɺ			𝼈̊	𝼈		ʎ̆		ʟ̆						

		BL	LD	D	A	PA	RF	P	V	U
Implosive	Voiced	ɓ			ɗ		ᶑ	ʄ	ɠ	ʛ
Implosive	Voiceless	ɓ̥			ɗ̥		ᶑ̊	ʄ̊	ɠ̊	ʛ̥
Ejective	Stop	pʼ			tʼ		ʈʼ	cʼ	kʼ	qʼ
Ejective	Affricate		p̪fʼ	t̪θʼ	tsʼ	t̠ʃʼ	tʂʼ	tɕʼ	kxʼ	qχʼ
Ejective	Fricative	ɸʼ	fʼ	θʼ	sʼ	ʃʼ	ʂʼ	ɕʼ	xʼ	χʼ
Ejective	Lateral affricate				tɬʼ			c𝼆ʼ	k𝼄ʼ	q𝼄ʼ
Ejective	Lateral fricative				ɬʼ					
Click (top: velar; bottom: uvular)	Tenuis	kʘ qʘ		kǀ qǀ	kǃ qǃ		k𝼊 q𝼊	kǂ qǂ		
Click (top: velar; bottom: uvular)	Voiced	ɡʘ ɢʘ		ɡǀ ɢǀ	ɡǃ ɢǃ		ɡ𝼊 ɢ𝼊	ɡǂ ɢǂ		
Click (top: velar; bottom: uvular)	Nasal	ŋʘ ɴʘ		ŋǀ ɴǀ	ŋǃ ɴǃ		ŋ𝼊 ɴ𝼊	ŋǂ ɴǂ	ʞ	
Click (top: velar; bottom: uvular)	Tenuis lateral				kǁ qǁ					
Click (top: velar; bottom: uvular)	Voiced lateral				ɡǁ ɢǁ					
Click (top: velar; bottom: uvular)	Nasal lateral				ŋǁ ɴǁ					
