= Kotel-Elena-Dryanovo dialect =

Dialect of Bulgarian

The Kotel-Elena-Dryanovo dialect is a Bulgarian dialect, which is part of the Balkan group of the Eastern Bulgarian dialects. Its range includes the eastern parts of the Balkan Mountains, i.e. the regions of Dryanovo, Kotel and Elena). As a result of the mass population movements that affected eastern Bulgaria during the 19th and the beginning of the 20th century, speakers of the dialect have also moved south towards Burgas and north towards Varna and Targovishte. The most significant feature of the dialect, as in all Balkan dialects, is the pronunciation of Old Church Slavonic ѣ (yat) as ʲa or ɛ, depending on the character of the following syllable. The Kotel-Elena-Dryanovo dialect can be divided into three subdialects, i.e. Kotel, Elena and Dryanovo etc. which share many common features and yet have some differences.

== Phonological and morphological characteristics ==
The Kotel-Elena-Dryanovo dialect is very similar to the Central Balkan dialect and especially to the Gabrovo subdialect. The distinguishing features of the Kotel-Elena-Dryanovo dialect are, as follows:

- Pronunciation of t and d as soft k and g - гʲаду instead of дʲaдо (grandfather), кʲах instead of тʲaх (them), кʲесто instead of тесто (dough)
- Specific articulation of the plural definite article -те: as -ти in the Kotel subdialect (уфсети), as -кʲе in the Elena subdialect (уфсекʲе) and as тʲе in the Dryanovo subdialect (уфсетʲе) vs. Standard Bulgarian офцете (the sheep)

Most other phonological and morphological characteristics of the Kotel-Elena-Dryanovo dialect are the same as the characteristics of the Central Balkan dialect and the general features typical for all Balkan dialects, cf. respective articles for details.

== Sources ==
- Стойков, Стойко: Българска диалектология, Акад. изд. "Проф. Марин Дринов", 2006
