= Subbalkan dialect =

Dialect of Bulgarian

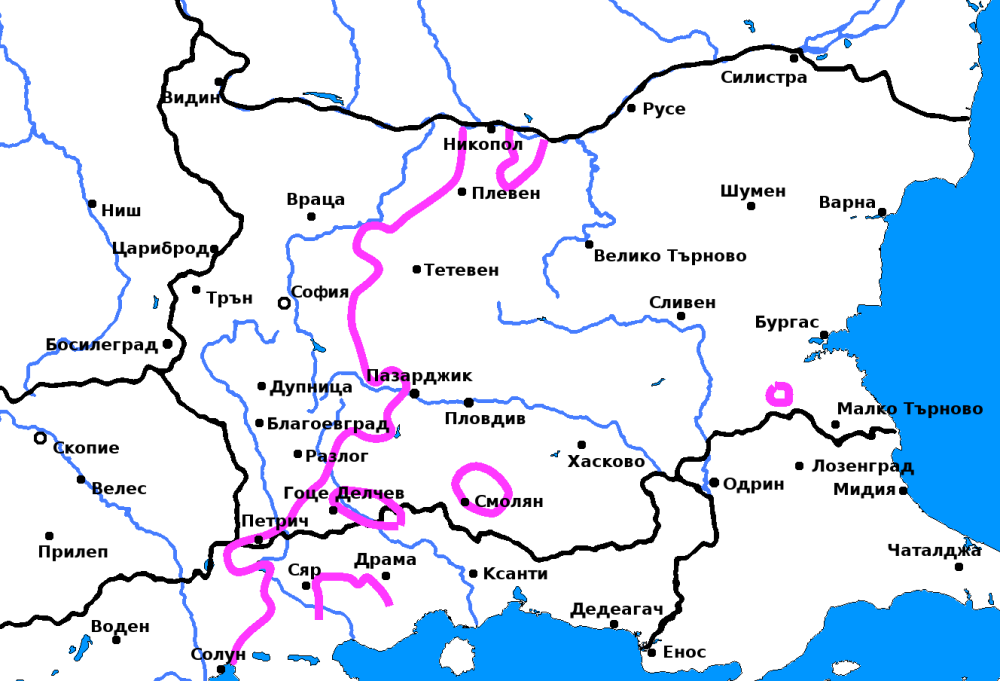
Yat border in the Bulgarian language

The Subbalkan dialect is a Bulgarian dialect, which is part of the Balkan group of the Eastern Bulgarian dialects. Its range includes the northeastern part of Bulgarian Thrace, i.e. the regions of Burgas, Sliven, Yambol, Stara Zagora and Chirpan. As a result of the mass population movements that affected eastern Bulgaria during the 19th and the beginning of the 20th century, speakers of the Subbalkan dialect have moved en masse to northeastern Bulgaria and now form a vast portion of the population of the districts of Varna, Dobrich and Balchik. Some of these also went as far as Bessarabia establishing numerous colonies there. Nowadays, a large part of the Bessarabian Bulgarians speak this dialect. The most significant feature of the Subbalkan dialect, as in all Balkan dialects, is the pronunciation of Old Church Slavonic ѣ (yat) as ʲa or ɛ, depending on the character of the following syllable.

== Phonological and morphological characteristics ==
- The ending of the verbs in 1st and 2nd conjugation and female nouns is -a instead of -ъ as in the Central Balkan dialect: че'та, же'на (I read, woman). This separates the Subbalkan dialect from most other Balkan dialects and brings it closer to the Pirdop dialect and all Western Bulgarian dialects
- Ending ʲa for Old Church Slavonic ѣ (yat) in the end of the word instead of formal Bulgarian ɛ: зл҄а instead of formal Bulgarian зле (badly), добр҄а instead of formal Bulgarian добре (well)
- reduction of i into ʲə in an unstressed syllable before hard syllables or a consonant in the suffixes -ин, -ина, -ино and -ик: българ҄ън instead of formal Bulgarian българин (a Bulgarian), ист҄ъна instead of formal Bulgarian истина (truth)
- Transition of the consonant group -дн into -нн: гланна vs. formal Bulgarian гладна (hungry)
- Stress on the final syllable in past aorist tense of certain verbs: гли'дах (I watched)
- The masculine definite article is (ə) (in a stressed syllable) and slightly reduced a (in an unstressed syllable) - гърˈбъ, ˈстола (the back, the chair)
- The plural definite article is -ти instead of formal Bulgarian -те: мъжети instead of formal Bulgarian мъжете (the men)
- Lack of the oblique case in proper nouns: дадух на Иван (I gave to Ivan), cf. Central Balkan dialect

As a result of its specific characteristics, the Subbalkan dialect is usually considered to be a transitional dialect between the Balkan dialects and the Rup dialects. Most other phonological and morphological characteristics of the Subbalkan dialect are the same as the general features typical for all Balkan dialects, cf. article.

== Sources ==
Стойков, Стойко: Българска диалектология, Акад. изд. "Проф. Марин Дринов", 2006
