= Branko Manoilovski =

- Born: 2 August 1941 (age 85); Kičinica, Upper Reka
- Education: University of Zagreb
- Occupations: Politician, Agricultural engineer

Branko Manoilovski (Albanian: Branko Manojli, Branko Manoillovski; Macedonian: Бранко Маноиловски) (born on 2 August 1941, in Kičinica, Upper Reka) is a Macedonian politician of Albanian Orthodox descent. In the 2016 parliamentary elections he was a candidate for the Democratic Union for Integration and was elected in Macedonian parliament. He migrated to USA early but returned to Macedonia to promote the Albanian identity among the assimilated Albanian Orthodox population.

== Personal life ==
Branko was born to Zafirka and Manojlo Manoilovski. He finished his elementary education in Beličica, his middle school education in Gostivar and his high school education in Tetovo. In 1967 he went to university in Zagreb for Agricultural Engineering. In 1969 he migrated to USA (where his family still lives) but after entering retirement he would visit Macedonia often and eventually decided to return.

== Support for LGBT rights ==
He has declared that he supports LGBT rights, but after a backlash from his own political party he stressed out that those were only his personal views.
