= Teteven dialect =

Dialect of Bulgarian

The Teteven dialect is a Bulgarian dialect, which is part of the Balkan group of the Eastern Bulgarian dialects. It is spoken in the town of Teteven and several neighbouring villages and is almost completely surrounded by the Central Balkan dialect, except on the west where it borders on the Western Bulgarian Botevgrad dialect. The most significant feature of the dialect, as in all Balkan dialects, is the pronunciation of Old Church Slavonic ѣ (yat) as ʲa or ɛ, depending on the character of the following syllable.

== Phonological and morphological characteristics ==
- The articulation of yat generally follows the Central Balkan dialect. However, the Teteven dialect features a much greater number of cases of articulation of ʲa than either the Balkan dialects or Standard Bulgarian, e.g. before ж /ʒ/, ш /ʃ/, ч /tʃ/, in one-syllable words and in certain verbs. This brings the Teteven dialect closer to certain Rup dialects: черʲaша vs. formal Bulgarian череша (cherry), мʲaт vs. formal Bulgarian мет (honey; Proto-Slavic медъ, without yat)

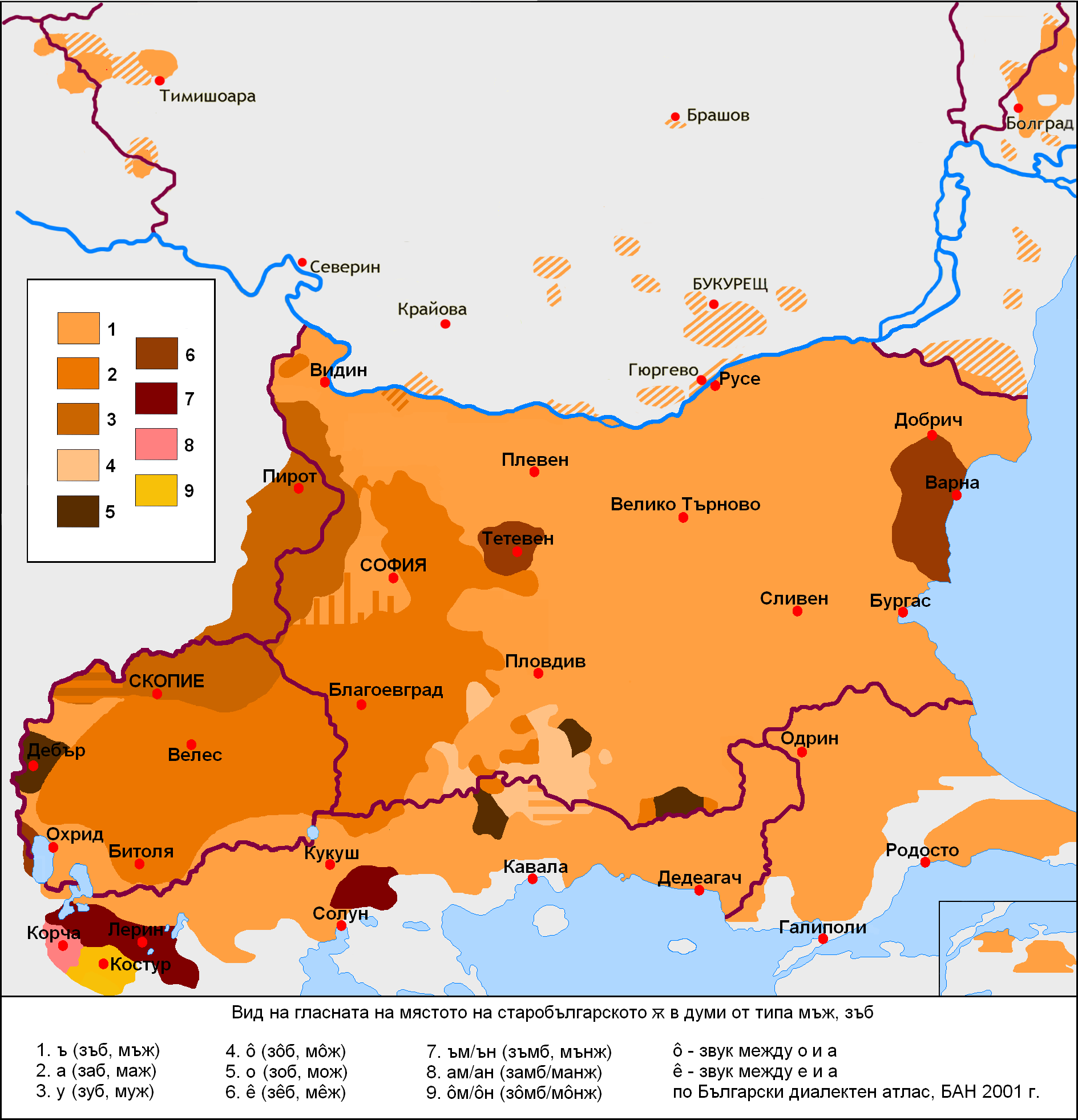
Map of the Big Yus isogloss in Bulgarian language in early 20th century

- Articulation of Old Church Slavonic ѫ (yus) and ъ as broad е (æ) in a stressed syllable and as a slightly reduced a in an unstressed syllable, as in the Erkech dialect: зæп vs. formal зъп, даждæ vs. formal дъждът
- ɛ for Old Church Slavonic little yus (ѧ) with palatalisation of the preceding consonant: кл҄етва vs. formal Bulgarian клетва (oath)
- Transition of a into e only after a soft (palatal) consonant and ч /tʃ/ but not before ж /ʒ/ and ш /ʃ/ (cf. Balkan dialects)
- Vocalic r and l for Old Church Slavonic ръ/рь and лъ/ль as in the Northwestern Bulgarian dialects instead of the combinations ръ/ър (rə~ər) and лъ/ъл (lə~əl) in Standard Bulgarian - дрво, слза instead of дърво, сълза (tree, tear)
- The masculine definite article is broad е (æ) in a stressed syllable and as a slightly reduced a in an unstressed syllable: даж'дæ vs. formal Bulgarian дъж'дът
- Ending e instead of formal Bulgarian i for plural past active aorist participles (биле instead of били), as in the Northwestern Bulgarian dialects
- Ending e instead of formal Bulgarian i for multi-syllable masculine nouns (българе instead of българи)

Most of the other phonological and morphological characteristics of the Erkech dialect are similar to the general features typical for all Balkan dialects, cf. article for details.

== Sources ==
Стойков, Стойко: Българска диалектология, Акад. изд. "Проф. Марин Дринов", 2006
