= Panagyurishte dialect =

Dialect of Bulgarian

The Panagyurishte dialect is a Bulgarian dialect, which is part of the Balkan group of the Eastern Bulgarian dialects. Its range includes the town of Panagyurishte, as well as a number of neighbouring villages. The most significant feature of the dialect, as in all Balkan dialects, is the pronunciation of Old Church Slavonic ѣ (yat) as ʲa or ɛ, depending on the character of the following syllable.

== Phonological and morphological characteristics ==
- Transition of ʲu into i: клич vs. formal Bulgarian клʲyч
- Pronunciation of Old Church Slavonic groups ръ/рь and лъ/ль only as ър (ər) and ъл (əl) instead of formal Bulgarian ръ/ър (rə~ər) and лъ/ъл (lə~əl) - сълнце vs. formal Bulgarian слънце (sun), кърчма vs. formal Bulgarian кръчма (pub)
- Hard consonant endings, especially in verbs: молъ instead of formal Bulgarian мол҄ъ (I ask)

Most of the other phonological and morphological characteristics of the Panagyurishte dialect are similar to the general features typical for all Balkan dialects, cf. article.

== Sources ==
Стойков, Стойко: Българска диалектология, Акад. изд. "Проф. Марин Дринов", 2006
