= Kičinica =

Kičinica Кичиница Kiçnicë
- Village
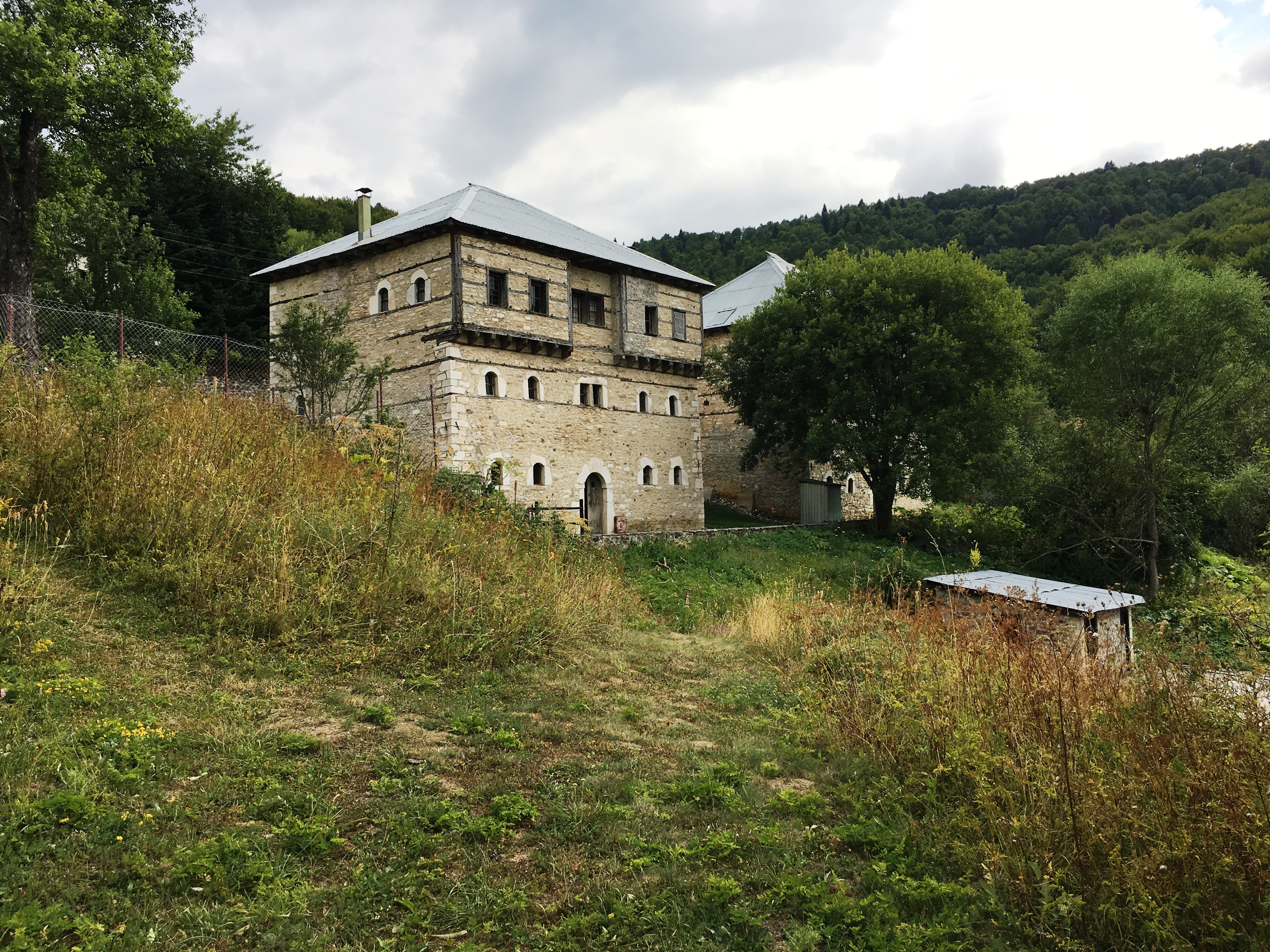
- Traditional houses in the village

- Location within North Macedonia
- Coordinates: 41°42′N 20°43′E
- Country: North Macedonia
- Region: Polog
- Municipality: Mavrovo and Rostuša

Population (2021)
  - Total: 0
- Time zone: UTC+1 (CET)
  - Summer (DST): UTC+2 (CEST)
- Car plates: GV
- Website: .

Kičinica (Macedonian: Кичиница, Albanian: Kiçnicë) is a remote village in the municipality of Mavrovo and Rostuša, North Macedonia.

== History ==
In the 1467/68 Ottoman defter Kičinica appeared as uninhabited, while in 1519 there lived 8 Christian families in the village. In the census of 1583 the village of Kishnica was a derven and maintained the Kallkandelen-Dibar road, had 12 households and paid the Sipahi 360 akçe income per year. The anthroponyms recorded were Albanian, mixed Slavic-Albanian as well as Muslim in character: (e.g Mehmet Pervane, Dervish Pervane, Petri Gjin, Gjin Gjorçe, Stojan Çernak, Pejo Pali).

According to Ethnographie des Vilayets D'Andrinople, de Monastir, et de Salonique, published in Constantinople in 1878, the village had a total of 30 households with 86 Orthodox Albanian inhabitants.

In the late 1890s Štilijan Čaparoski folklorist Panajot Ginoski, from Galičnik, Dolna Reka, maintained that Upper Reka inhabitants spoke a corrupted form of Albanian that was understood only by the locals, and contained a mixture of Slavic and Albanians words. Ginoski also maintained that the inhabitants of Kičinica could speak both Mijak and Albanian.

In statistics gathered by Vasil Kanchov in 1900, the village of Kičinica was inhabited by 120 Christian Albanians, of whom could speak Bulgarian while Albanian was the language of the household. The village does not appear in the demographic data of D.M. Brancoff (1905), indicating a lack of a Christian population.

According to statistics from the newspaper Debarski Glas in 1911 in Kičinica there were 18 Albanian patriarchist houses. According to the researcher Stefan Mladenov, in 1916 in the district of Galičnik it was difficult to accurately count the Albanians, especially in Upper Reka, because there were Christian villages that could speak both Albanian and Bulgarian, such as: Beličica, Duf, Sence and Kičinica. Mladenov noted that the Muslim Albanians in this area still kept their Christian traditions and lived as brothers with the Christian Albanians of Upper Reka.

The village is mentioned in 1927 in the Serbian newspaper "Vreme". In a report titled "Through Southern Serbia : Under Šar and under Korab", the journalist writing about the village considers it as being populated by "Serbs who only speak Albanian".

"We are in the district of Galičnik, in the pure Serbian villages: Duf, Gorno Jelovce, Vrben, Kičinica, Beličica, Brodec, where even under Turkey they kept their Serbian names and Orthodoxy, but the residents there do not know a single word of Serbian. They all speak only Albanian and call themselves Serbs. Their names and surnames are pure Serbian, their dress is like that from our Mavrovo, they celebrate the holidays, but they do not know any language other than Albanian. Now that the schools are open, the children can for the first time learn Serbian and teach in their mother tongue even their parents, who have forgotten it over the centuries"."

However, Salihi notes that this identification is due to the fact that the local Albanians adhered to the Orthodox Christian church. As opposed to reflecting ethno-linguistic identity.

== Demographics ==
In the censuses after the Second World War, starting from the 1953 census, its Macedonianization begins; thus, out of a total of 89 inhabitants, 88 declared as Macedonian and 1 as Albanian; in the 1961 census it counted 48 inhabitants, all of them declared Macedonians, and in the 1971 census no inhabitants were registered as the population had emigrated from this settlement.

Ethnic group	census 1953		census 1961	
Ethnic group	Number	%	Number	%
Macedonians	88	98.9	48	100.0
Albanians	1	1.1	0	0.0
Total	89		48	

== Culture ==
The village was noted for its celebration of Shynzhérzhi i dimnit, held on 9 February. Traditional sarma without meat was an important component of the event. Author and Kičinica native Branko Manoilovski described that during his life there, although Church service was held in Old Church Slavonic, the day to day communication with him, his family and the rest of the village took place in Albanian. He also described traditional Albanian concepts, such as the besa and as well as wedding rites being sung in Albanian songs.

== Notable people ==
- Branko Manoilovski, politician
