= Erkech dialect =

Dialect of Bulgarian

The Erkech dialect is a Bulgarian dialect, which is part of the Balkan group of the Eastern Bulgarian dialects. It originates from two villages in the eastern parts of the Balkan Mountains, Kozichino (formerly Erkech) near Pomorie and Golitsa south of Varna. As a result of the mass population movements that affected eastern Bulgaria during the 19th and the beginning of the 20th century, speakers of the dialect have established numerous colonies in the regions of Provadia, Varna, Novi Pazar, Balchik, Silistra and Pomorie, thus significantly expanding the range of the dialect. The most significant feature of the dialect, as in all Balkan dialects, is the pronunciation of Old Church Slavonic ѣ (yat) as ʲa or ɛ, depending on the character of the following syllable.

== Phonological and morphological characteristics ==
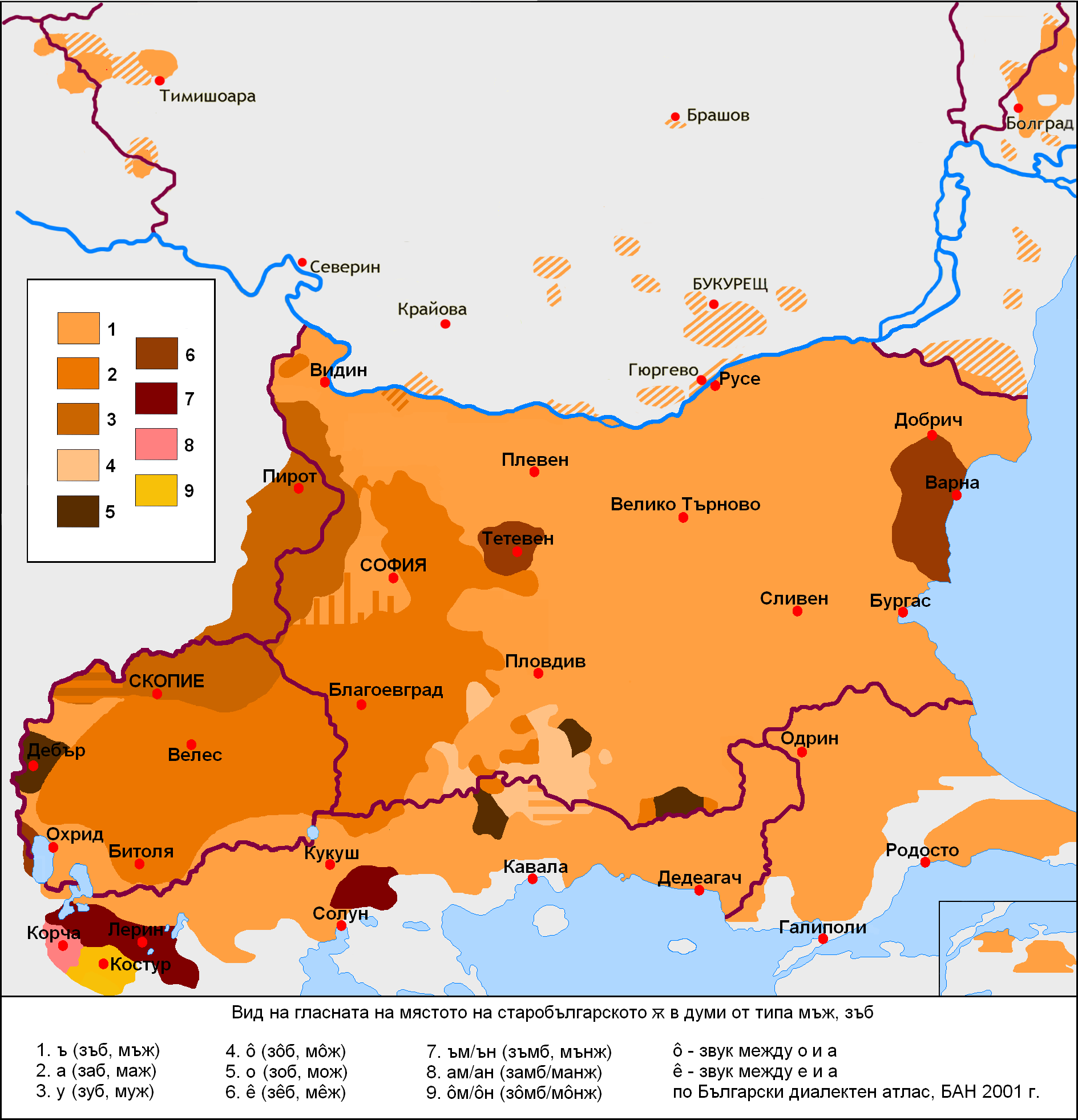
Map of the Big Yus isogloss in Bulgarian language in early 20th century

Due to the relative isolation of the two villages in the past, the Erkech dialect has a number of idiosyncratic features that separate it from the other Balkan dialects:

- long vowels under stress, i.e. stressed i is pronounced as iː (дубиитък vs. formal добитък) and stressed o is pronounced as ɔː (коон vs. formal кон)
- Pronunciation of Old Church Slavonic ѫ (yus) and ъ as long broad е (æ) in a stressed syllable and as a slightly reduced a in an unstressed syllable - зæːп vs. formal зъп, даждæː vs. formal дъждът. The Teteven dialect has a similar feature, although without long vowels
- Lack of consonant f which is replaced in all positions by x - кухар vs. formal куфар (suitcase), хурна vs. formal фурна (oven)

Most of the other phonological and morphological characteristics of the Erkech dialect are similar to the general features typical for all Balkan dialects, cf. article for details.

== Sources ==
Стойков, Стойко: Българска диалектология, Акад. изд. "Проф. Марин Дринов", 2006
