= Kiril Mirchev =

Bulgarian linguist

Kiril Spiridonov Mirchev (Bulgarian: Кирил Спиридонов Мирчев; 3 November 1902 - 21 December 1975) was a Bulgarian linguist, and one of the biggest specialists in Old Bulgarian (Old Church Slavonic), History of the Bulgarian language and Bulgarian dialectology in the country.

== Biography ==
Mirchev was born in a large Bulgarian family in the then Ottoman town of Bitola, today in North Macedonia. At the age of 11, he and his entire family were forced to move to Sofia by the Serbian Occupation Force following Bulgaria's defeat in the Second Balkan War. In 1927, Mirchev was awarded a master's degree in Slavic Philology by the University of Sofia. He also specialised at the Jagiellonian University in Poland.

He chaired the Department of Bulgarian History and the Department of Bulgarian Dialectology at the Bulgarian Language Institute of the Bulgarian Academy of Sciences from 1951 and 1970, respectively, until he died in 1975.

Mirchev's magnum opus was his Historical Grammar of the Bulgarian Language („Историческа граматика на българския език“) published in 1958 and republished in 1963 and 1978.

The other major area of interest in his work was Bulgarian dialectology, with a special focus on the Bulgarian dialects in Macedonia.

== Selected works ==
- The Nevrokop Dialect („Неврокопският говор“), Sofia, 1936
- Serbian Science on the language of the Macedonian Bulgarians („Сръбската наука за езика на македонските българи“), Sofia, 1943
- The Enina Apostle. An Old Bulgarian Relic from the 1000s („Енински апостол. Старобългарски паметник от ХІ век“), Sofia, 1965
- The Unity of Bulgarian Dialects in the Present and the Past („Единството на българските диалекти в миналото и днес“), Sofia, 1972

== See also ==
- Stefan Mladenov
