= Beličica =

Beličica Беличица Beliçicë
- Village
- Location within North Macedonia
- Coordinates: 41°42′N 20°41′E
- Country: North Macedonia
- Region: Polog
- Municipality: Mavrovo and Rostuša

Population (2002)
  - Total: 4
- Time zone: UTC+1 (CET)
  - Summer (DST): UTC+2 (CEST)
- Car plates: GV
- Website: .

Beličica (Macedonian: Беличица, Albanian: Beliçicë) is a village in the municipality of Mavrovo and Rostuša, North Macedonia.

== History ==
In the 1467/68 Ottoman defter Beličica appeared as uninhabited, in 1519 there lived 18 Christian families in the village and in 1583 there lived 30 Christian families in the village. In 1583 the village paid the Sipahi 2,000 akçe per year and 4 mills worked through ought the year. The names recorded were Albanian and mixed Albanian-Slavic in character (e.g Boshko Gjon, Stojko Leka, Bogdan Pejo, Petko Gjon, Gjin Gjon, Vele Gjin, Gjin Pero, Stojko Gjin, Bran Nikolla, Petro Gjin, Pero Leka, Leka Pero, Nikolla Stojko, Leka Jane etc).

According to Ethnographie des Vilayets D'Andrinople, de Monastir, et de Salonique, published in Constantinople in 1878 and reflecting the male population statistics of 1873, Bélitchitza is listed as a village with 100 households, and its inhabitants consist of 334 Orthodox Albanians.

In the late 1890s Štilijan Čaparoski folklorist Panajot Ginoski, from Galičnik, Dolna Reka, maintained that Upper Reka inhabitants spoke a corrupted form of Albanian that was understood only by the locals, and contained a mixture of Slavic and Albanians words. Ginoski also maintained that the inhabitants of Beličica could speak both Mijak and Albanian.

In statistics gathered by Vasil Kanchov in 1900, the village of Beličica was inhabited by 450 Christian Albanians, who could speak Bulgarian while Albanian was the language of the household. In 1905 in statistics gathered by Dimitar Mishev Brancoff, Beličica was inhabited by 438 Albanians and had a Bulgarian school.

According to statistics from the newspaper Debarski Glas in 1911 there were 36 Albanian exarchist houses and 30 Albanian patriarchist houses in Beličica. There is a Serbian school in the village with 1 teacher and 15 students. According to the researcher Stefan Mladenov, in 1916 in the district of Galičnik it was difficult to accurately count the Albanians, especially in Upper Reka, because there were Christian villages that could speak both Albanian and Bulgarian, such as: Beličica, Duf, Sence and Kičinica. Mladenov noted that the Muslim Albanians in this area still kept their Christian traditions and lived as brothers with the Christian Albanians of Upper Reka.

The village is mentioned in 1927 in the Serbian newspaper "Vreme". In a report titled "Through Southern Serbia : Under Šar and under Korab", the journalist writing about the village considers it as being populated by "Serbs who only speak Albanian".

"We are in the district of Galičnik, in the pure Serbian villages: Duf, Gorno Jelovce, Vrben, Kičinica, Beličica, Brodec, where even under Turkey they kept their Serbian names and Orthodoxy, but the residents there do not know a single word of Serbian. They all speak only Albanian and call themselves Serbs. Their names and surnames are pure Serbian, their dress is like that from our Mavrovo, they celebrate the holidays, but they do not know any language other than Albanian. Now that the schools are open, the children can for the first time learn Serbian and teach in their mother tongue even their parents, who have forgotten it over the centuries"."

However, Salihi notes that this identification is due to the fact that the local Albanians adhered to the Orthodox Christian church. As opposed to reflecting ethno-linguistic identity.

According to a 1929 ethnographic map by Russian Slavist Afanasy Selishchev, Beličica was an Albanian village.

According to the 1942 Albanian census, Kičinica was inhabited by 256 Orthodox Albanians, all of whom could speak Serbian.

Communist partisan resistance emerged from villages like Beličica that fought against Balli Kombëtar forces. On 19 September 1944, after 19 Partisans were captured, they along with 17 Beličica villagers were massacred by Ballist forces headed by Aqif Reçani near the area of the former village of Trnica.

== Demographics ==
According to the 2002 census, the village had a total of 4 Macedonians.
