= Shumen dialect =

Dialect of Bulgarian

The Shumen dialect is a Bulgarian dialect, member of the Moesian dialects. It is one of the best preserved Moesian dialects and is spoken in the regions of Shumen and Kaspichan.

== Phonological and morphological characteristics ==
- The reflex of Old Church Slavonic ѣ in a stressed syllable is я (ʲa) before a hard syllable (бѣлъ > /bʲaɫ/) and broad е (æ) before a soft syllable (бѣли > /bæli/). In an unstressed syllable, the reflex is, however, only я (ʲa).
- Complete loss of x /x/ in all positions. It is replaced by either f or v: фулера vs. formal Bulgarian холера (cholera)
- The masculine definite article is о (stressed) and у (unstressed) instead of formal Bulgarian –ът/ъ (гърбо̀, сто̀лу instead of гърбъ̀т, сто̀лът)
- Preserved traces of Old Bulgarian ы (ɨ): сын vs. formal Bulgarian син (son). This makes the Shumen dialect extremely archaic as (ɨ) is considered to be the original pronunciation of Old Church Slavonic ы
- Transition of a into e after a soft (palatal) consonant and before a soft syllable: шапка-шепки vs. Standard Bulgarian шапка-шапки (hat-hats)
- Large number of o reflexes of Old Church Slavonic ъ in a suffix position (as in the Southwestern Bulgarian dialects) and subsequent reduction of o into у: напредук vs. Standard Bulgarian напредък (progress)
- Labialisation of и into ʲу: пипер is /pʲupɛr/ (as if пюпер) vs. Standard Bulgarian /pipɛr/ (pepper)
- Elision of syllables, vowels and consonants, usually in frequently used words: рапта vs. Standard Bulgarian работа (work)
- A large number of lexical peculiarities, e.g. жерка vs. common Bulgarian воденица (watermill)
- The modern Bulgarian vowel ъ (from both yers and *ǫ) is pronounced as a close /ɯ/, rather than close-mid /ɤ/

For other phonological and morphological characteristics that are typical for all Moesian dialects, cf. article.

== Sources ==
Стойков, Стойко: Българска диалектология, Акад. изд. "Проф. Марин Дринов", 2006, с. 105-106
