= Balkan dialects of Bulgarian =

Group of dialects of Bulgarian

Balkan
- Native to: Bulgaria
- Ethnicity: Bulgarians
- Language family: Indo-European: Balto-Slavic; Slavic; South Slavic; Bulgarian; Balkan
- Dialects: Central Balkan; Erkech; Kotel-Elena-Dryanovo; Panagyurishte; Pirdop; Subbalkan; Teteven

Language codes
- ISO 639-3: None (mis)
- Glottolog: balk1260
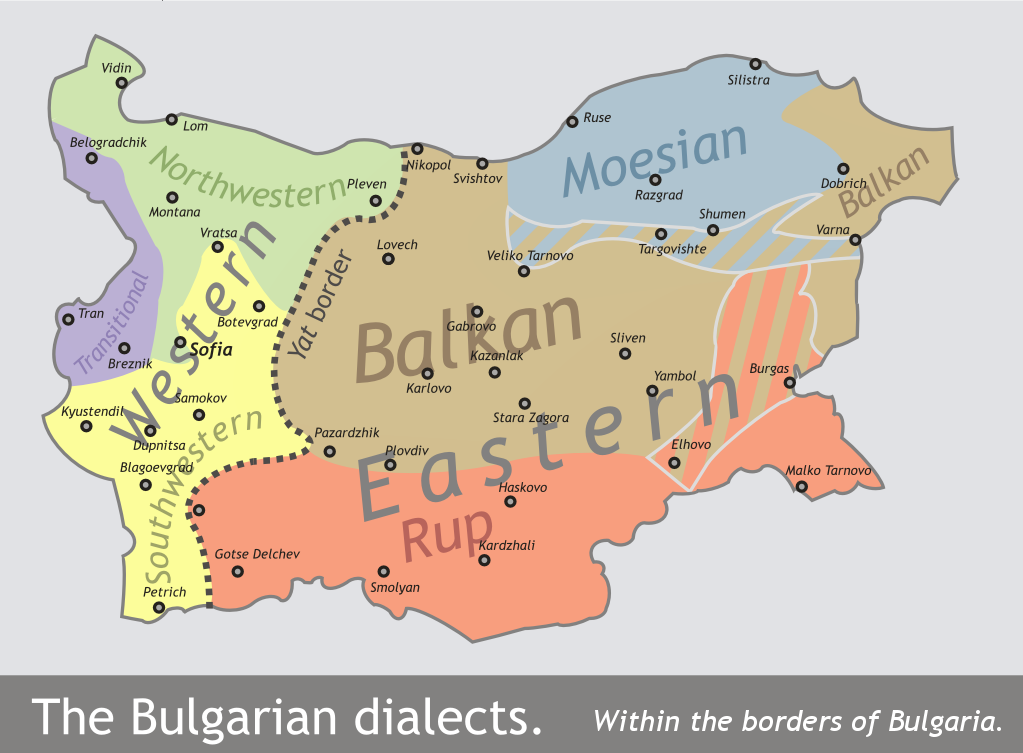
- Map of the Bulgarian dialects within Bulgaria, including Balkan. Balkan

The Balkan dialects are the most extensive group of dialects of the Bulgarian language, covering almost half of the present-day territory of Bulgaria. Their range includes north-central Bulgaria and most of the Bulgarian part of Thrace, excluding the Rhodopes, the region of Haskovo and Strandzha. As a result of the mass population movements that affected eastern Bulgaria during the 19th and the beginning of the 20th century, the Balkan dialects are now spoken also in vast areas of northeastern Bulgaria, especially the regions of Dobrich and Varna. The most significant feature of the dialects, as in most Eastern Bulgarian dialects, is the pronunciation of Old Church Slavonic ѣ (yat) as ʲa or ɛ, depending on the character of the following syllable. The Balkan dialects, and in particular, the Central Balkan dialect, lie at the foundation of formal Bulgarian. However, they are not identical to the standard language because many of its features derive from the Western Bulgarian dialects, including the Macedonian dialects, or are a compromise between Eastern and Western standard.

== Phonological and morphological characteristics ==
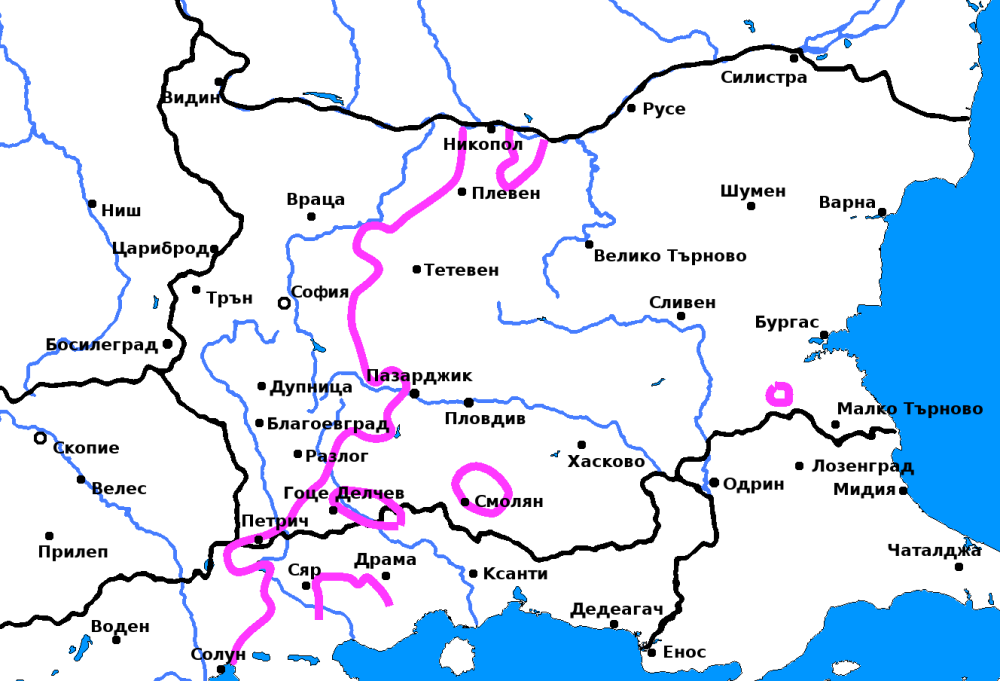
Yat border in the Bulgarian language

- Pronunciation of Old Church Slavonic ѣ (yat) as я/е (ʲa/ɛ) – бял/бели (as in Standard Bulgarian)
- щ/жд (ʃt/ʒd) for Proto-Slavic *tʲ/*dʲ (as in Standard Bulgarian) - нощ, между (night, between)
- ъ (ə) for Old Church Slavonic ѫ (yus) and ъ (ə) (as in Standard Bulgarian) - мъж, сън (man, sleep)
- Strong reduction of unstressed broad vowels /a/, /ɛ/ and /ɔ/, which are usually transformed into /ə/, /i/ and /u/. In contrast, Standard Bulgarian allows only moderate reduction of /a/ and /ɔ/ and does not allow any reduction of /ɛ/, i.e. the formal norm is a compromise between Eastern and Western Bulgarian (Macedonian)
- Full mutation of a into e after a soft (palatal) consonant and ж /ʒ/, ш /ʃ/, ч /t͡ʃ/ and дж /d͡ʒ/, before a soft syllable: жаба-жеби (frog-frogs), чаша-чеши (cup-cups), пиян-пиени (drunk sing. - drunk pl.). This is not accepted in Standard Bulgarian, which has instead adopted Western Bulgarian жаба-жаби, чаша-чаши, пиян-пияни

For the phonological and morphological characteristics of the individual dialects included in the Balkan dialects, cf. individual articles.

== Sources ==
Стойков, Стойко: Българска диалектология, Акад. изд. "Проф. Марин Дринов", 2006
