= Central Balkan dialect =

Dialect of Bulgarian

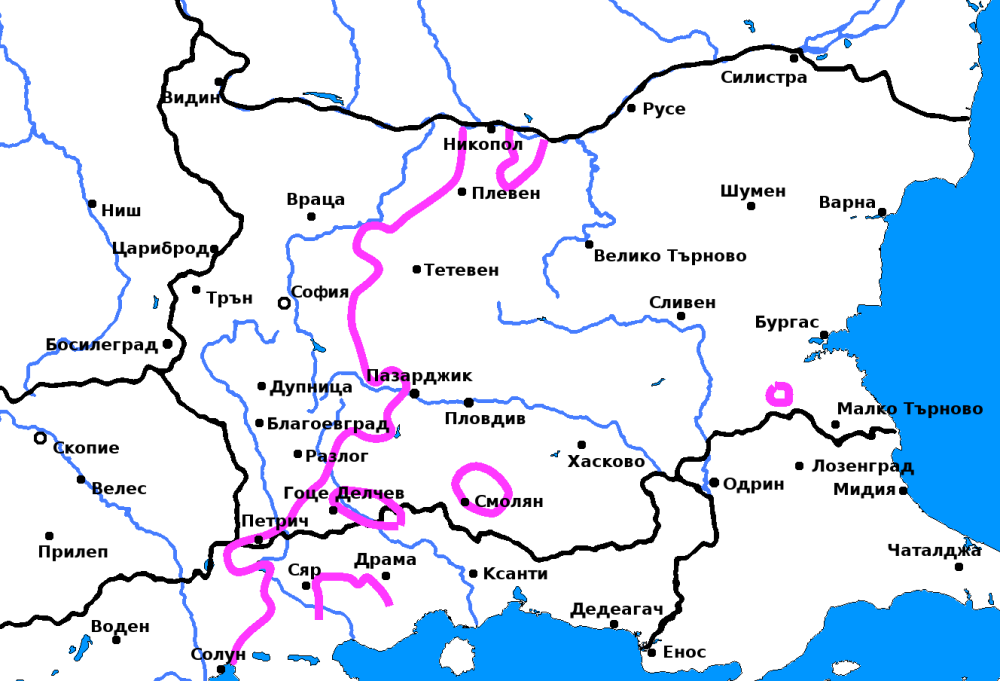
Yat border in the Bulgarian language

The Central Balkan dialect is a Bulgarian dialect that is part of the Balkan group of the Eastern Bulgarian dialects. Its range includes most of north-central Bulgaria (without the regions of Dryanovo and Elena), as well as the regions of Karlovo, Kazanlak and Plovdiv in southern Bulgaria, all the way down to the northernmost ridges of the Rhodopes. As a result of the mass population movements that affected eastern Bulgaria during the 19th and the beginning of the 20th century, the Central Balkan dialect is now spoken also in vast areas of northeastern Bulgaria. The most significant feature of the dialect is the pronunciation of Old Church Slavonic ѣ (yat) as ʲa or ɛ, depending on the character of the following syllable. The Central Balkan dialect lies at the foundation of formal Bulgarian. However, it is not identical to the standard language because many of its features derive from the Western Bulgarian dialects, including the Macedonian dialects, or are a compromise between Eastern and Western standard. The Central Balkan dialect includes a number of subdialects, e.g. Troyan, Lovech, Gabrovo, Karlovo, Kalofer, Tryavna, etc. which share many common features and yet have some differences.

== Phonological and morphological characteristics ==
- Alternation of ръ and ър (rə~ər) and лъ and ъл (lə~əl) for Old Church Slavonic ръ, рь and лъ, ль depending on the number of syllables of the word - кълва vs. клъвна (as in Standard Bulgarian)
- Consonants in endings for 1st person sing. present time are soft in the Gabrovo, Tryavna and Troyan subdialects - мол҄ъ (I ask) and hard in the Lovech, Karlovo and Kalofer subdialects - молъ
- The masculine definite article is always ът (кракът - the leg) except the Tryavna subdialect where it is ъ (кракъ)
- There are two forms for family and personal masculine names: one for nominative case (without an ending) and another one for oblique case (with an ending -a) - дай на брата си (give to your brother). The oblique form does not exist in Standard Bulgarian.

Most other phonological and morphological characteristics of the Central Balkan dialect are the same as the general features typical for all Balkan dialects, cf. article.

== Sources ==
Стойков, Стойко: Българска диалектология, Акад. изд. "Проф. Марин Дринов", 2006
