= Stefan Mladenov =

Bulgarian linguist (1880–1963)

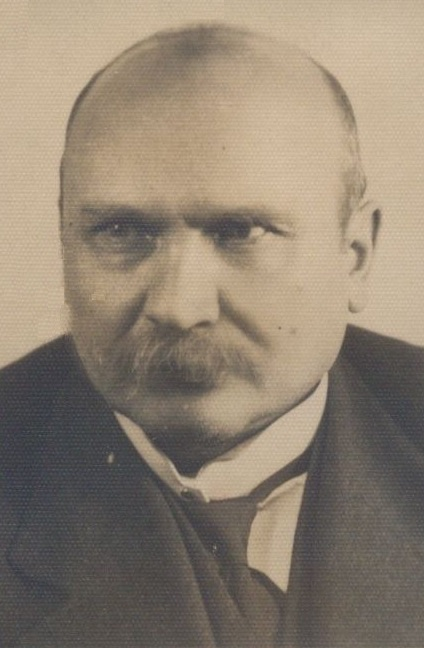
- Born: Stefan Mladenov Stoyanov; 27 December [O.S. 15 December] 1880; Vidin, Bulgaria
- Died: 1 May 1963 (aged 82); Sofia, Bulgaria
- Resting place: Central Sofia Cemetery; 42°42′50.0″N 23°20′00.5″E
- Other name: Стефан Младенов Стоянов
- Occupation: linguist
- Known for: Bulgarian studies
- Notable work: Introduction to General Linguistics

Stefan Mladenov (27 December [O.S. 15 December] 1880 – 1 May 1963) was a Bulgarian linguist and dialectologist, a specialist in Indo-European linguistics, Slavic studies, Balkan studies, Bulgarian studies and a scientist of world renown and authority.

== Career ==
He was the first translator of Henrik Ibsen into Bulgarian. Corresponding Member of a number of Academies of Sciences, including the Russian Academy of Sciences (the only Bulgarian scientist during the Soviet period until the end of World War II); The German Academy of Sciences; Polish Academy of Sciences and more, including King's College London.

He led the Bulgarian delegation to the First Linguistic Congress in Prague in 1935. In 1929, his "History of the Bulgarian language" was published in German under the review of Max Vasmer. Previously edited the special part in the second and third volume of the first three-volume story in Bulgarian by Benyo Tsonev. His writings are fundamental to historical comparativism, because Old Bulgarian is the fourth classical and medieval literary language (see trilingual heresy).

Stefan Mladenov made a special contribution to clarifying the historical influence of the Bulgarian language and to the emergence of languages from the Balkan Linguistic Union. According to Mladenov, the South Slavic speeches within this union are Bulgarian.

== Publications ==
Stefan Mladenov has over 1100 scientific publications. More than 140 reviews and reviews from around the world have been published for his work. In the 20th century and in the run up to the discovery of the Internet, it was one of the largest facilities in comparative linguistics and historical linguistics in the world.
